= Grandview Heights, Champaign County, Ohio =

Community in Champaign County, Ohio, US

Grandview Heights, Ohio
- Unincorporated community
- Location within Ohio
- Coordinates: 40°11′08″N 83°58′13″W
- Country: United States
- State: Ohio
- Counties: Champaign
- Elevation: 1,099 ft (335 m)
- Time zone: UTC-5 (Eastern (EST))
  - Summer (DST): UTC-4 (EDT)
- ZIP code: 43072
- Area codes: 937, 326
- GNIS feature ID: 1048800

Grandview Heights is an unincorporated community in Johnson Township, Champaign County, Ohio, United States. It is located between St. Paris and Carysville along Ohio State Route 235 on the southern shore of Kiser Lake.
