= Powhatan (disambiguation) =

The Powhatan were a Native American Confederacy.

Powhatan or Powhattan may also refer to:

== Places in the United States ==
- Powhatan, Arkansas, a town in Lawrence County
- Powhatan Historic State Park, Lawrence County, Arkansas
- Powhattan Township, Brown County, Kansas
  - Powhattan, Kansas, a city
- Powhatan, Louisiana, a village
- Powhatan, North Carolina, an unincorporated community
- Powhattan, Ohio, an unincorporated community
- Powhatan Point, Ohio, a village
- Powhatan County, Virginia
  - Powhatan, Virginia, a census-designated place and county seat
- Powhatan Rural Historic District, near King George, King George County, Virginia, on the National Register of Historic Places
- Fort Powhatan, near Garysville, Virginia, built during the Revolutionary War and abandoned after the Civil War
- Powhatan, West Virginia, an unincorporated community

== People ==
- Powhatan (given name)
  - Powhatan (Native American leader) (1545–1618), leader of the Powhatan Confederacy and father of Pocahontas

== Ships ==
- USS Powhatan, six United States Navy ships
- Powhatan-class tugboat, a United States Navy class
- Powhattan (1837), a ship transporting emigrants which sank in 1854 with the loss of all aboard

== Other uses ==
- Powhatan tribe, a small member tribe of the Powhatan Confederacy.
- Powhatan language, an extinct Algonquian language
- Powhatan Apartments, a Chicago landmark
- Powhatan (Five Forks, Virginia), a home on the National Register of Historic Places
- Hotel Powhatan (opened 1891), later the Powhatan College for Young Women (1900–1913), Ranson, West Virginia
- Powhatan High School, Powhatan County, Virginia
- Powhatan Arrow, a train
