= Kiser Lake Wetlands State Nature Preserve =

Nature reserve in Ohio, United States

- Kiser Lake Wetlands
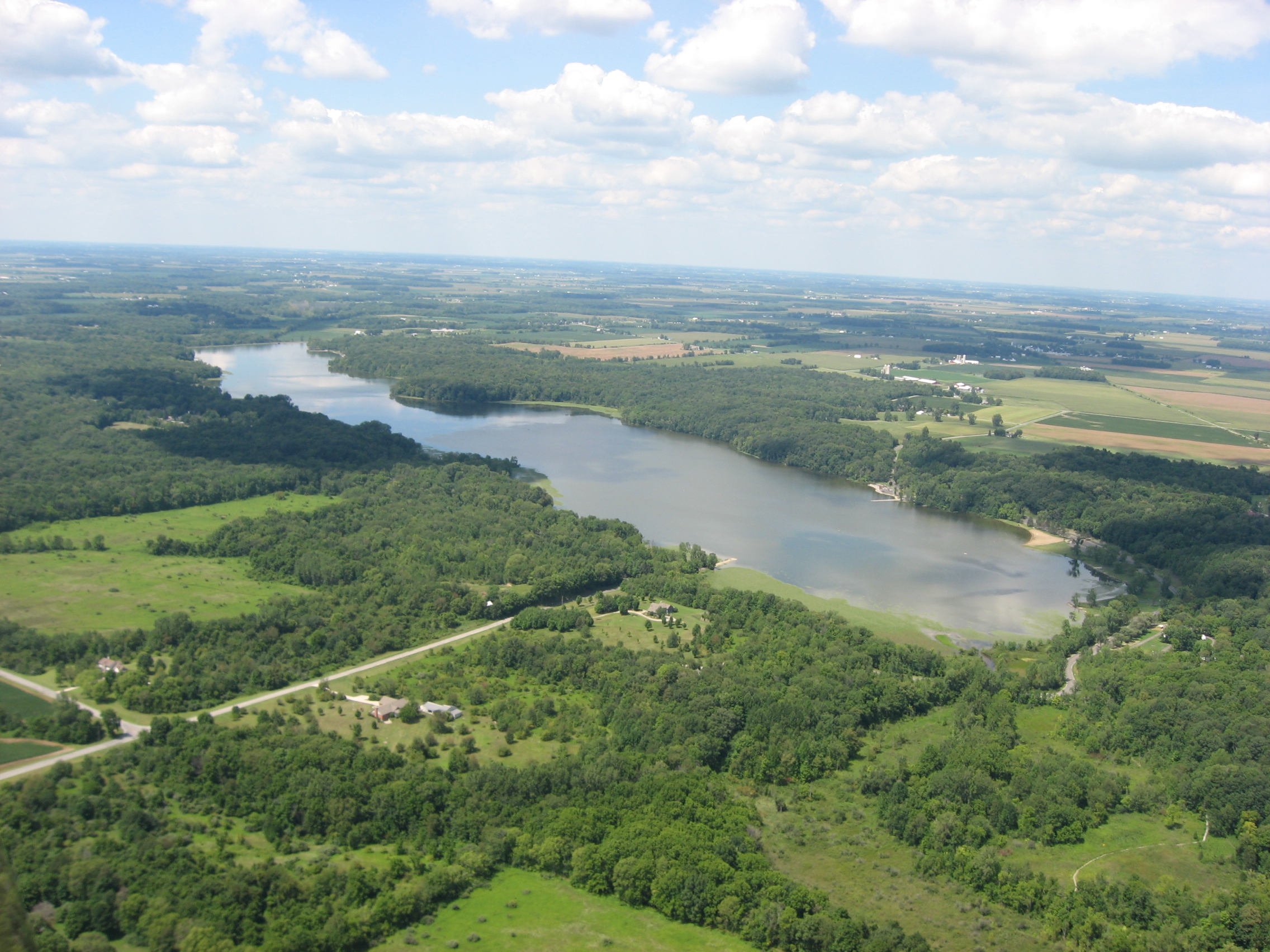
- Kiser Lake viewed from the south, wetlands are in bottom right of image

- Location within Ohio Location within the United States
- Location: Champaign County, Ohio
- Nearest city: St. Paris
- Coordinates: 40°10′38″N 83°57′00″W
- Area: 51 acres (21 ha)
- Established: 1940
- Governing body: Ohio Department of Natural Resources
- Website: Kiser Lake Wetlands Website

Kiser Lake Wetlands State Nature Preserve, or simply Kiser Lake Wetlands, is a 51 acres (21 ha) nature reserve located in Johnson Township, Champaign County, Ohio, United States. It is located wholly within the Kiser Lake State Park, and operated by the Ohio Department of Natural Resources.

== History ==
The Mosquito Creek Valley was originally formed by glaciers. The rolling wooded hills and moraines in the region formed where the glacier stopped, creating a ridge along the ice front. One moraine known as the Farmersville moraine surrounds the valley on three sides. There are mounds of sand and gravel deposits, called kame, from water melting along the glaciers' edge along the southeastern end of what is now Kiser Lake. The Kiser Lake Wetlands were formed when blocks of ice broke away from the glacier and became covered by the kame. As the climate warmed, the ice melted and left depressions in the land filled with the kame deposits which became fen and wet meadow habitats. Another geologic feature found here are larger boulders pushed or carried down from Canada, called 'glacial erratics'. The wetlands, and Mosquito Creek itself, are fed by natural springs found along the edge of the moraine, as well as rainwater runoff and the natural bowl shape of the area. This drainage and water flows in a generally northwestern direction towards the Great Miami River near Sidney in Shelby County. The eastern side of the moraine drains easterly towards the Mad River.

Although a known hunting area for the native people, the area was nothing more than a low swampy bog until a dam was built across Mosquito Creek in 1840 to power a mill. After the mill was abandoned, the remaining lake (then known as Mosquito Lake) fell into disrepair. In 1932, the land (by then known as Mosquito Lake Bog or Swamp) was donated by John W. Kiser to the state to rebuild the original lake for recreational purposes. In 1939 construction started on a new dam, and the 394 acres (159 ha) Kiser Lake was born. When Kiser Lake State Park was established for recreational purposes, the ODNR (at the time called the Division of Conservation and Natural Resources) reserved part of the land as a State Nature Preserve.

== State Park ==
The Kiser Lake Wetlands reserve consists of 51 acres (21 ha) split amongst 2 separate areas on the south side of the lake, the "Headwaters section" and the "Grandview Heights section". The Headwaters section is located at the headwaters of Kiser Lake, on the southeastern end of the lake. This section features a 0.7 miles (1.1 km) boardwalk built along part of Mosquito Creek and through the native prairie wetlands, meadows, and woods to the base of the moraine. Another trail that is part of Kiser Lake State Park starts at the end of the wetlands trail and climbs to the top of the moraine. The Grandview Heights section features a large meadow on the southwestern edge of the lake.

Among a broad variety of native plants and wildflowers, unique species including shrubby cinquefoil, Kalm's lobelia, Parnassia, smaller fringed gentian, big bluestem, queen-of-the-prairie, Ohio goldenrod, and poison sumac are found here. The reserve is also a popular wildlife and bird-watching spot.
