= Grandview Heights =

Grandview Heights may refer to the following locations:

== Canada ==
- Grandview Heights, Alberta (disambiguation), multiple locations
- Grandview Heights, Surrey, a neighbourhood in Surrey, British Columbia, Canada
  - Grandview Heights Aquatic Centre, an indoor aquatic centre
  - Grandview Heights Secondary School, a public secondary school

== New Zealand ==
- Grandview Heights, New Zealand, a suburb of Hamilton, New Zealand

== United States ==
- Grandview Heights Historic District, a neighborhood in West Palm Beach, Florida, United States
- Grandview Heights, Ohio, United States, a small city
  - Grandview Heights High School, a public high school
- Grandview Heights, Champaign County, Ohio, United States, an unincorporated community
- Grandview Heights, Jefferson County, Ohio, United States, an unincorporated community

== See also ==
- Grandview (disambiguation)
