= Johnson Township, Champaign County, Ohio =

Township in Ohio, US

- Township
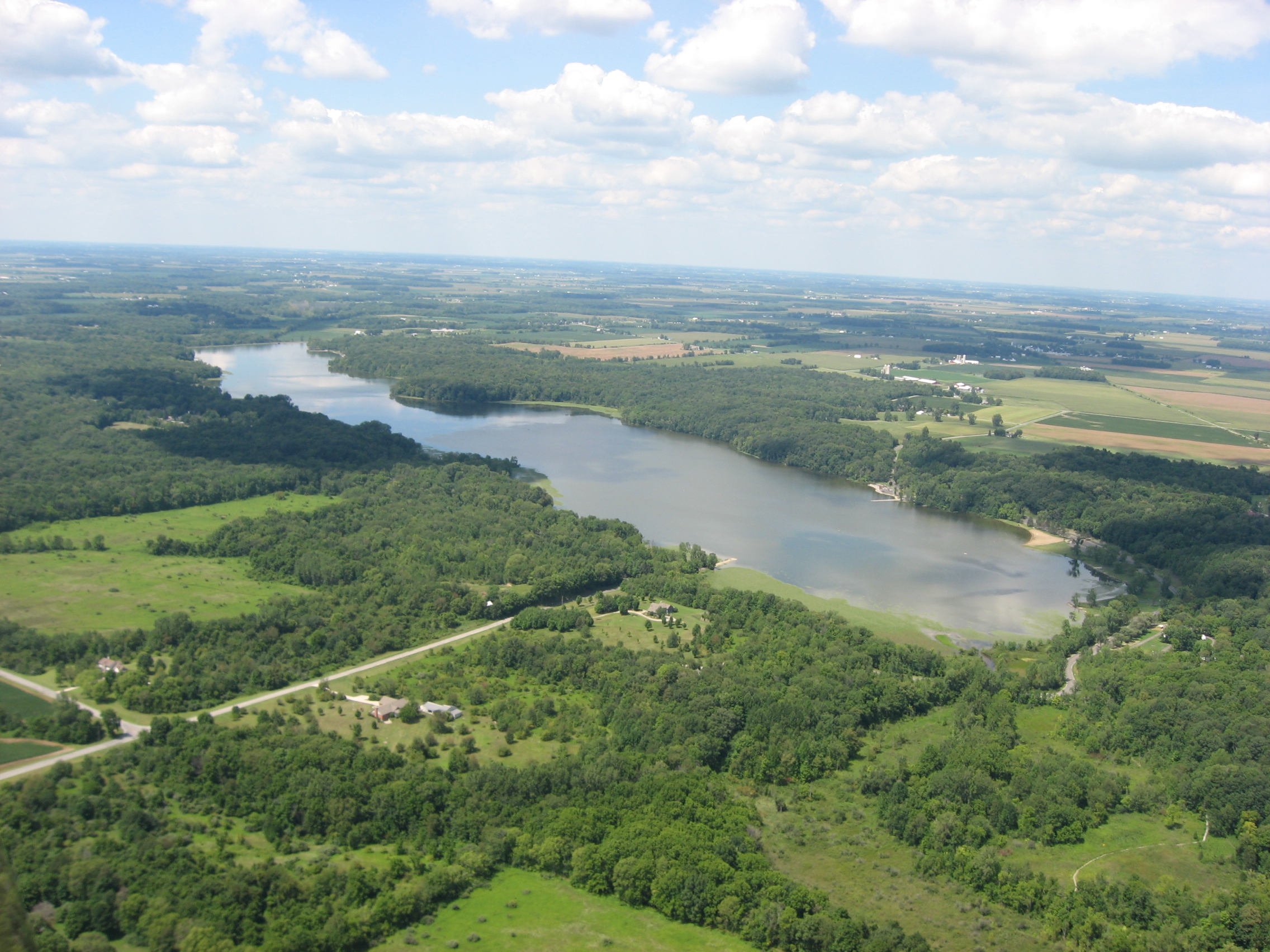
- Aerial view of Kiser Lake, a major feature of the township

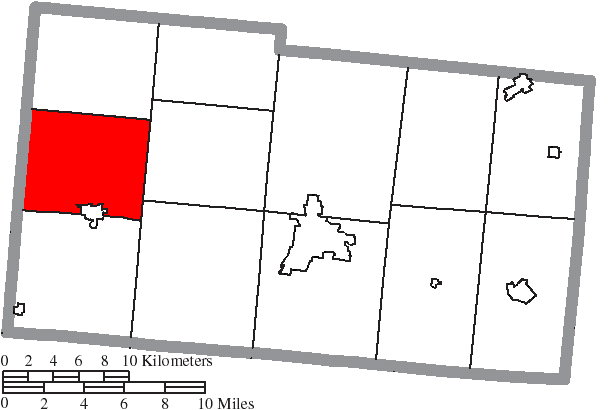
- Location of Johnson Township in Champaign County
- Coordinates: 40°9′5″N 83°57′13″W
- Country: United States
- State: Ohio
- County: Champaign

Area
  - Total: 30.6 sq mi (79.3 km^{2})
  - Land: 30.0 sq mi (77.8 km^{2})
  - Water: 0.58 sq mi (1.5 km^{2})
- Elevation: 1,171 ft (357 m)

Population (2020)
  - Total: 3,077
  - Density: 117/sq mi (45.1/km^{2})
- Time zone: UTC-5 (Eastern (EST))
  - Summer (DST): UTC-4 (EDT)
- FIPS code: 39-39228
- GNIS feature ID: 1085843
- Website: johnsontownship.com

Johnson Township is one of the twelve townships of Champaign County, Ohio, United States. The 2020 United States census reported 3,077 people living in the township, down from 3,506 in 2010.

== Geography ==
Located in the western part of the county, it borders the following townships:

- Adams Township - north
- Concord Township - east
- Mad River Township - southeast
- Jackson Township - south
- Brown Township, Miami County - west
- Green Township, Shelby County - northwest

Part of the village of St. Paris is located in southern Johnson Township, and the unincorporated community of Millerstown lies in the township's east. The Kiser Lake State Park and wetlands preserve are also located here.

== Name and history ==
It is the only Johnson Township statewide, although there is a Johnston Township in Trumbull County.

Johnson Township was established in 1821. It was named for Major Silas Johnson (Johnston), a Revolutionary War veteran and the first white person to settle in the area in 1802.

== Government ==
The township is governed by a three-member board of trustees, who are elected in November of odd-numbered years to a four-year term beginning on the following January 1. Two are elected in the year after the presidential election and one is elected in the year before it. There is also an elected township fiscal officer, who serves a four-year term beginning on April 1 of the year after the election, which is held in November of the year before the presidential election. Vacancies in the fiscal officership or on the board of trustees are filled by the remaining trustees.
