= Northville =

Northville may refer to several places:

In Canada:

- Northville, Ontario, a community in municipality of Lambton Shores

In the United States:

- Northville, Connecticut
- Northville Township, LaSalle County, Illinois
- Northville, Michigan
- Northville Township, Michigan
- Northville, Fulton County, New York
- Northville, Suffolk County, New York
- Northville, Ohio
- Northville, South Dakota
