= Crayon (disambiguation) =

A crayon is a stick of colored wax, charcoal, chalk or other material used for writing and drawing.

Crayon may also refer to:

- Crayon (band), American indiepop band
- "Crayon" (song)", a 2012 song by G-Dragon
- "Crayon", a song by Manitoba from his 2003 album Up in Flames
- Crayons (album), a 2008 album by Donna Summer, or the title track
- "Crayons" (song), a 2018 song by Cupcakke
- Le crayon, a nickname for the Tour du Crédit Lyonnais
- Crayon (film), 2010 Malaysian family drama film directed by Dean A. Burhanuddin
- Crayon, Ohio, a community in the United States
- Crayon Shin-chan, comedic comic and TV series by Yoshito Usui

== See also ==
- Craiyon
