= Middletown, Champaign County, Ohio =

Unincorporated community in Ohio, U.S.

Coordinates: 40°11′30″N 83°37′09″W

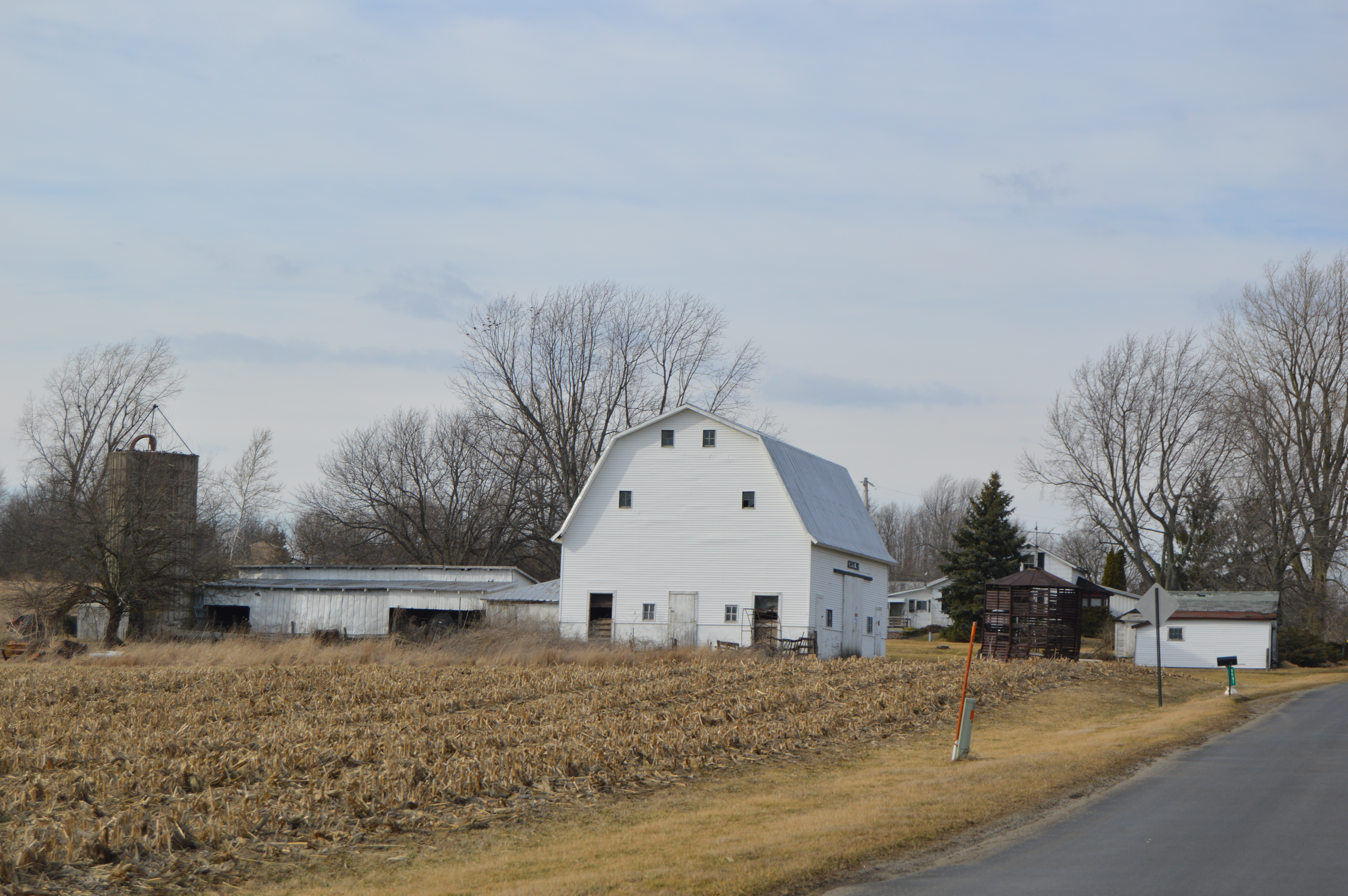
Farm on Middletown's southern edge

Middletown is an unincorporated community in Champaign County, in the U.S. state of Ohio.

== History ==
Middletown was laid out in 1833, and named for its inland location between Mingo and Cable.
