= Millerstown, Champaign County, Ohio =

Unincorporated community in Ohio, U.S.

Coordinates: 40°09′25″N 83°55′17″W

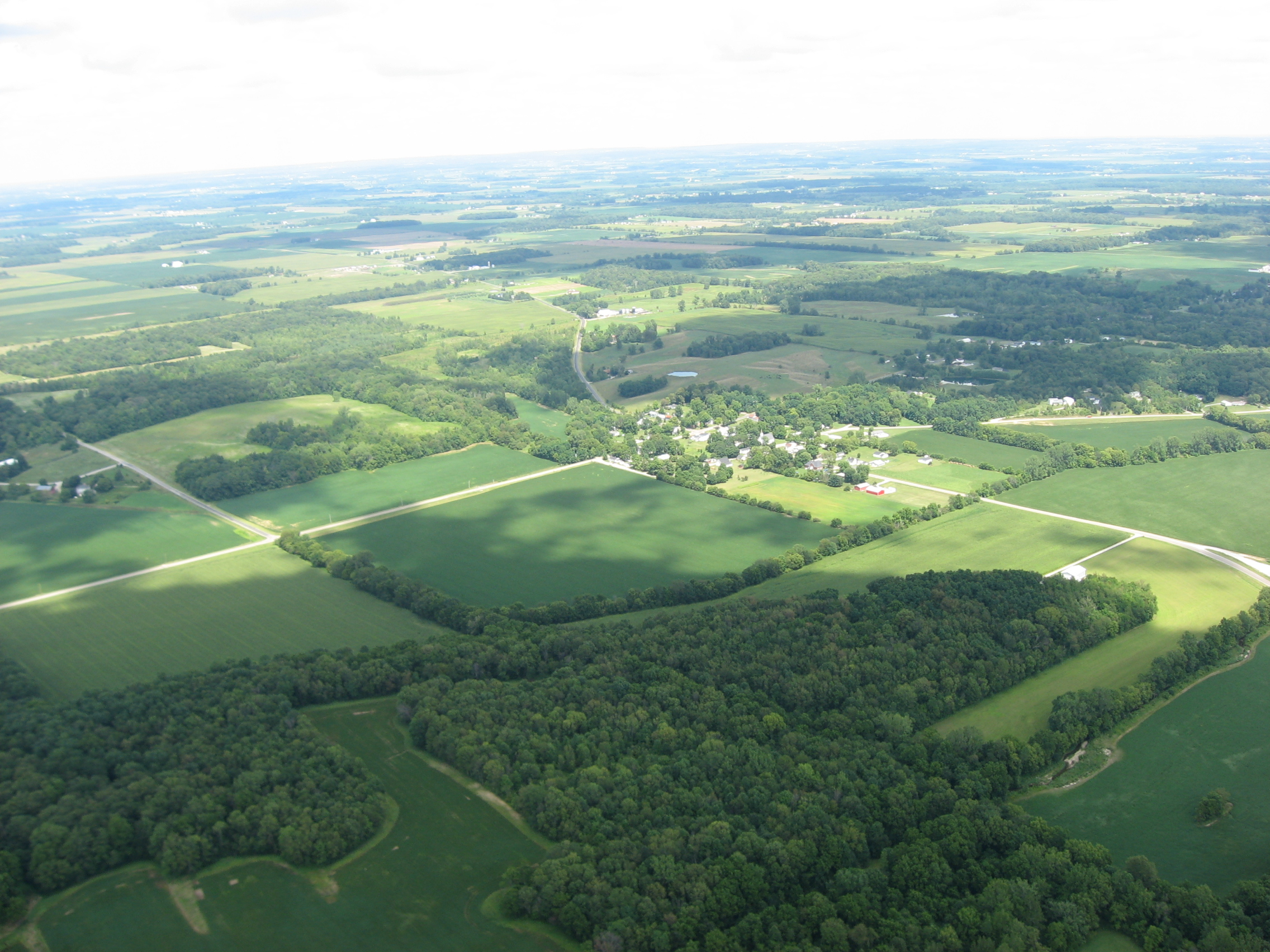
Millerstown and surrounding countryside

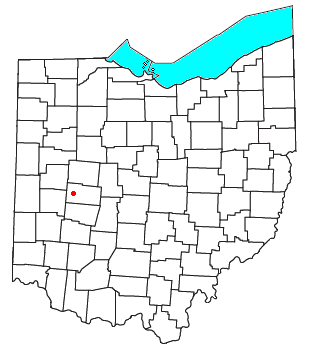
Location of Millerstown, Ohio

Millerstown is an unincorporated community in eastern Johnson Township, Champaign County, Ohio, United States. It lies at the intersection of Heck Hill, Ward, and Zimmerman Roads, 2 1/2 miles (4.0 km) north of U.S. Route 36. Nettle Creek, a tributary of the Mad River, flows past Millerstown. It is located approximately 4 miles (6½ km) northeast of the city of St. Paris and 10 miles (16 km) west-northwest of the city of Urbana, the county seat of Champaign County.

== History ==
Millerstown was platted in 1837. The community was named for early landowner Casper Miller. A post office was established at Millerstown in 1838, and remained in operation until 1903.
