= Darnell, Ohio =

Unincorporated community in Ohio, U.S.

Coordinates: 40°04′18″N 83°56′12″W

Darnell is an unincorporated community in Champaign County, in the U.S. state of Ohio.

== History ==
Darnell was laid out in 1893 by one Mr. Darnell, and named for him. A post office called Darnell was established in 1899, and discontinued in 1901.
