= Lippincott, Ohio =

Community in Champaign County, Ohio, US

- Unincorporated community
- Location within Ohio
- Coordinates: 40°11′37″N 83°46′32″W
- Country: United States
- State: Ohio
- Counties: Champaign
- Elevation: 1,056 ft (322 m)
- Time zone: UTC-5 (Eastern (EST))
  - Summer (DST): UTC-4 (EDT)
- ZIP code: 43078
- Area codes: 937, 326
- GNIS feature ID: 1065005

Lippincott is an unincorporated community in Salem Township, Champaign County, Ohio, United States. It is located between Urbana and West Liberty near the intersection of Upper Valley Pike (County Road 14) and Lippincott Road (County Road 115).

The community of Lippincott was never platted, but a general store was located here at one time. Records are not clear as to when the store was built or opened, but there are no records of a Lippincott in the 1784 Atlas of Champaign County. In 1914, the original building was purchased and demolished, and a new building stood in that spot until 1997.

The Mad River flows past, and the Mad River Wilderness Area is located here.
