= Catawba Station, Ohio =

Unincorporated community in Ohio, U.S.

Coordinates: 40°01′46″N 83°39′06″W

Catawba Station (also known as Catawba) is an unincorporated community in Champaign County, in the U.S. state of Ohio.

== History ==
Catawba Station had its start as a station and shipping point on the Big Four Railroad, but the community never outgrew its original purpose.
