= USS Powhatan =

Six ships of the United States Navy have borne the name USS Powhatan or USNS Powhatan, named in honor of Powhatan (1550–1618), an Indian chief in tidewater Virginia; the father of Pocahontas.

- USS Powhatan (1850), first ship of the name, was a sidewheel steam frigate, launched in 1850 and scrapped in 1887.
- USS Powhatan, second ship of the name, was a sidewheel gunboat transferred by the War Department to the Navy on 21 April 1861 and renamed USS King Philip on 4 November 1861.
- USS Powhatan (1898), third ship of the name, was a tugboat purchased in 1898. Her name was changed to Cayuga (YT-12) in 1917; she was scrapped in 1928.
- USS Powhatan (ID-3013), originally Hamburg, was built in 1899. Fourth ship of the name, she was commissioned as a troop transport and renamed Powhatan in 1917. She decommissioned in 1919 and was turned over to the Army Transport Service.
- USS Powhatan (YT-128), fifth ship of the name, was a tugboat launched in 1938. She was reclassified YTM-128 in 1944. She was active until 1970, sold for scrap in 1976, and was subsequently lost while under tow by USNS San Juan to a scrapper in the Carolinas.
- USNS Powhatan (T-ATF-166), sixth ship of the name, was a fleet ocean tug operated by the Military Sealift Command to provide the U.S. Navy with towing service which entered service on 15 June 1979 and left service on 26 February 1999. As of May 2008, ex-Powhatan was stricken from the Military Sealift Command and leased to a private towing and salvage company for 10 years. At the recent completion of that lease, the U.S. Navy transferred the vessel to the Turkish Navy. Due to the poor condition of the vessel upon termination of the lease, BAV has overseen the refit of the vessel to include completely rebuilding of all engines and generators. Located in a shipyard in Charleston, South Carolina, the ex-Powhatan was re-commissioned into the Turkish Navy as TCG Inebolu recently after being completely prepped and repainted. As engine rebuilds near completion, preparations are being made for dock trials, sea trials, and then the long trek home to Turkey.
