= Terre Haute, Ohio =

Unincorporated community in Ohio, U.S.

Coordinates: 40°02′58″N 83°52′41″W

Terre Haute is an unincorporated community in Champaign County, in the U.S. state of Ohio.

== History ==
Terre Haute was laid out and platted in 1836. The community was so named on account of its lofty elevation, Terre Haute being a name derived from the French meaning "high ground". A post office called Terre Haute was established in 1846, and discontinued in 1900.
