= Christiansburg, Ohio =

- Village
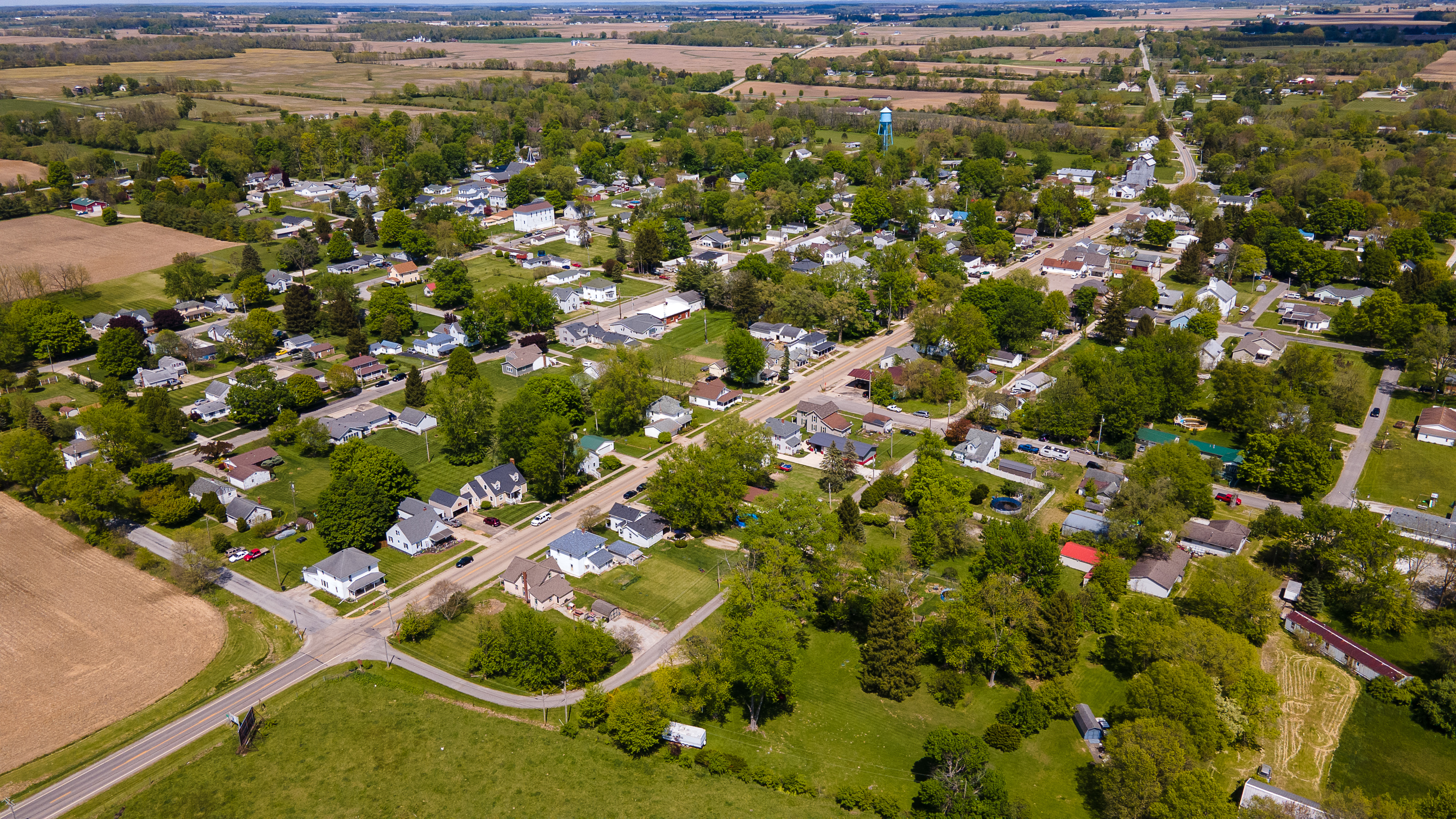
- Christiansburg, 2021

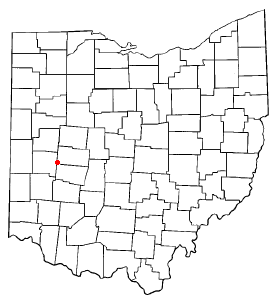
- Location of Christiansburg, Ohio

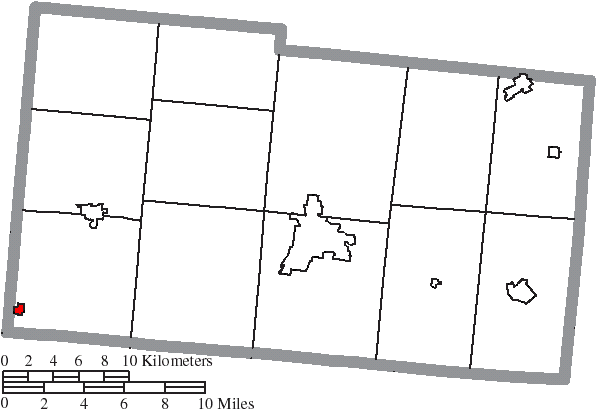
- Location of Christiansburg in Champaign County
- Coordinates: 40°03′24″N 84°01′32″W
- Country: United States
- State: Ohio
- County: Champaign
- Township: Jackson

Area
  - Total: 0.24 sq mi (0.62 km^{2})
  - Land: 0.24 sq mi (0.62 km^{2})
  - Water: 0 sq mi (0.00 km^{2})
- Elevation: 1,112 ft (339 m)

Population (2020)
  - Total: 505
  - Estimate (2023): 501
  - Density: 2,126.1/sq mi (820.91/km^{2})
- Time zone: UTC-5 (Eastern (EST))
  - Summer (DST): UTC-4 (EDT)
- ZIP code: 45389
- Area codes: 937, 326
- FIPS code: 39-14296
- GNIS feature ID: 2397624
- Website: www.christiansburgohio.org

Christiansburg is a village in Champaign County, Ohio, United States. The population was 505 at the 2020 census.

== History ==
Christiansburg was platted in 1817, and named after Christiansburg, Virginia, the native home of a first settler. A post office called Christiansburg has been in operation since 1833. However, this post office (ZIP code 45389) is a PO Box-only office; street delivery is not offered to residents who live in the village limits, and mail can only be delivered to a household's PO Box. Christiansburg was incorporated in 1835.

== Geography ==
According to the United States Census Bureau, the village has a total area of 0.22 square miles (0.57 km^{2}), all of it land.

== Demographics ==
Historical population
Census	Pop.	Note	%±
1920	473		—
1930	482		1.9%
1940	536		11.2%
1950	666		24.3%
1960	788		18.3%
1970	724		−8.1%
1980	593		−18.1%
1990	599		1.0%
2000	553		−7.7%
2010	526		−4.9%
2020	505		−4.0%
2023 (est.)	501	▼	−0.8%
U.S. Decennial Census

As of the census of 2000, there were 553 people, 216 households, and 157 families living in the village. The population density was 2,563.3 inhabitants per square mile (989.7/km^{2}). There were 230 housing units at an average density of 1,066.1 per square mile (411.6/km^{2}). The racial makeup of the village was 98.73% White, 0.36% African American, 0.18% Native American, 0.36% Asian, 0.18% from other races, and 0.18% from two or more races. Hispanic or Latino of any race were 0.18% of the population.

There were 216 households, out of which 31.9% had children under the age of 18 living with them, 58.3% were married couples living together, 8.8% had a female householder with no husband present, and 27.3% were non-families. 23.6% of all households were made up of individuals, and 13.4% had someone living alone who was 65 years of age or older. The average household size was 2.56 and the average family size was 3.04.

In the village, the population was spread out, with 23.5% under the age of 18, 9.8% from 18 to 24, 29.3% from 25 to 44, 22.4% from 45 to 64, and 15.0% who were 65 years of age or older. The median age was 37 years. For every 100 females there were 90.0 males. For every 100 females age 18 and over, there were 97.7 males.

The median income for a household in the village was $32,500, and the median income for a family was $38,125. Males had a median income of $31,719 versus $25,588 for females. The per capita income for the village was $16,877. About 7.1% of families and 6.7% of the population were below the poverty line, including 10.4% of those under age 18 and 3.8% of those age 65 or over.

=== 2010 census ===
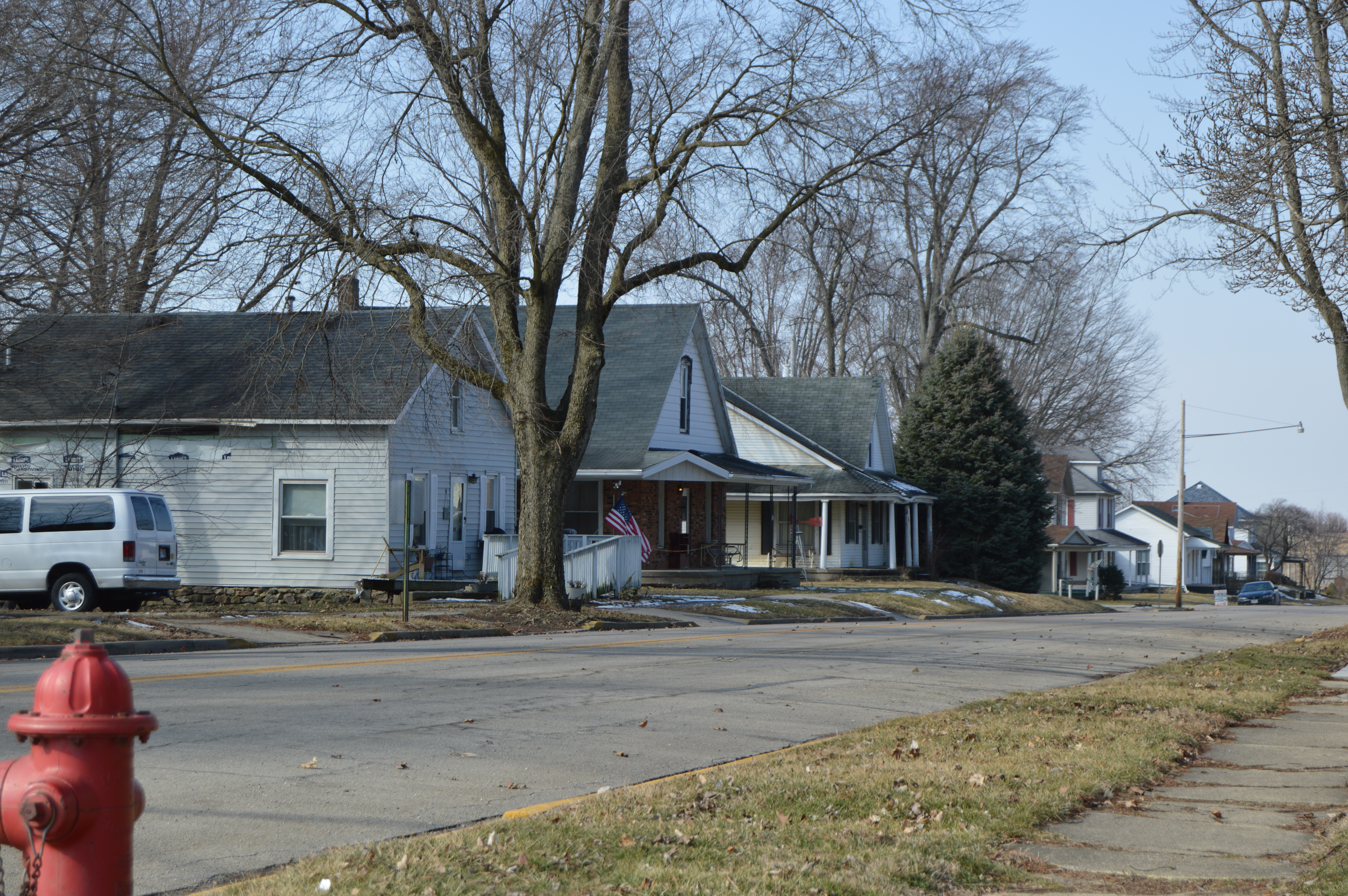
Houses on Pike Street

As of the census of 2010, there were 526 people, 217 households, and 143 families living in the village. The population density was 2,390.9 inhabitants per square mile (923.1/km^{2}). There were 252 housing units at an average density of 1,145.5 per square mile (442.3/km^{2}). The racial makeup of the village was 96.0% White, 0.6% Native American, 0.2% Asian, 1.1% from other races, and 2.1% from two or more races. Hispanic or Latino of any race were 1.3% of the population.

There were 217 households, of which 29.5% had children under the age of 18 living with them, 47.5% were married couples living together, 12.9% had a female householder with no husband present, 5.5% had a male householder with no wife present, and 34.1% were non-families. 28.1% of all households were made up of individuals, and 13.4% had someone living alone who was 65 years of age or older. The average household size was 2.42 and the average family size was 2.94.

The median age in the village was 39.6 years. 25.1% of residents were under the age of 18; 6.3% were between the ages of 18 and 24; 24.9% were from 25 to 44; 26.9% were from 45 to 64; and 16.9% were 65 years of age or older. The gender makeup of the village was 49.2% male and 50.8% female.

== Notable people ==
- Marion Ross - Civil war veteran, Medal of Honor recipient
