= Carysville, Ohio =

Unincorporated community in Ohio, U.S.

Coordinates: 40°12′43″N 83°58′51″W

Carysville is an unincorporated community in Adams Township, Champaign County, in the U.S. state of Ohio.

== History ==
Carysville was platted in 1830 by Calvin Cary, and named for him. A post office called Carysville was established in 1837, and remained in operation until 1901.
