= Eris, Ohio =

Unincorporated community in Ohio, U.S.

Coordinates: 40°09′22″N 83°51′10″W

Eris is an unincorporated community in Champaign County, in the U.S. state of Ohio.

== History ==
Eris was not officially platted. A post office called Eris was established in 1885 and remained in operation until 1903. In the early 20th century, Eris was said to have two stores, a barber shop, a blacksmith, a cider press, and a slaughterhouse, in addition to the post office. Apples were a major crop.
