= Grandview Heights, Alberta =

Grandview Heights, Alberta may refer to:

- Grandview Heights, Edmonton, a neighbourhood in Edmonton, Alberta
- Grandview Heights, Sturgeon County, Alberta, a locality in Sturgeon County, Alberta
- Grandview Heights, Wetaskiwin County No. 10, Alberta, a locality in Wetaskiwin County No. 10, Alberta

== See also ==
- Grandview Heights (disambiguation)
