= Fountain Park, Ohio =

Unincorporated community in Ohio, U.S.

Coordinates: 40°09′54″N 83°33′15″W

Fountain Park is an unincorporated community in Champaign County, in the U.S. state of Ohio.

== History ==
Fountain Park was platted in 1883. A post office called Fountain Park was established in 1886, and remained in operation until 1904.
