= Champaign County Courthouse (Ohio) =

Local government building in the United States

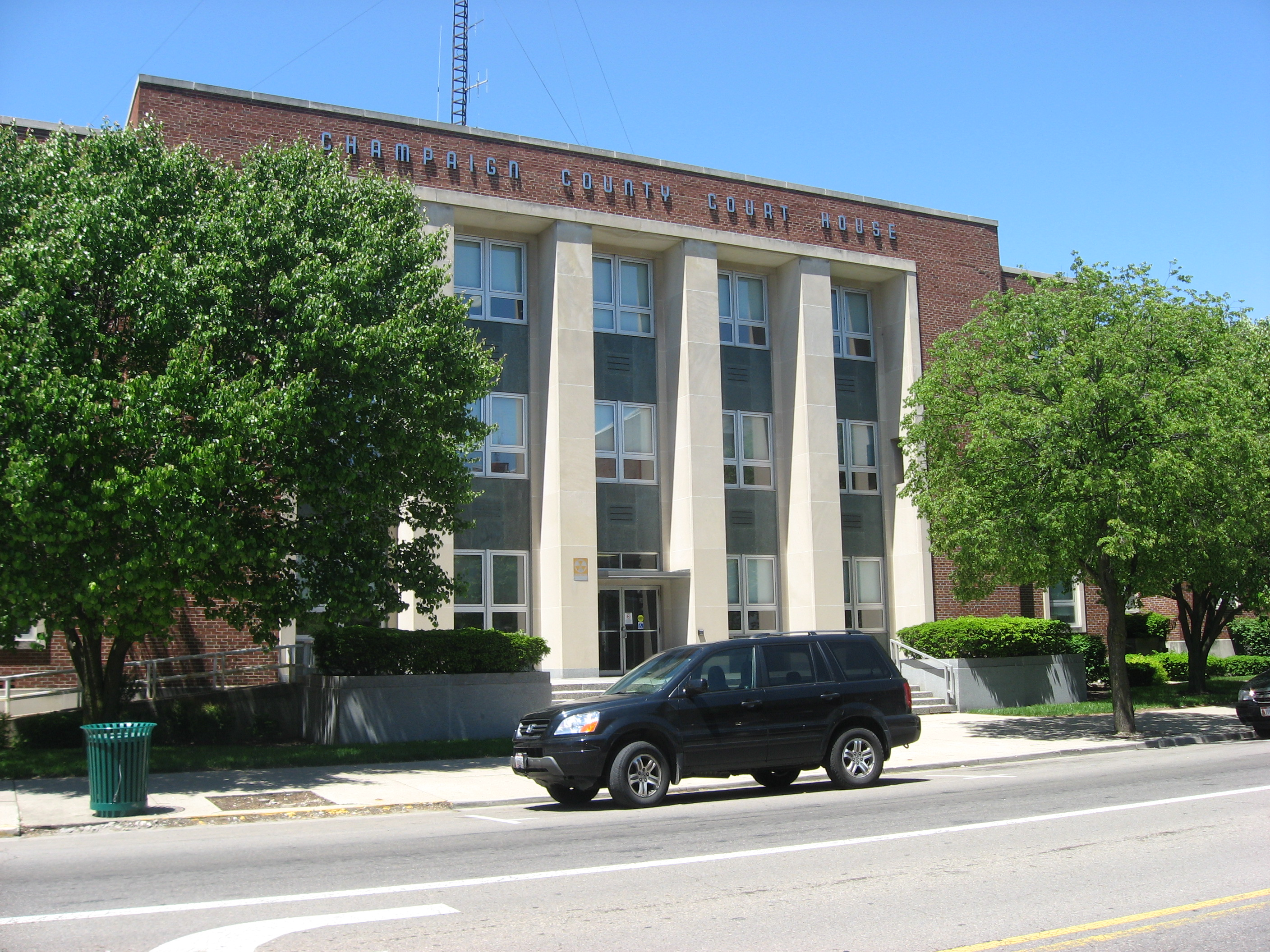
Front of the courthouse

The Champaign County Courthouse is located at 200 North Main Street in Urbana, Ohio, United States. The courthouse is designed in the International style prevalent in the 1950s by Phillip T. Partridge. The current building is the fifth for the county. The courthouse is included within the bounds of the Urbana Monument Square Historic District, but is not a contributing property.

== History ==
Champaign County was established in 1805 and the county seat was placed at Springfield. Until 1807 the courts met in the home of a local citizen, George Fithian. Unfortunately, most of the county records relating to this period of history were lost. The county seat was removed to Urbana in 1807.

Even though the land was set aside for a courthouse on a public square, the courthouse was built elsewhere. This structure was a simple log house which was converted into a private home after the court relocated. During the War of 1812 the courthouse was used as an army hospital and the court was removed to the upper story of the county jail. This arrangement continued until 1817 when a new courthouse was finished.

The county decided on a new courthouse and construction began on the public square in 1814 and was completed in 1817. This two-story brick structure had a central entrance located on the front facade and a central bell tower. The bell would ring to alert local citizens of public meetings, fires, births or deaths. A special club was used in the most important events and produced a distinctive high-pitched tone.

The county decided to build a new courthouse in 1837 and chose a site once again removed from the public square. The site chosen was the corner of North Main Street and East Court Street, which is still the present site of the courthouse. This courthouse was designed by the architectural firm of Hall and Sheldon and was completed ahead of schedule in 1839. This two-story brick structure was later remodeled in 1880 after it was deemed to be dangerous. The remodeling used the plans of the courthouse in Hillsboro right down to the new classical portico with Ionic columns and belltower. This new remodel was considered by many to fireproof the building. This was to be proved wrong on January 20, 1948, when a fire destroyed the building.

The fire of the courthouse placed the county in a bind. With no money in the budget for construction, several ballots were voted on to raise funds but were all defeated. A group of citizens campaigned for a final bond which passed with a sum of $650,000. This was not enough so the county officials decided to pay for the cost to equip the courthouse out of the county's fund which left restricted spending for several years.

Architect Phillip Partridge was selected to design the fifth courthouse. He designed the building in the International style of the 1950s. The building was dedicated to much ceremony on June 8, 1957. Attending this ceremony was Governor C. William O'Neill, whose speech preceded the open house.

== Exterior ==
The courthouse called for four floors but this was deleted after realizing this would cost too much. The building is constructed in the International style, which calls for little or no external decoration. The walls are made up of red brick with large rectangular window panels. The recessed entrance is reached by a flight of stairs and is framed by 4 large square pillars of granite blocks.
