= Bowlusville, Ohio =

Unincorporated community in Ohio, U.S.

Coordinates: 40°01′35″N 83°47′55″W

Bowlusville is an unincorporated community in Champaign County, in the U.S. state of Ohio.

== History ==
Bowlusville was platted in 1863 by Samuel H. Bowlus, and named for him. A post office was established at Bowlusville in 1861, and remained in operation until 1920.
