= Jackson Township, Champaign County, Ohio =

Township in Ohio, US

- Township
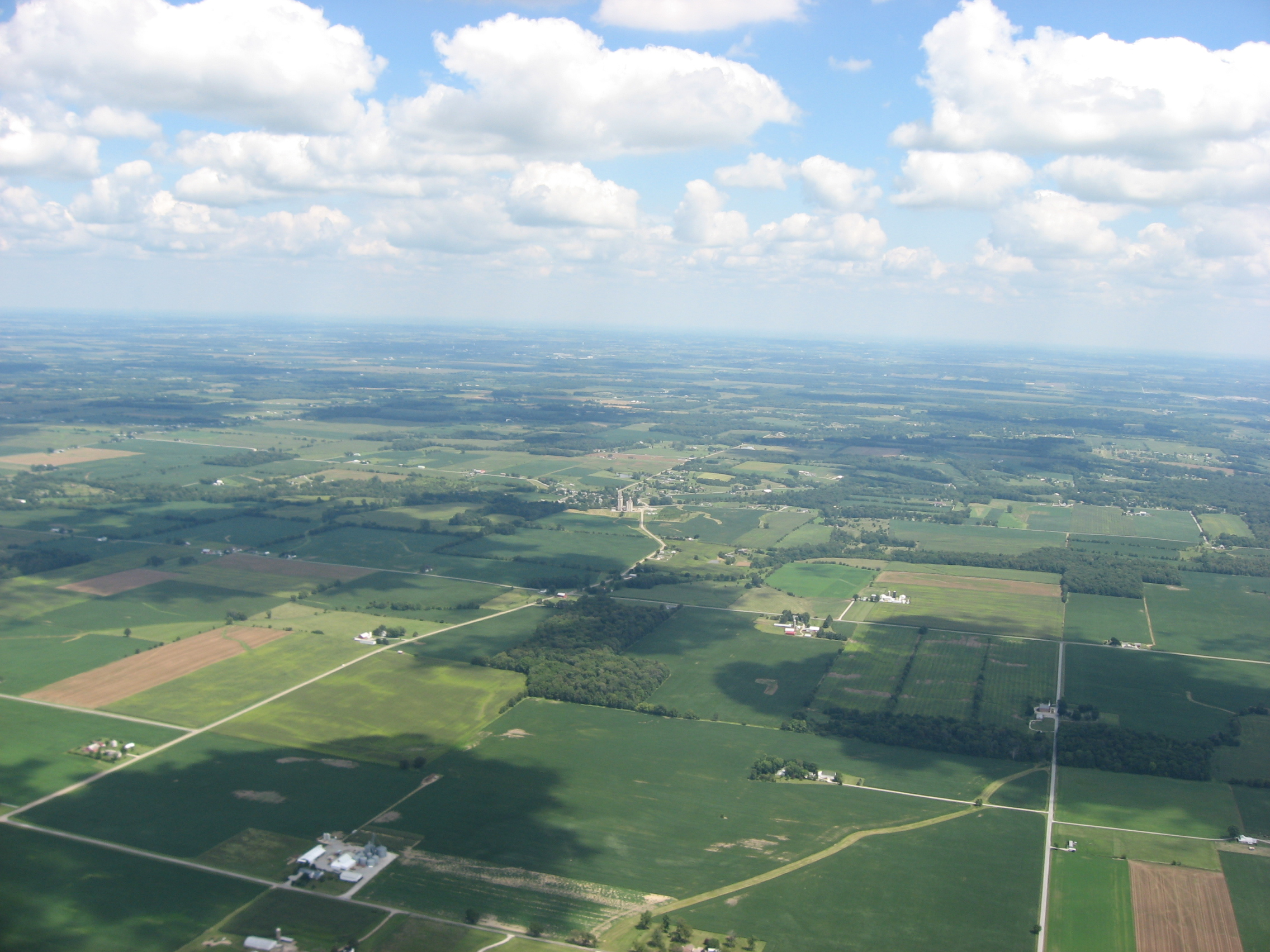
- Countryside in southeastern Jackson Township

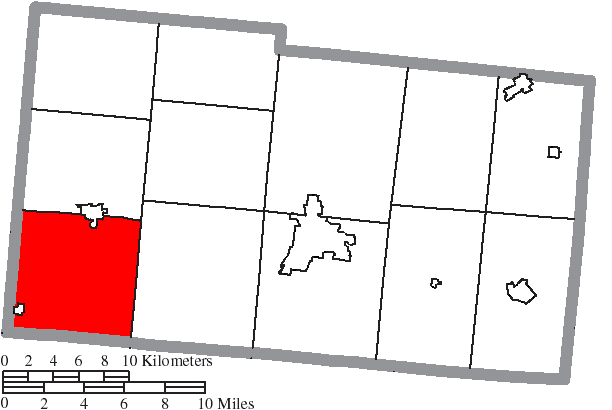
- Location of Jackson Township in Champaign County
- Coordinates: 40°4′36″N 83°58′43″W
- Country: United States
- State: Ohio
- County: Champaign

Area
  - Total: 37.4 sq mi (96.8 km^{2})
  - Land: 37.4 sq mi (96.8 km^{2})
  - Water: 0 sq mi (0.0 km^{2})
- Elevation: 1,191 ft (363 m)

Population (2020)
  - Total: 2,555
  - Density: 68.4/sq mi (26.4/km^{2})
- Time zone: UTC-5 (Eastern (EST))
  - Summer (DST): UTC-4 (EDT)
- FIPS code: 39-37702
- GNIS feature ID: 1085842

Jackson Township is one of the twelve townships of Champaign County, Ohio, United States. The 2020 census reported 2,555 people living in the township.

== Geography ==
Located in the southwestern corner of the county, it borders the following townships:

- Johnson Township - north
- Mad River Township - east
- German Township, Clark County - southeast corner
- Pike Township, Clark County - south
- Elizabeth Township, Miami County - southwest corner
- Lostcreek Township, Miami County - west
- Brown Township, Miami County - northwest

Two villages are located in Jackson Township: Christiansburg in the southwest, and part of St. Paris in the north. The unincorporated community of Thackery lies in the township's southeast.

== Name and history ==
Jackson Township is named for Andrew Jackson. It is one of thirty-seven Jackson Townships statewide.

== Government ==
The township is governed by a three-member board of trustees, who are elected in November of odd-numbered years to a four-year term beginning on the following January 1. Two are elected in the year after the presidential election and one is elected in the year before it. There is also an elected township fiscal officer, who serves a four-year term beginning on April 1 of the year after the election, which is held in November of the year before the presidential election. Vacancies in the fiscal officership or on the board of trustees are filled by the remaining trustees.
