= Thackery, Ohio =

Unincorporated community in Ohio, U.S.

Coordinates: 40°03′20″N 83°55′08″W

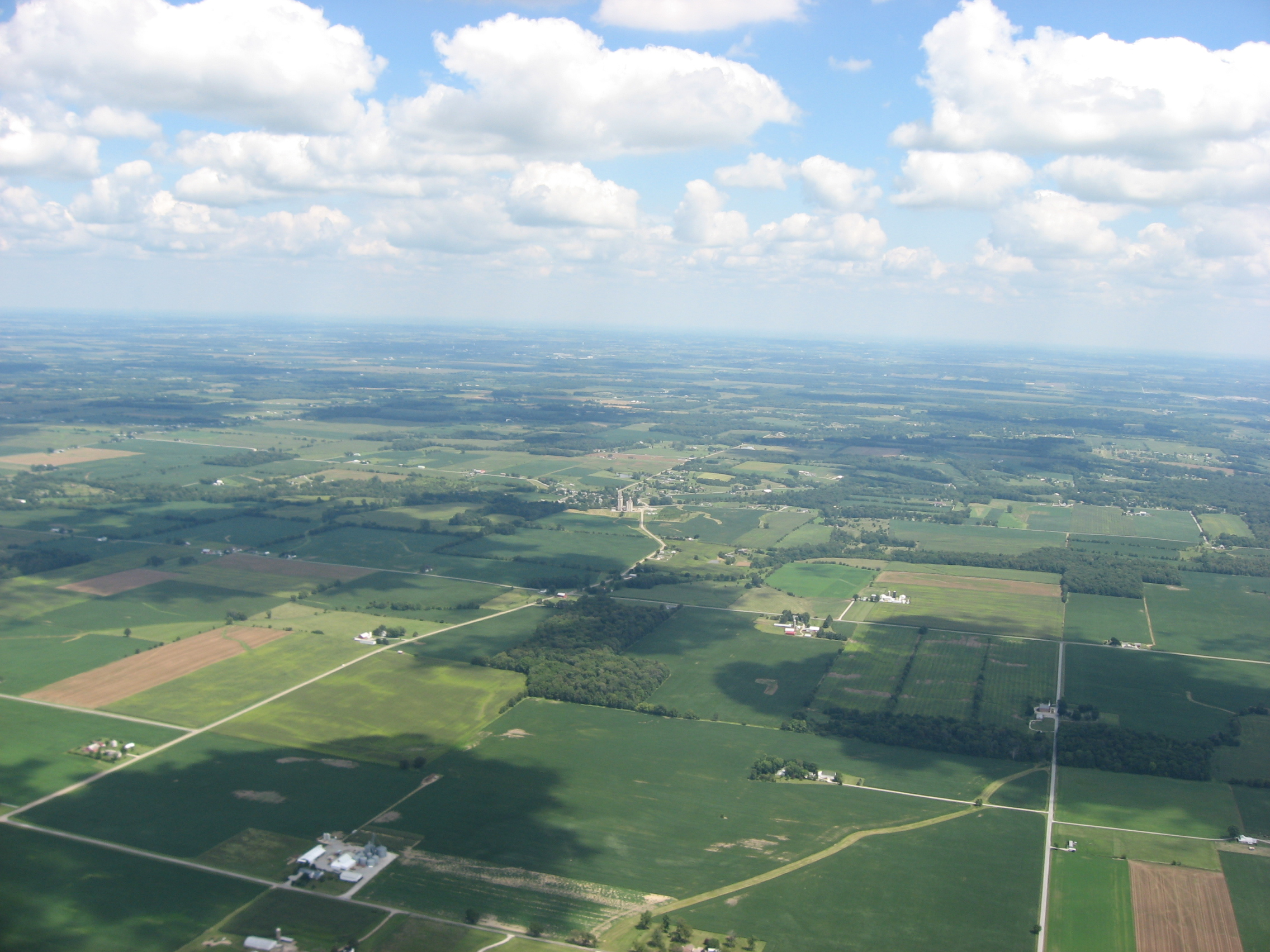
Thackery and surrounding countryside

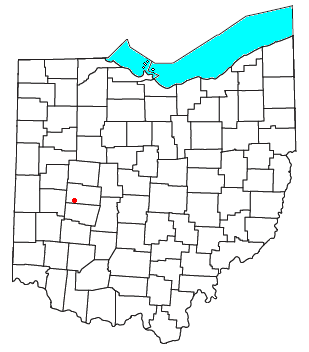
Location of Thackery, Ohio

Thackery is an unincorporated community in southeastern Jackson and southwestern Mad River Townships in Champaign County, Ohio, United States. It lies along State Route 55, southwest of the city of Urbana, the county seat of Champaign County.

== History ==
A post office called Thackery was established in 1894, and remained in operation until 1965. The community was named for its founder, one Mr. Thackery.
