= Five Points, Champaign County, Ohio =

Community in Champaign County, Ohio, US

Five Points, Ohio
- Unincorporated community
- Location within Ohio
- Coordinates: 40°06′03″N 83°32′38″W
- Country: United States
- State: Ohio
- Counties: Champaign
- Elevation: 1,102 ft (336 m)
- Time zone: UTC-5 (Eastern (EST))
  - Summer (DST): UTC-4 (EDT)
- ZIP code: 45335
- Area codes: 937, 326
- GNIS feature ID: 1040481

Five Points is an unincorporated community in Goshen Township, Champaign County, Ohio, United States. It is located north of Mechanicsburg at the intersection of Ohio State Route 161, Ohio State Route 559, and Bullard-Rutan Road (Township Road 205), at 40°06′03″N 83°32′38″W.
