= Rosewood, Ohio =

Census-designated place in Champaign County, Ohio, United States

Coordinates: 40°13′03″N 83°57′48″W

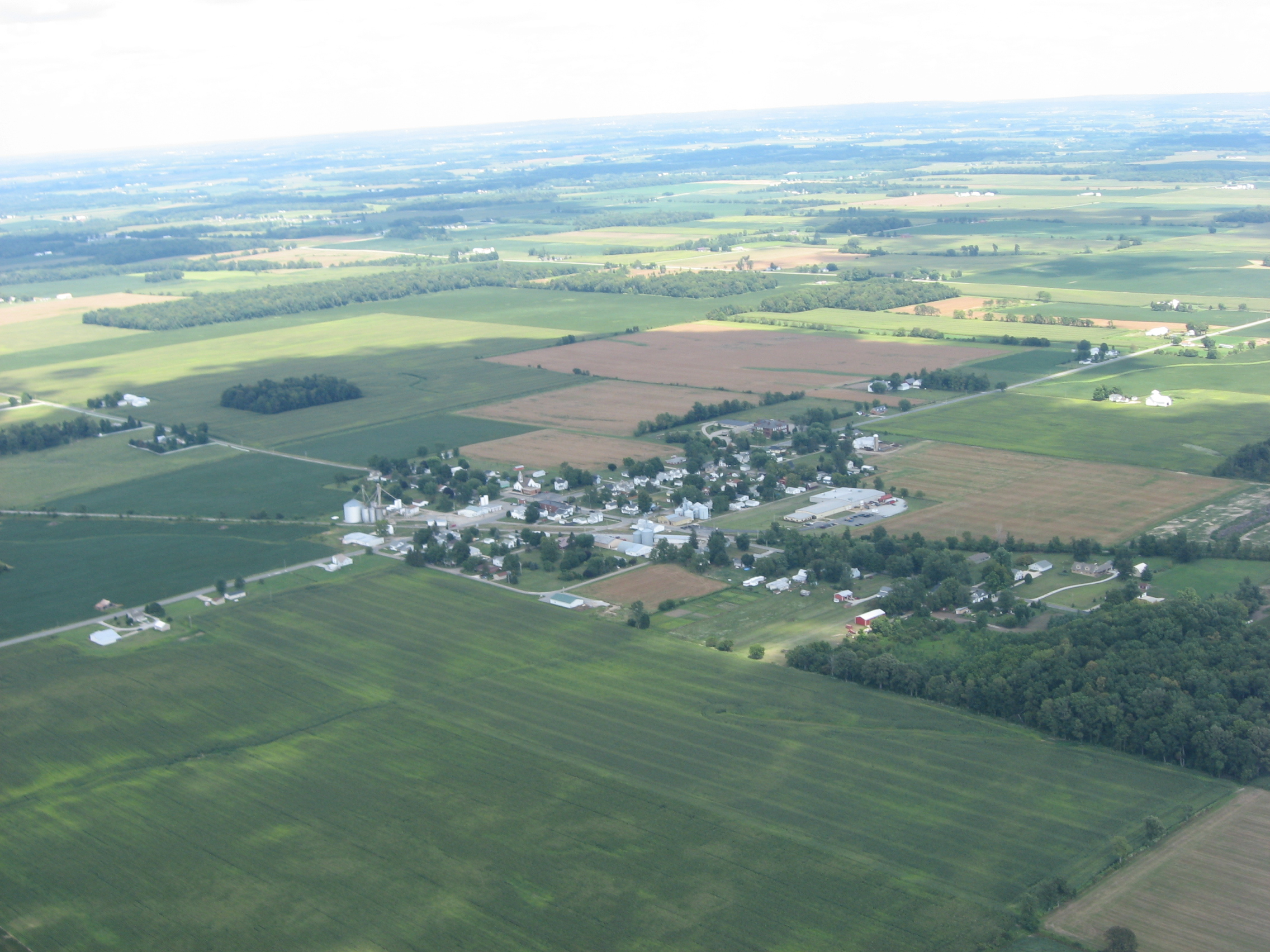
Rosewood and surrounding countryside, August 2008

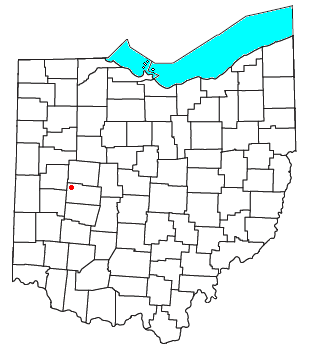
Location of Rosewood, Ohio

Rosewood is a census-designated place (CDP) in northwestern Adams Township, Champaign County, Ohio, United States. As of the 2020 United States census it had a population of 224.

== Description ==
The CDP has a post office with the ZIP code 43070. It lies along State Route 29, an east–west highway.

== History ==
Rosewood was laid out and platted in 1893 when the railroad was extended to that point. A post office has been in operation at Rosewood since 1894.
