= Kiser Lake (Ohio) =

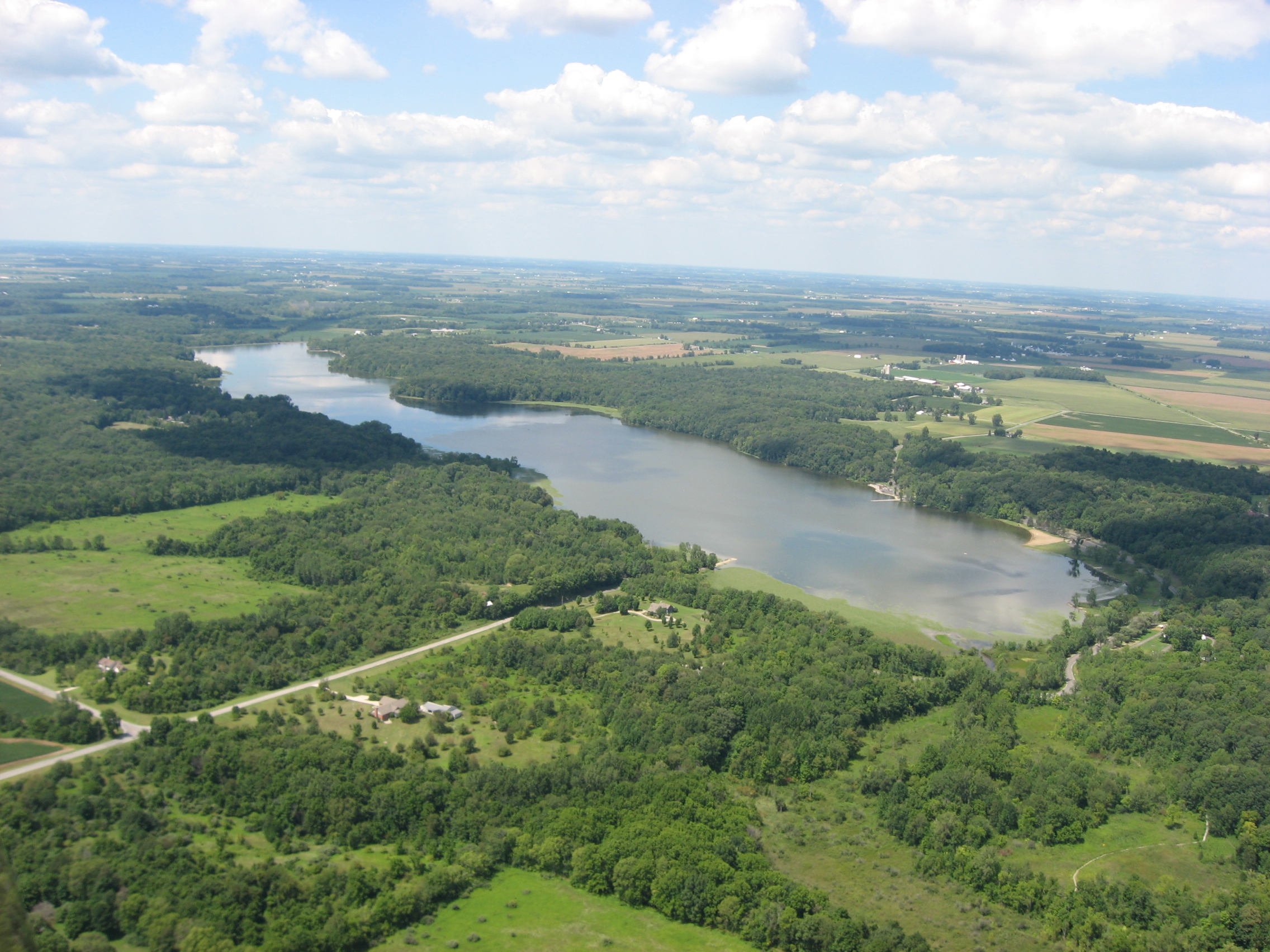
- Kiser Lake viewed from the south

- Location within Ohio
- Location: Champaign County, Ohio, USA
- Coordinates: 40°11′17″N 83°57′56″W
- Type: Reservoir
- Basin countries: United States
- Max. length: 2.5 miles (4.0 km)
- Max. width: 0.3 miles (0.48 km)
- Surface area: 394 acres (159 ha)
- Average depth: 18 feet (5.5 m)
- Shore length^{1}: 5.3 miles (8.5 km)
- Surface elevation: 1,063 feet (324 m)
- ^{1} Shore length is not a well-defined measure.

Kiser Lake (previously also known as Mosquito Lake) is a reservoir in Champaign County, Ohio, United States, It is located approximately 4.2 miles (6.8 km) northwest of St. Paris and 34 miles (55 km) north of Dayton along Ohio State Route 235, at 40°11′17″N 83°57′56″W.

The 51-acre (21 ha) Kiser Lake Wetlands State Nature Preserve sits at the headwaters on the southeastern edge of the lake, and the 531 acres (215 ha) Kiser Lake State Park surrounds the rest of the lake to the north.

== History ==
Mosquito Lake was first created in 1840, when a dam was built across Mosquito Creek in the low, swampy region of Champaign County known as Mosquito Creek Valley to build a grist and saw mill. After operations at the mill were shut down, the dam and lake were neglected for several years. In 1932, John W. Kiser and his family owned the land and donated several hundred acres to the State of Ohio to rebuild the lake for recreational purposes. In 1939, work on the dam started, and in 1940, all work was completed on the dam and Kiser Lake was filled.

The lake is maintained by the Ohio Department of Natural Resources.
