= Powhattan, Ohio =

Unincorporated community in Ohio, U.S.

Coordinates: 40°02′32″N 83°41′24″W

Powhattan is an unincorporated community in Champaign County, in the U.S. state of Ohio.

== History ==
Powhattan was founded no later than the 1850s. The community was named after Chief Powhatan.
