= Northville, Ohio =

Unincorporated community in Ohio, U.S.

Coordinates: 40°10′55″N 83°48′44″W

Northville is an unincorporated community in Champaign County, in the U.S. state of Ohio.

== History ==
Northville was laid out and platted in 1832.
