= Grandview Heights Historic District =

Historic district in Florida, United States

- U.S. National Register of Historic Places
- U.S. Historic district
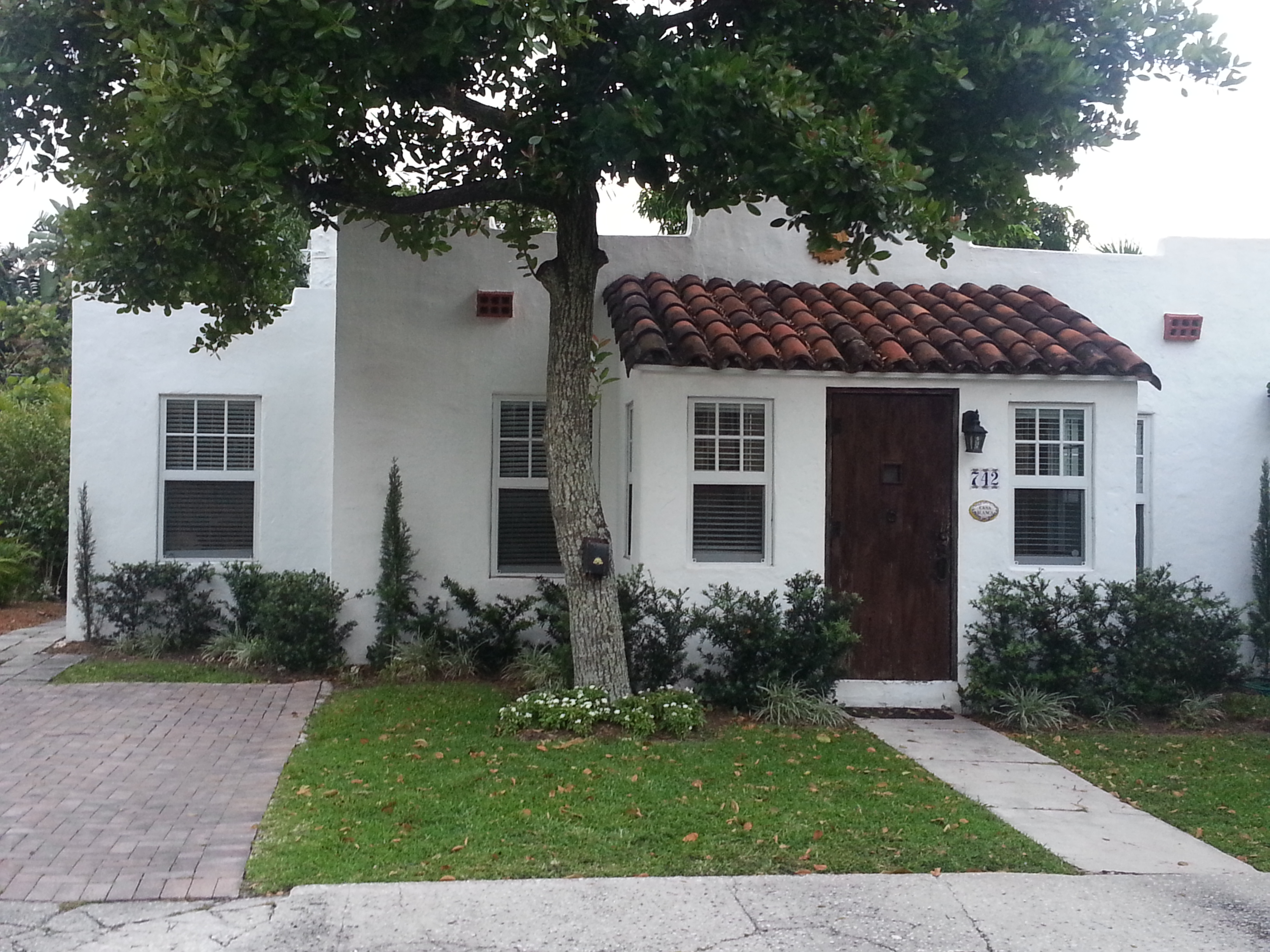

- Location within Florida Location within the United States
- Location: West Palm Beach, Florida
- Coordinates: 26°42′00″N 80°03′29″W
- Area: 230 acres (0.93 km^{2})
- Architectural style: Bungalow/Craftsman, Colonial Revival
- NRHP reference No.: 99000795
- Added to NRHP: July 8, 1999

The Grandview Heights Historic District (also known as Grandview Heights Neighborhood) is a U.S. historic district (designated as such on July 8, 1999) located in West Palm Beach, Florida. The district is bounded by Park Place, Alabama Avenue, M Street, and Lake Avenue.

One of the city's oldest neighborhoods still intact, Grandview Heights was built as an extension of Palm Beach Heights from around 1910 to 1925. The neighborhood has one of the city's best collection of early craftsman-style bungalows, as well as some modest, Mediterranean revival-style homes. Grandview Heights first residents were ministers, downtown shopkeepers, and the craftsmen who built the luxury hotels of Palm Beach. Despite having modest elevation, it contained the highest elevation to the south to Cuba, and at the time provided views of Lake Worth Lagoon over Woodlawn Cemetery and Pioneer Memorial Park. After a period of urban decline in the 1980s, almost all of Palm Beach Heights and portions of Grandview Heights were demolished in 1989 to make way for the proposed Downtown/Uptown urban revitalization project. This land, immediately north of the neighborhood, later became CityPlace, a New Urbanist mixed-use shopping and dining district.

Grandview Heights neighborhood has been restored to a mixed-use, walkable neighborhood with a mix of mostly single family homes, modern townhomes, and apartments. Also located in the neighborhood are two historic churches, several bed and breakfasts, and small local businesses.

The west end of the neighborhood is Howard Park, the largest urban park in West Palm Beach. Howard Park contains the historic Stub Canal Turning Basin, originally used for unloading crops grown to the west, including the central portions of the state near Lake Okeechobee, for shipment to the North. At the time, the land just across the canal from the park remained undeveloped marshlands, and was used for hunting. During the land-boom era, Howard Park was used as camp for settlers, including tent-sites, running water, and out-houses provided by the city. This camp was later converted to a Boy Scout camp, and is the location of the present-day dog park. Some tourists and settlers would alternatively rent apartments located over garages in the neighborhood, providing additional income to residents. The historic Art Deco style Armory building was built in 1939 with WPA funds for use by the National Guard. It currently houses the Armory Arts Center, which includes an art school and galleries.

Immediately east of the neighborhood is the historic Woodlawn Cemetery, the South Dixie shopping district, and the Norton Museum of Art.

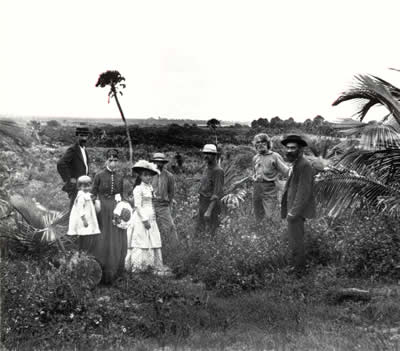
West Palm Beach in the 1880s

Historic Neighborhood sign

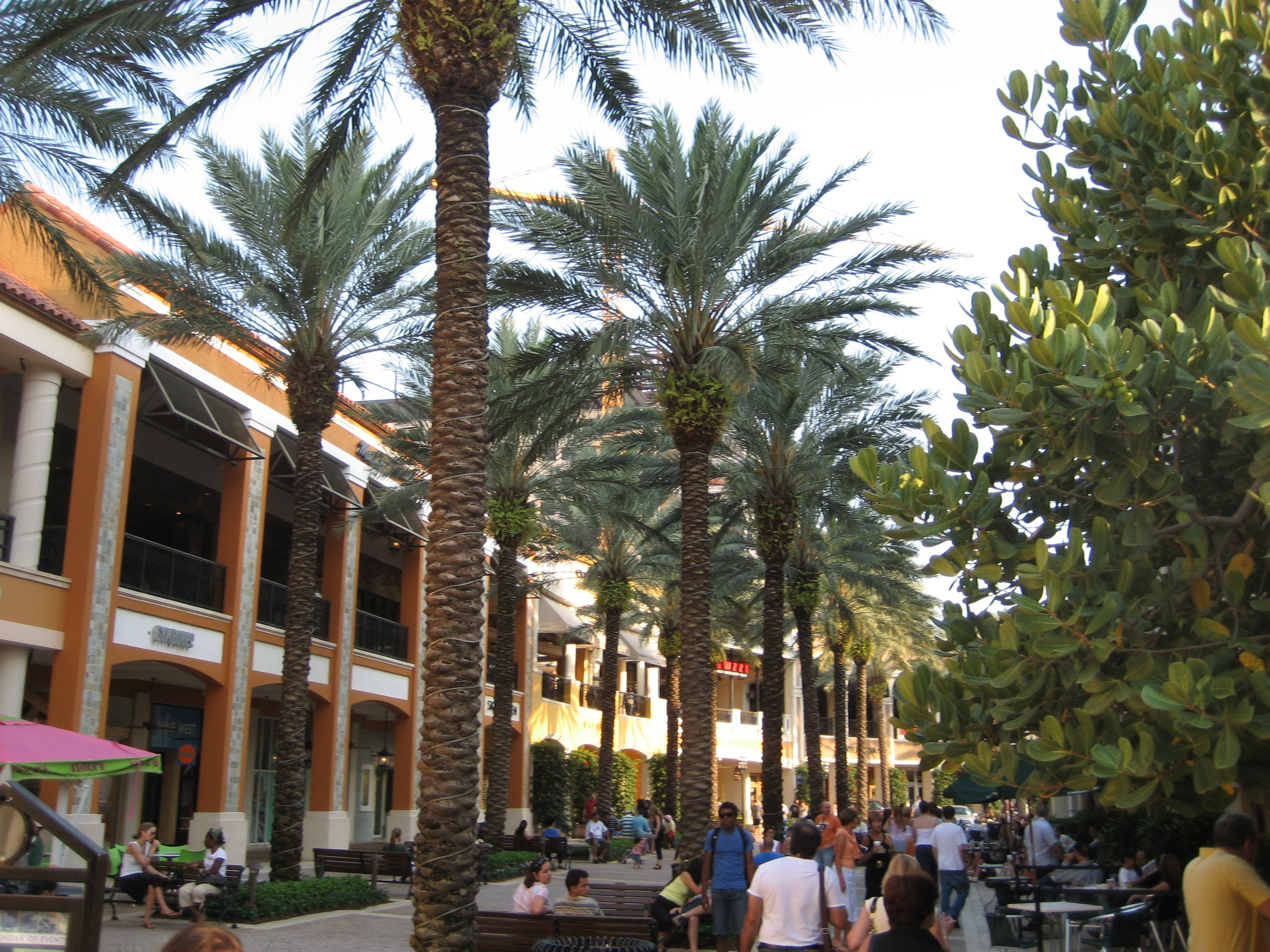
CityPlace district, a short walk from Grandview Heights

== Historic Buildings ==
The Grandview Heights Historic District contains 268 historic buildings.

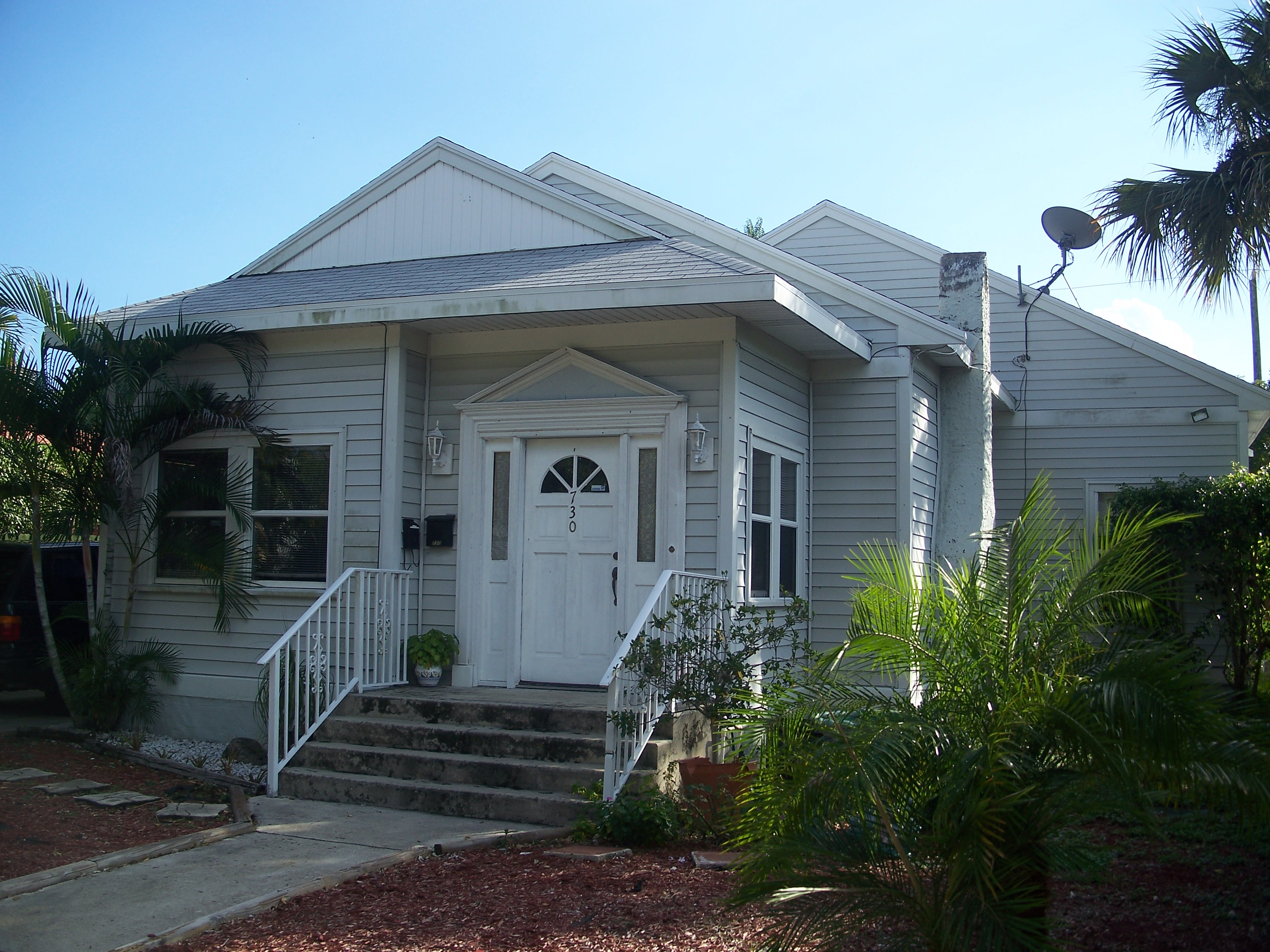
American Craftsman Bungalow

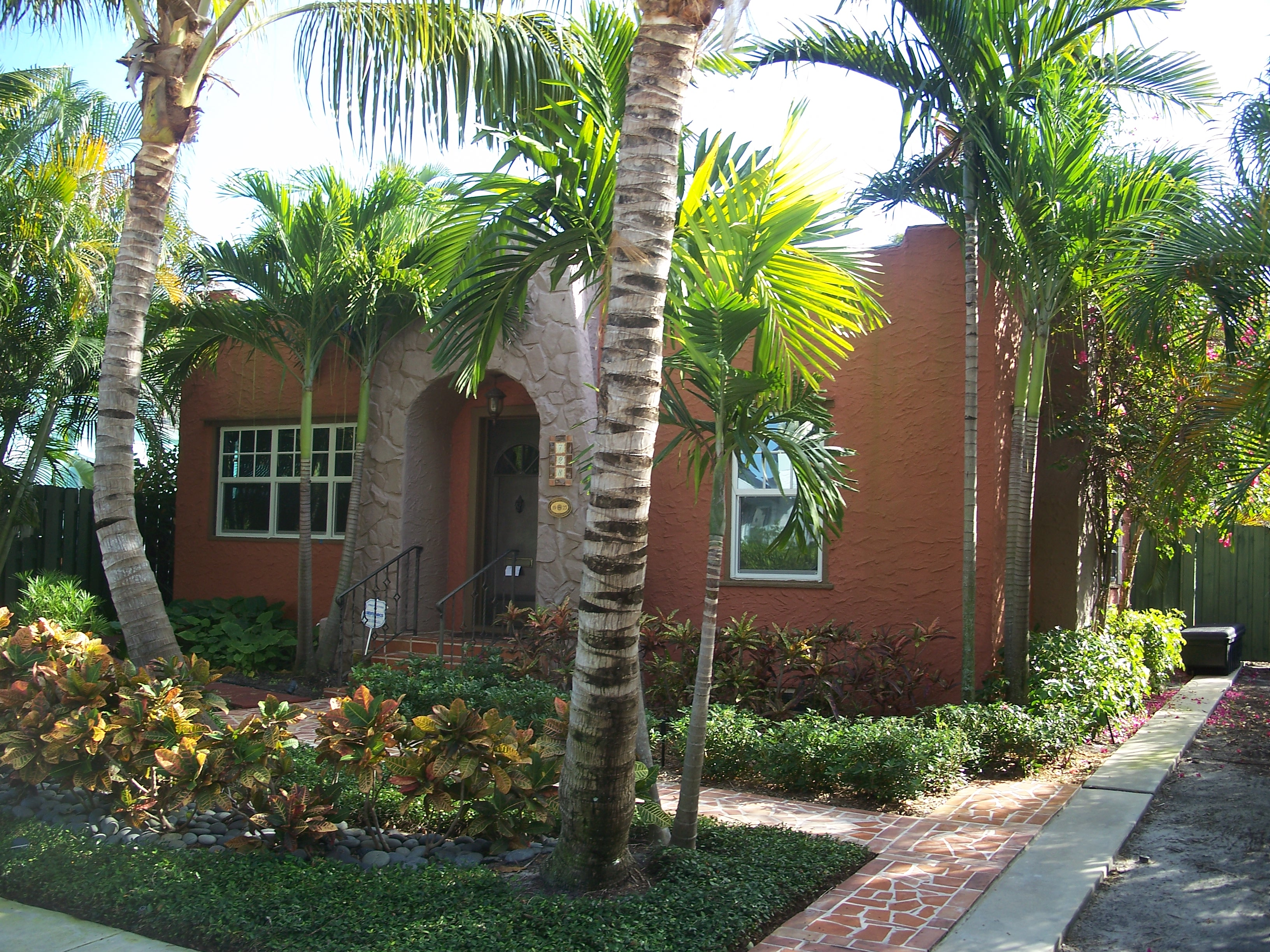
Spanish Colonial

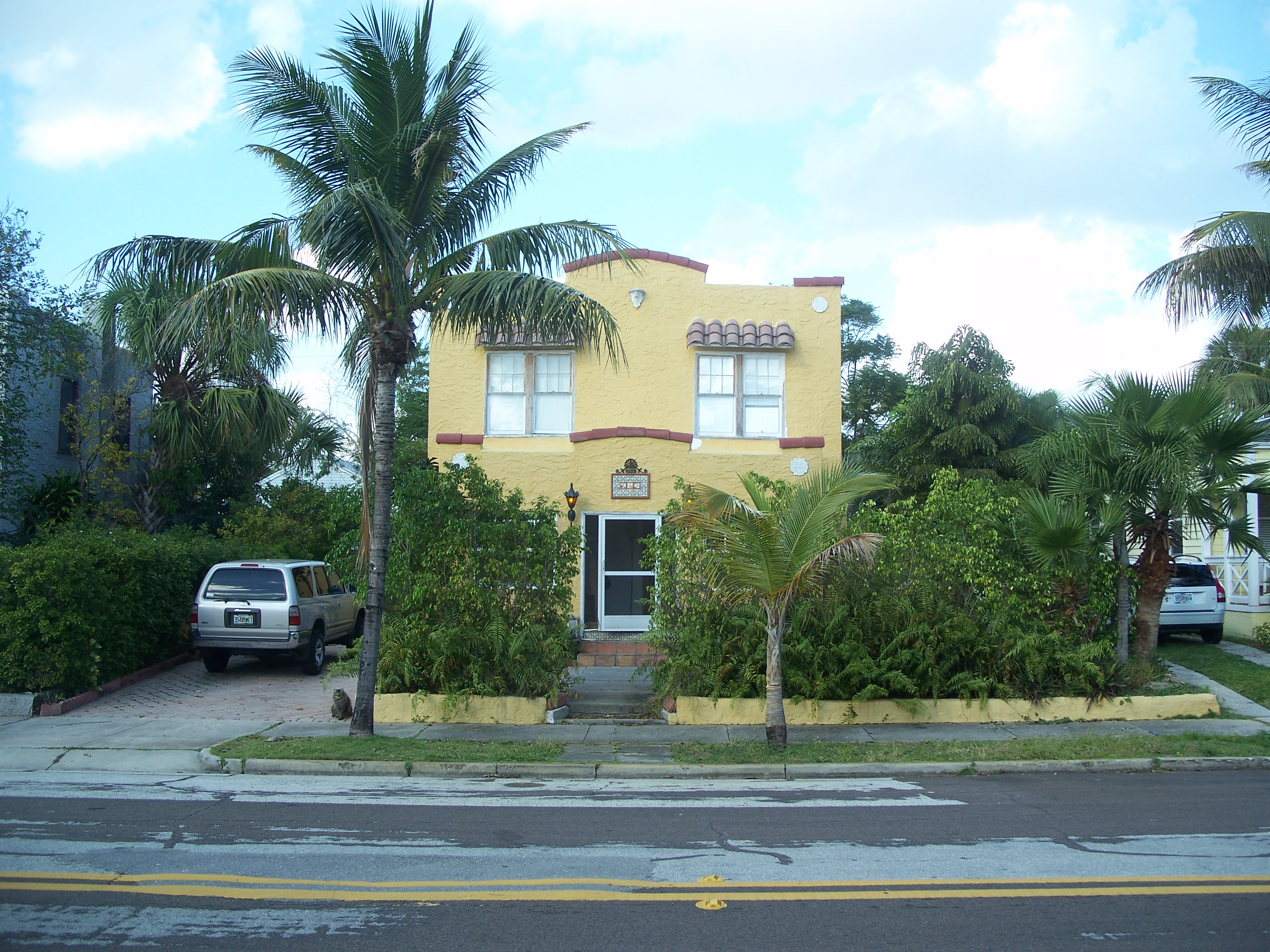
Mission Revival American Foursquare

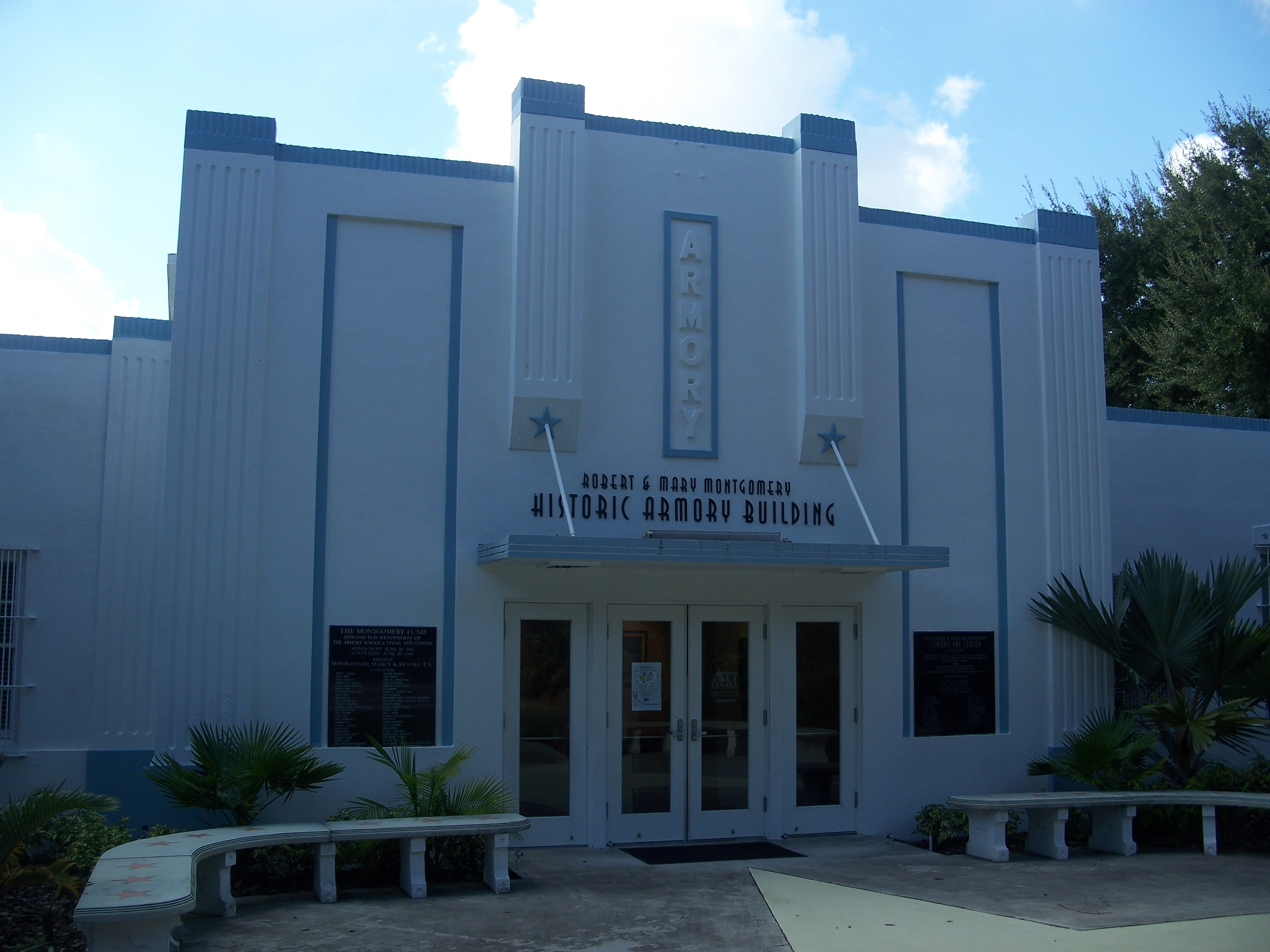
Armory Art Center

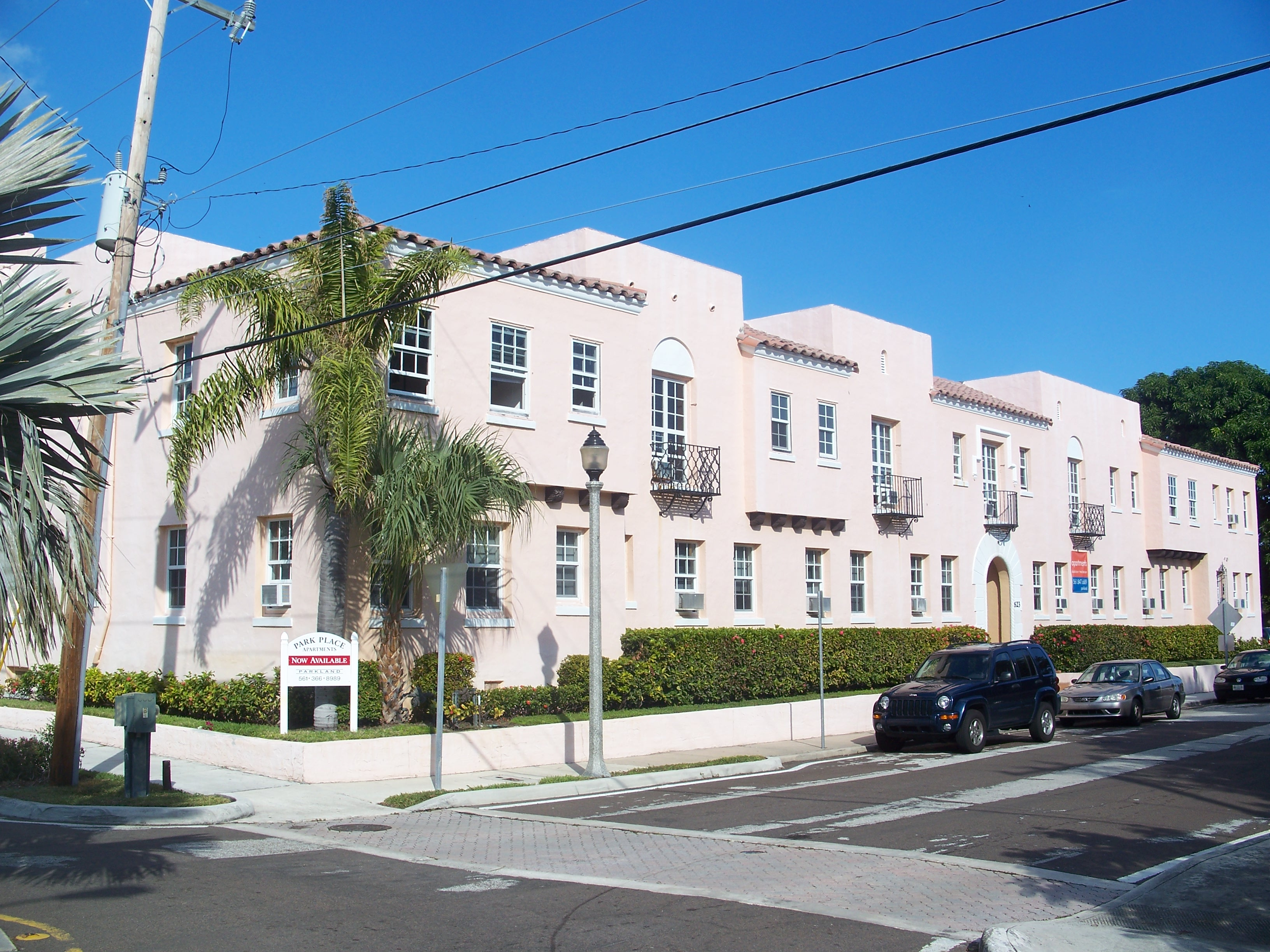
Historic Grandview Heights Apartments
