= USS Powhatan (1898) =

American steam tug

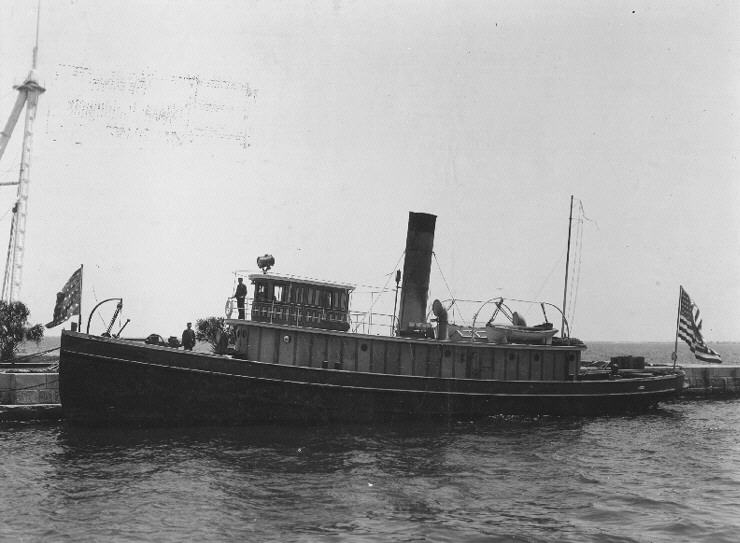

History

United States
- Name: USS Powhatan
- Namesake: Native American chief Powhatan
- Builder: Maryland Steel Company, Baltimore, Maryland
- Completed: 1892
- Acquired: 8 April 1898
- Commissioned: 20 April 1898
- Decommissioned: 20 April 1928
- Renamed: USS Cayuga 1 September 1917
- Fate: Sold for scrapping 5 June 1928
- Notes: Named Penwood prior to U.S. Navy service

General characteristics
- Type: Tug
- Displacement: 194 tons
- Length: 101 ft (31 m)
- Beam: 21 ft (6.4 m)
- Draft: 10 ft (3.0 m)
- Speed: 13 knots (24 km/h; 15 mph)
- Complement: 35
- Armament: 1 × 3-pounder gun; 1 × 1-pounder gun

The third USS Powhatan was a steam tug that served in the United States Navy from 1898 to 1928, was renamed USS Cayuga in 1917, and was later designated YT-12.

== Construction and career ==
Powhatan, formerly Penwood, was built in 1892 by the Maryland Steel Company, Baltimore, Maryland. She was purchased by the United States Navy on 8 April 1898 and commissioned on 20 April 1898. Powhatan was first attached to the Auxiliary Naval Force based at Pensacola, Florida, from 11 June 1898 to 8 August 1898. Later she was assigned to the Pensacola Navy Yard as yard tug. In 1900 Powhatan served the Marine Hospital Service, United States Department of the Treasury, as a quarantine vessel at Reedy Island, Delaware. She returned to the U.S. Navy in 1901 as yard tug at the New York Navy Yard

On 1 December 1906 she was involved in a minor collision with a float off Pier 4 in the North River, causing slight damage to her port side. On 11 June 1908 the barge Canister that she was towing had a minor collision with the ferry Long Beach off South Ferry in the East River. On 2 January 1909 she had a minor collision with tow steamer Hiawatha in the East River off Pier 7, Brooklyn doing $300 in damage to Hiawatha. Powhatan's captain was charged with violation of pilot rules and tried on 20 January.

On 1 September 1917 her name was changed to USS Cayuga. She was later given the alphanumeric hull number YT-12. Cayuga continued to be stationed at the New York Navy Yard until decommissioned on 20 April 1928. She was sold for scrapping on 5 June 1928.
