= Powhatan (given name) =

Powhatan is a masculine given name. The best-known bearer of the name is Powhatan (Native American leader) (1545–1618), leader of the Powhatan tribe and father of Pocahontas.

Others with the name include:

- Powhatan Beaty (1837–1916), African-American soldier and actor awarded the Medal of Honor
- Powhatan Henry Clarke (1862–1893), United States Army first lieutenant awarded the Medal of Honor
- Powhatan Ellis (1790–1863), American politician and judge, Senator from Mississippi
- Powhatan Gordon (1802–1879), American farmer and state senator
- Powhatan B. Locke (c. 1828–1868), justice of the Territorial Supreme Court of Nevada
