= Kiser Lake State Park =

Park in Ohio, USA

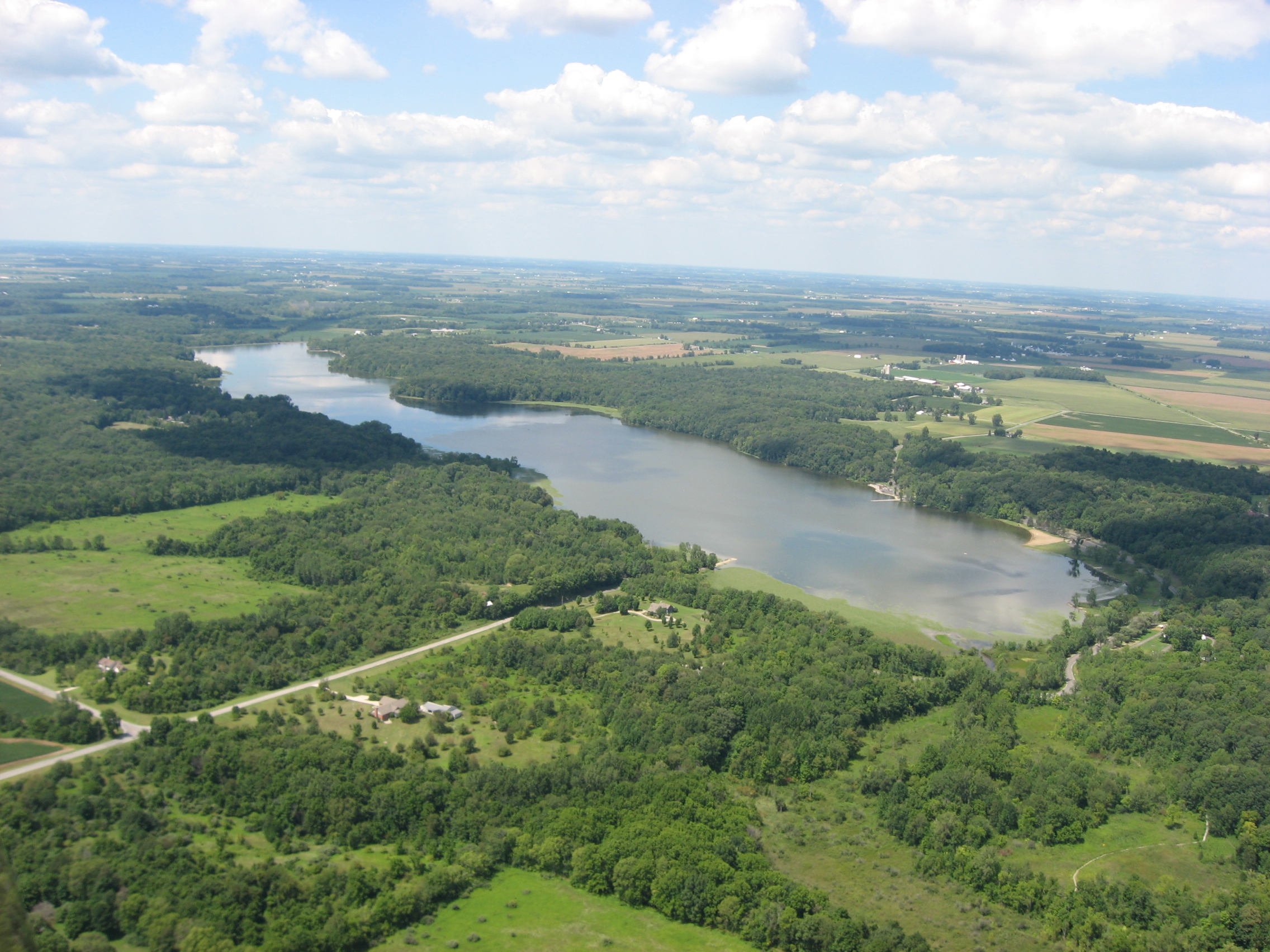
- Kiser Lake (and surrounding state park) viewed from the south

- Location within Ohio Location within the United States
- Location: Champaign County, Ohio, United States
- Nearest town: St. Paris, Ohio
- Coordinates: 40°11′28″N 83°58′00″W
- Area: Land: 531 acres (215 ha); Water: 396 acres (160 ha)
- Elevation: 1,093 feet (333 m)
- Established: 1940
- Administrator: Ohio Department of Natural Resources
- Designation: Ohio state park
- Website: Kiser Lake State Park

Kiser Lake State Park is a public recreation area in Champaign County, Ohio, located four miles (6.4 km) northwest of St. Paris and 34 miles (55 km) north of Dayton. The 531-acre (215 ha) state park includes 396-acre (160 ha) Kiser Lake, for which it was named, and the 51-acre (21 ha) Kiser Lake Wetlands State Nature Preserve.

== History ==
A dam was first built in this location in 1840 to power a mill, but it was later abandoned and the dam and lake fell into disrepair. In 1932, John W. Kiser donated the land to the State of Ohio to rebuild the lake for recreational purposes. In 1939, construction started on the new dam, and a year later the lake was filled.

== Activities ==
While it is well-known for its fishing, ODNR also maintains one boat ramp, four smaller launch areas, a marina to rent kayaks and canoes, a 300-foot (91 m) beach and swimming area, seasonal refreshment stand, picnic areas, shelter houses, campsites, cabins, six hiking trials, and ten miles (16 km) of bridle trails. Scuba diving and sailing are also viable activities at the park since no motorized boats are allowed on the lake.
