= Crayon, Ohio =

Unincorporated community in Ohio, U.S.

Coordinates: 40°12′01″N 83°53′42″W

Crayon is an unincorporated community in Champaign County, in the U.S. state of Ohio.

== History ==
A post office was established at Crayon in 1879, and remained in operation until 1905. Besides the post office, Crayon had a country store.
