= Mingo, Ohio =

Unincorporated community in Ohio, U.S.

Coordinates: 40°12′29″N 83°38′18″W

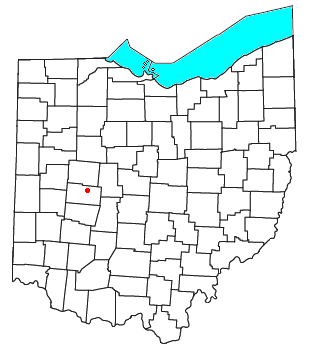
Location of Mingo, Ohio

Mingo is an unincorporated community in northern Wayne Township, Champaign County, Ohio, United States. It has the ZIP code 43047. It is located along State Route 245.

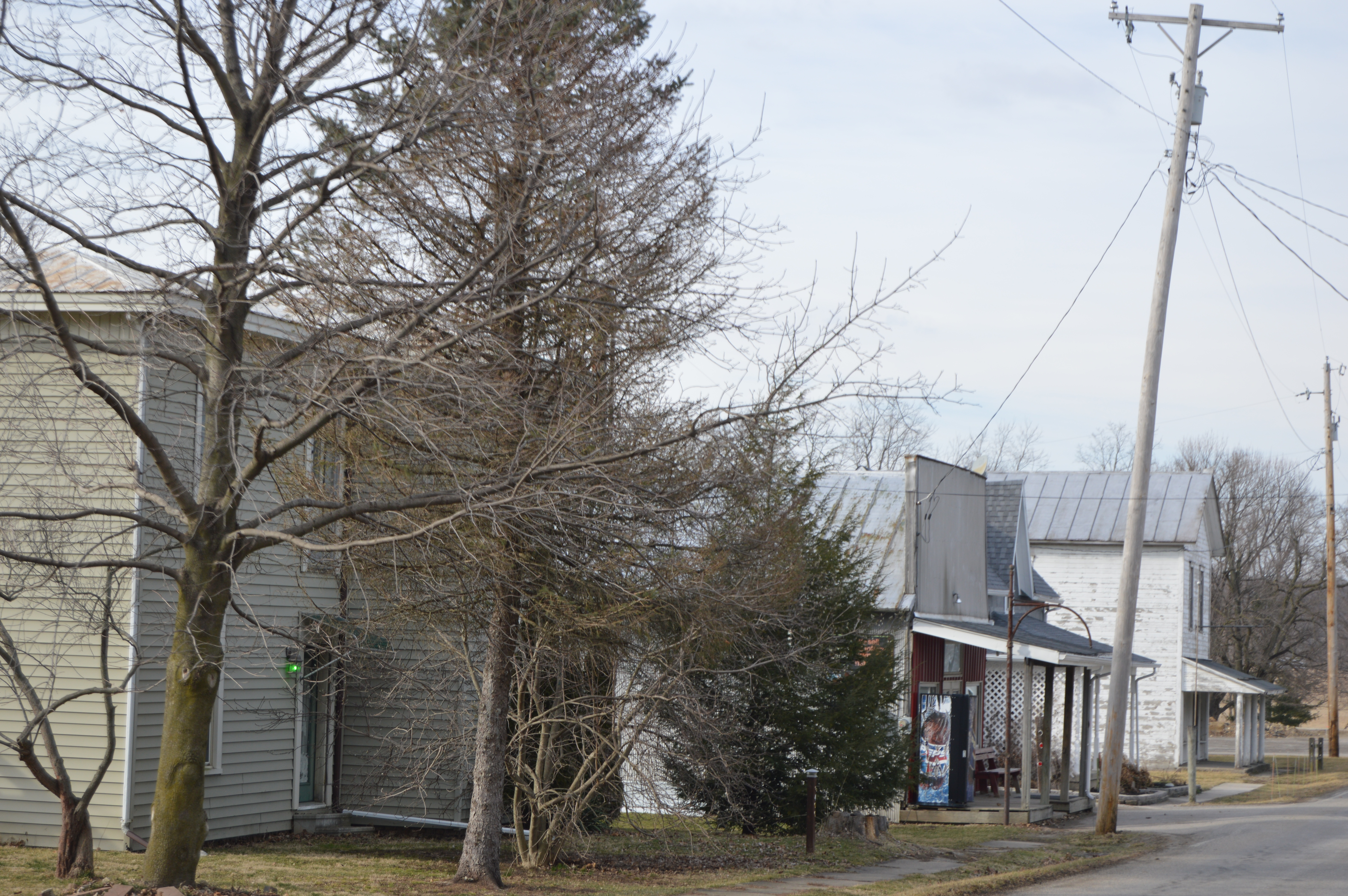
Buildings on Stevenson Road

Mingo was originally known as Mulberry, and under the latter name was platted in 1866. It was later renamed for the historic Iroquoian Mingo people.
