= Adams Township, Champaign County, Ohio =

Township in Ohio, US

- Township
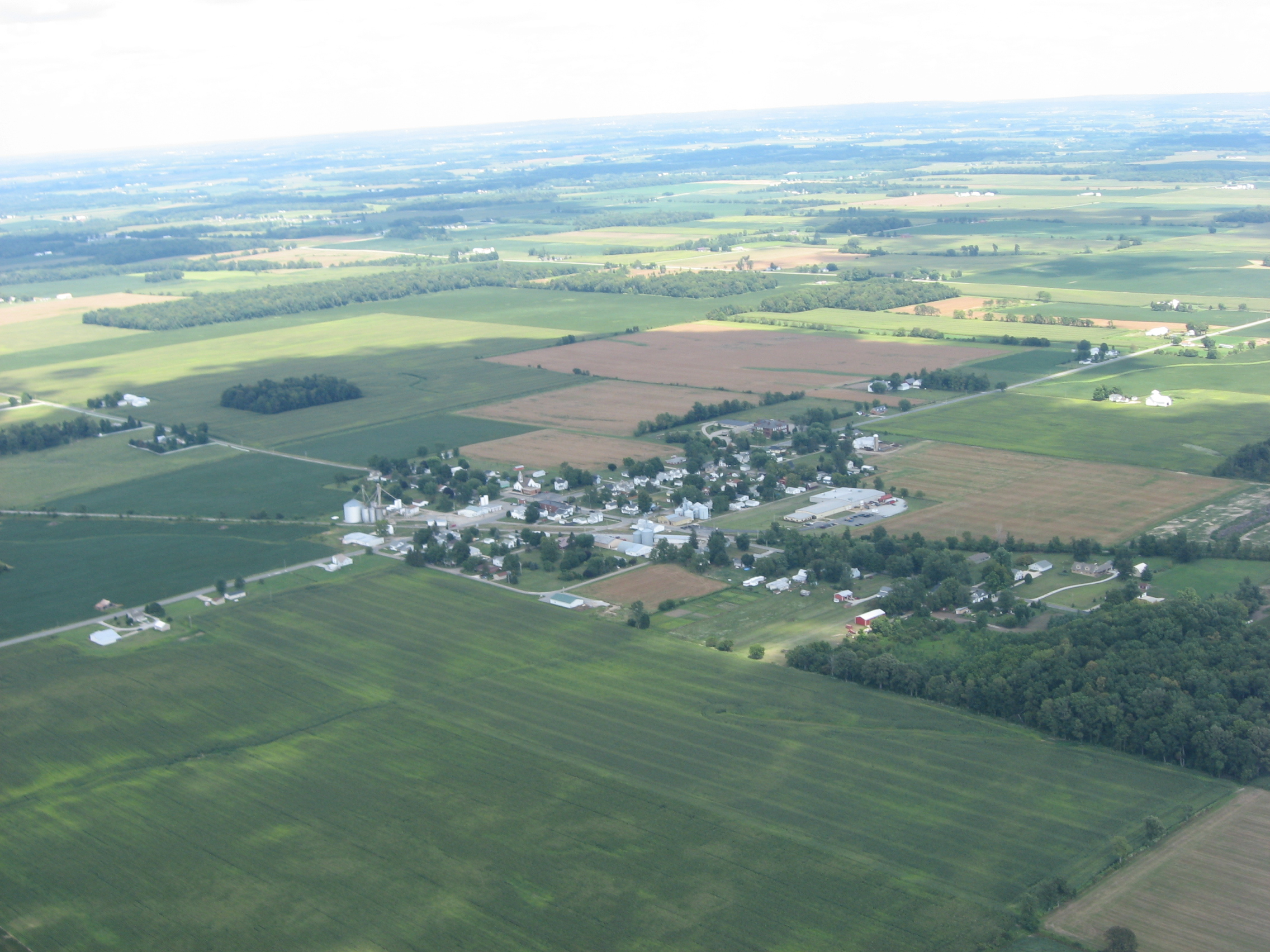
- Rosewood, a community in southern Adams Township

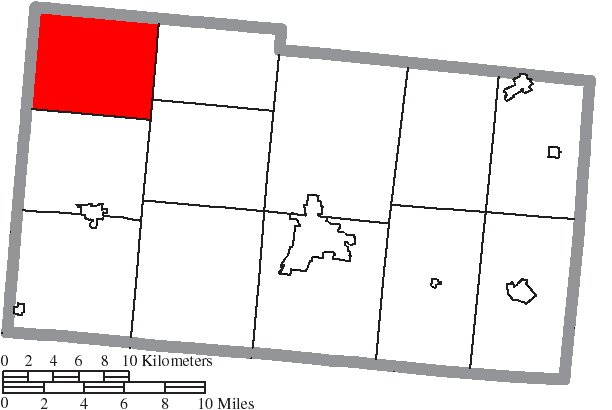
- Location of Adams Township in Champaign County
- Coordinates: 40°13′56″N 83°57′48″W
- Country: United States
- State: Ohio
- County: Champaign

Area
  - Total: 31.0 sq mi (80.4 km^{2})
  - Land: 31.0 sq mi (80.4 km^{2})
  - Water: 0 sq mi (0.0 km^{2})
- Elevation: 1,142 ft (348 m)

Population (2020)
  - Total: 1,036
  - Density: 36/sq mi (13.8/km^{2})
- Time zone: UTC-5 (Eastern (EST))
  - Summer (DST): UTC-4 (EDT)
- FIPS code: 39-00212
- GNIS feature ID: 1085838

Adams Township is one of the twelve townships of Champaign County, Ohio, United States. As of the 2020 census the population was 1,036.

== Geography ==
In the northwestern corner of the county, Adams Township borders the following townships:

- Miami Township, Logan County - north
- Harrison Township - east
- Concord Township - southeast
- Johnson Township - south
- Green Township, Shelby County - west
- Perry Township, Shelby County - northwest

No municipalities are in Adams Township, although the unincorporated community of Rosewood lies in the township's south.

== Name and history ==
Adams Township was organized in 1828. It was named for John Quincy Adams, sixth President of the United States. It is one of ten Adams Townships statewide.

== Government ==
The township is governed by a three-member board of trustees, who are elected in November of odd-numbered years to four-year terms that begin on the following January 1. Two are elected in the year after the presidential election and one is elected in the year before it. There is also an elected township clerk, who serves a four-year term beginning on April 1 of the year after the election, which is held in November of the year before the presidential election. Vacancies in the clerkship or on the board of trustees are filled by the remaining trustees.
