= Champaign County, Ohio =

County in Ohio, United States

- County
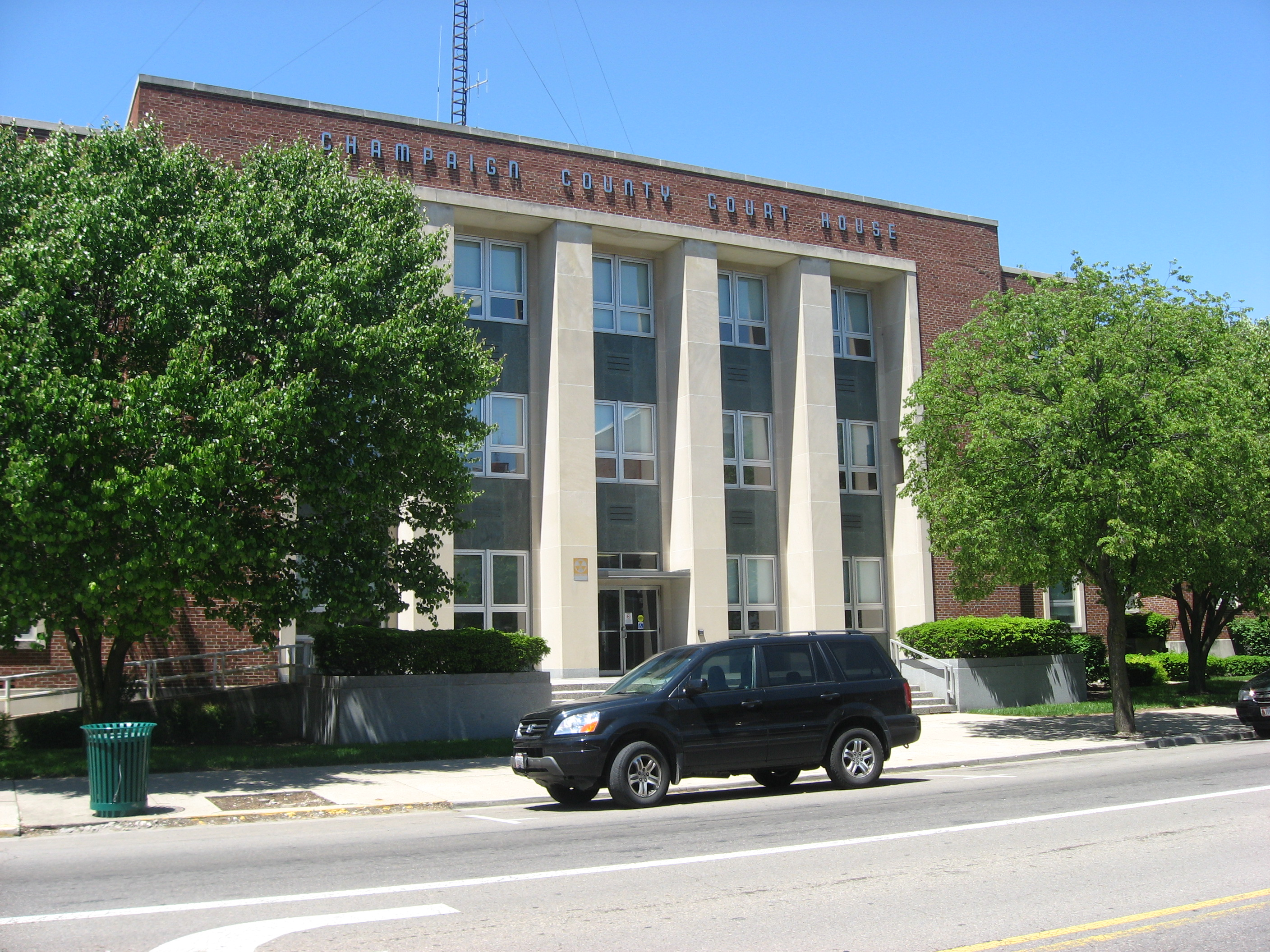
- Champaign County Courthouse in Urbana

- Flag Seal

- Location within the U.S. state of Ohio
- Coordinates: 40°08′N 83°46′W
- Country: United States
- State: Ohio
- Founded: March 1, 1805
- Named for: "plain" in French
- Seat: Urbana
- Largest city: Urbana

Area
  - Total: 430 sq mi (1,100 km^{2})
  - Land: 429 sq mi (1,110 km^{2})
  - Water: 1.2 sq mi (3.1 km^{2}) 0.3%

Population (2020)
  - Total: 38,714
  - Estimate (2025): 38,820 ▲
  - Density: 90.2/sq mi (34.8/km^{2})
- Time zone: UTC−5 (Eastern)
  - Summer (DST): UTC−4 (EDT)
- Congressional district: 4th
- Website: www.co.champaign.oh.us

Champaign County is a county located in the U.S. state of Ohio. As of the 2020 census, the population was 38,714. Its county seat and largest city is Urbana. The county takes its name from the French word for "open level country". Champaign County became the 18th of 88 Ohio counties on March 1, 1805. It was formed from parts of Greene and Franklin counties by legislative action. Champaign County comprises the Urbana, OH Micropolitan Statistical Area, which is also included in the Dayton–Springfield–Sidney, OH Combined Statistical Area.

== Geography ==
According to the U.S. Census Bureau, the county has a total area of 430 square miles (1,100 km^{2}), of which 429 square miles (1,110 km^{2}) is land and 1.2 square miles (3.1 km^{2}) (0.3%) is water.

=== Adjacent counties ===
- Logan County (north)
- Union County (northeast)
- Madison County (southeast)
- Clark County (south)
- Miami County (southwest)
- Shelby County (northwest)

== Demographics ==
Historical population
Census	Pop.	Note	%±
1810	6,303		—
1820	8,479		34.5%
1830	12,131		43.1%
1840	16,721		37.8%
1850	19,782		18.3%
1860	22,698		14.7%
1870	24,188		6.6%
1880	27,817		15.0%
1890	26,980		−3.0%
1900	26,642		−1.3%
1910	26,351		−1.1%
1920	25,071		−4.9%
1930	24,103		−3.9%
1940	25,258		4.8%
1950	26,793		6.1%
1960	29,714		10.9%
1970	30,491		2.6%
1980	33,649		10.4%
1990	36,019		7.0%
2000	38,890		8.0%
2010	40,097		3.1%
2020	38,714		−3.4%
2025 (est.)	38,820	▲	0.3%
U.S. Decennial Census; 1790-1960 1900-1990; 1990-2000 2020

=== Racial and ethnic composition ===
Champaign County, Ohio – racial and ethnic composition Note: the US Census treats Hispanic/Latino as an ethnic category. This table excludes Latinos from the racial categories and assigns them to a separate category. Hispanics/Latinos may be of any race.
Race / ethnicity (NH = Non-Hispanic)	Pop 1980	Pop 1990	Pop 2000	Pop 2010	Pop 2020	% 1980	% 1990	% 2000	% 2010	% 2020
White alone (NH)	32,315	34,564	37,079	37,743	35,314	96.04%	95.96%	95.34%	94.13%	91.22%
Black or African American alone (NH)	974	986	891	874	683	2.89%	2.74%	2.29%	2.18%	1.76%
Native American or Alaska Native alone (NH)	26	68	113	134	79	0.08%	0.19%	0.29%	0.33%	0.20%
Asian alone (NH)	65	111	99	151	125	0.19%	0.31%	0.25%	0.38%	0.32%
Native Hawaiian or Pacific Islander alone (NH)	x	x	5	12	7	x	x	0.01%	0.03%	0.02%
Other race alone (NH)	31	44	39	32	139	0.09%	0.12%	0.10%	0.08%	0.36%
Mixed-race or multiracial (NH)	x	x	395	700	1,719	x	x	1.02%	1.75%	4.44%
Hispanic or Latino (any race)	238	246	269	451	648	0.71%	0.68%	0.69%	1.12%	1.67%
Total	33,649	36,019	38,890	40,097	38,714	100.00%	100.00%	100.00%	100.00%	100.00%

=== 2020 census ===
As of the 2020 census, the county had a population of 38,714. The median age was 42.6 years, 22.8% of residents were under the age of 18, and 19.3% were 65 years of age or older. For every 100 females there were 98.7 males, and for every 100 females age 18 and over there were 96.6 males age 18 and over.

The racial makeup of the county was 92.0% White, 1.8% Black or African American, 0.2% American Indian and Alaska Native, 0.3% Asian, <0.1% Native Hawaiian and Pacific Islander, 0.6% from some other race, and 5.0% from two or more races. Hispanic or Latino residents of any race comprised 1.7% of the population.

29.4% of residents lived in urban areas, while 70.6% lived in rural areas.

There were 15,638 households in the county, of which 28.9% had children under the age of 18 living in them. Of all households, 50.6% were married-couple households, 18.2% were households with a male householder and no spouse or partner present, and 23.5% were households with a female householder and no spouse or partner present. About 27.3% of all households were made up of individuals and 12.7% had someone living alone who was 65 years of age or older.

There were 16,862 housing units, of which 7.3% were vacant. Among occupied housing units, 74.7% were owner-occupied and 25.3% were renter-occupied. The homeowner vacancy rate was 1.4% and the rental vacancy rate was 6.5%.

=== 2010 census ===
As of the 2010 United States census, there were 40,097 people, 15,329 households, and 10,925 families living in the county. The population density was 93.5 inhabitants per square mile (36.1/km^{2}). There were 16,755 housing units at an average density of 39.1 units per square mile (15.1 units/km^{2}). The racial makeup of the county was 94.7% white, 2.2% black or African American, 0.4% Asian, 0.4% American Indian, 0.4% from other races, and 1.9% from two or more races. Those of Hispanic or Latino origin made up 1.1% of the population. In terms of ancestry, 27.6% were German, 14.9% were Irish, 14.3% were American, and 11.8% were English.

Of the 15,329 households, 33.7% had children under the age of 18 living with them, 55.9% were married couples living together, 10.2% had a female householder with no husband present, 28.7% were non-families, and 23.9% of all households were made up of individuals. The average household size was 2.56 and the average family size was 3.02. The median age was 39.7 years.

The median income for a household in the county was $49,246 and the median income for a family was $58,433. Males had a median income of $44,920 versus $32,847 for females. The per capita income for the county was $23,438. About 10.0% of families and 12.9% of the population were below the poverty line, including 18.4% of those under age 18 and 6.3% of those age 65 or over.

=== 2000 census ===
As of the census of 2000, there were 38,890 people, 14,952 households, and 10,870 families living in the county. The population density was 91 inhabitants per square mile (35/km^{2}). There were 15,890 housing units at an average density of 37 units per square mile (14/km^{2}). The racial makeup of the county was 95.73% White, 2.30% Black or African American, 0.31% Native American, 0.25% Asian, 0.02% Pacific Islander, 0.31% from other races, and 1.08% from two or more races. 0.69% of the population were Hispanic or Latino of any race.

There were 14,952 households, out of which 34.00% had children under the age of 18 living with them, 59.70% were married couples living together, 9.20% had a female householder with no husband present, and 27.30% were non-families. 23.50% of all households were made up of individuals, and 9.40% had someone living alone who was 65 years of age or older. The average household size was 2.56 and the average family size was 3.01.

In the county, the population was spread out, with 26.20% under the age of 18, 7.90% from 18 to 24, 28.70% from 25 to 44, 24.60% from 45 to 64, and 12.60% who were 65 years of age or older. The median age was 37 years. For every 100 females, there were 95.90 males. For every 100 females age 18 and over, there were 92.90 males.

The median income for a household in the county was $43,139, and the median income for a family was $50,430. Males had a median income of $38,265 versus $26,241 for females. The per capita income for the county was $19,542. About 5.10% of families and 7.60% of the population were below the poverty line, including 9.90% of those under age 18 and 7.60% of those age 65 or over.

== Politics ==
Champaign County is a Republican stronghold county in presidential elections. It has only voted Democratic three times since 1856.

United States presidential election results for Champaign County, Ohio
Year	Republican		Democratic		Third party(ies)	
Year	No.	%	No.	%	No.	%
1856	1,995	49.55%	1,711	42.50%	320	7.95%
1860	2,325	52.12%	1,810	40.57%	326	7.31%
1864	2,766	61.06%	1,764	38.94%	0	0.00%
1868	2,954	58.01%	2,138	41.99%	0	0.00%
1872	3,059	58.08%	2,185	41.48%	23	0.44%
1876	3,528	54.99%	2,872	44.76%	16	0.25%
1880	4,100	58.38%	2,865	40.79%	58	0.83%
1884	4,157	56.41%	3,078	41.77%	134	1.82%
1888	3,933	53.58%	3,049	41.53%	359	4.89%
1892	3,708	53.97%	2,791	40.62%	372	5.41%
1896	4,314	55.13%	3,432	43.86%	79	1.01%
1900	4,306	56.32%	3,192	41.75%	148	1.94%
1904	4,192	61.98%	2,336	34.54%	235	3.47%
1908	4,153	55.69%	3,160	42.38%	144	1.93%
1912	2,392	35.08%	2,763	40.53%	1,663	24.39%
1916	3,695	51.80%	3,338	46.80%	100	1.40%
1920	7,285	60.07%	4,775	39.37%	68	0.56%
1924	6,181	60.33%	3,575	34.90%	489	4.77%
1928	7,651	69.52%	3,296	29.95%	59	0.54%
1932	6,191	48.70%	6,396	50.31%	125	0.98%
1936	6,872	50.09%	6,485	47.27%	362	2.64%
1940	7,841	56.94%	5,929	43.06%	0	0.00%
1944	7,795	61.89%	4,800	38.11%	0	0.00%
1948	6,492	58.49%	4,585	41.31%	23	0.21%
1952	8,880	66.06%	4,563	33.94%	0	0.00%
1956	8,767	69.48%	3,851	30.52%	0	0.00%
1960	9,141	66.72%	4,560	33.28%	0	0.00%
1964	5,588	43.91%	7,138	56.09%	0	0.00%
1968	6,863	53.83%	4,264	33.44%	1,623	12.73%
1972	8,756	69.48%	3,626	28.77%	221	1.75%
1976	6,526	56.74%	4,748	41.28%	228	1.98%
1980	7,356	60.17%	4,109	33.61%	760	6.22%
1984	9,935	73.05%	3,544	26.06%	121	0.89%
1988	8,995	67.29%	4,272	31.96%	101	0.76%
1992	7,004	43.10%	5,201	32.00%	4,047	24.90%
1996	6,568	44.10%	5,990	40.22%	2,335	15.68%
2000	9,220	58.80%	5,955	37.98%	505	3.22%
2004	11,718	62.41%	6,968	37.11%	90	0.48%
2008	11,141	58.84%	7,385	39.00%	410	2.17%
2012	11,045	59.81%	7,044	38.14%	379	2.05%
2016	12,631	69.24%	4,594	25.18%	1,018	5.58%
2020	14,589	72.93%	5,062	25.31%	352	1.76%
2024	15,334	74.57%	4,944	24.04%	286	1.39%

United States Senate election results for Champaign County, Ohio1
Year	Republican		Democratic		Third party(ies)	
Year	No.	%	No.	%	No.	%
2024	13,917	68.68%	5,547	27.37%	801	3.95%

== Communities ==
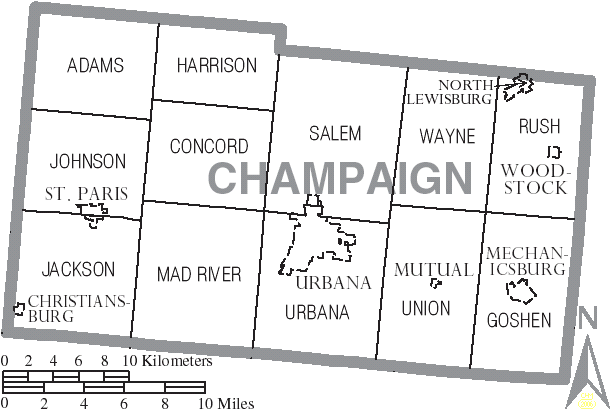
Map of Champaign County, with municipal and township labels

=== City ===
- Urbana (county seat)

=== Villages ===
- Christiansburg
- Mechanicsburg
- Mutual
- North Lewisburg
- St. Paris
- Woodstock

=== Townships ===
- Adams
- Concord
- Goshen
- Harrison
- Jackson
- Johnson
- Mad River
- Rush
- Salem
- Union
- Urbana
- Wayne

=== Census-designated place ===
- Rosewood

=== Unincorporated communities ===
- Bowlusville
- Cable
- Carysville
- Catawba Station
- Crayon
- Darnell
- Eris
- Five Points
- Fountain Park
- Grandview Heights
- Kennard
- Kingscreek
- Lippincott
- Middletown
- Millerstown
- Mingo
- Northville
- Powhattan
- Springhills
- Terre Haute
- Thackery
- Westville

== Education ==
School districts include:

- Graham Local School District
- Mechanicsburg Exempted Village School District
- Miami East Local School District
- Northeastern Local School District
- Northwestern Local School District
- Triad Local School District
- Urbana City School District
- West Liberty-Salem Local School District

== Libraries ==
The following libraries serve the communities of Champaign County.

- Champaign County Library in Urbana, Ohio and North Lewisburg, Ohio
- Mechanicsburg Public Library in Mechanicsburg, Ohio
- St. Paris Public Library in St. Paris, Ohio and Christiansburg, Ohio

== Notable people ==
- Lawrence Borst, veterinarian and Indiana state legislator
- John Isaiah Caldwell, lawyer
- Jim Jordan, U.S. representative for Ohio's 4th congressional district
- Michael Kent, comedian and magician
- Beth Macy, journalist and non-fiction writer
- Matt Rife, comedian
- David Taylor, Olympic gold medalist wrestler

== See also ==
- Kiser Lake State Park – Park in Ohio, USA
- National Register of Historic Places listings in Champaign County, Ohio
