= St. Paris, Ohio =

- Village
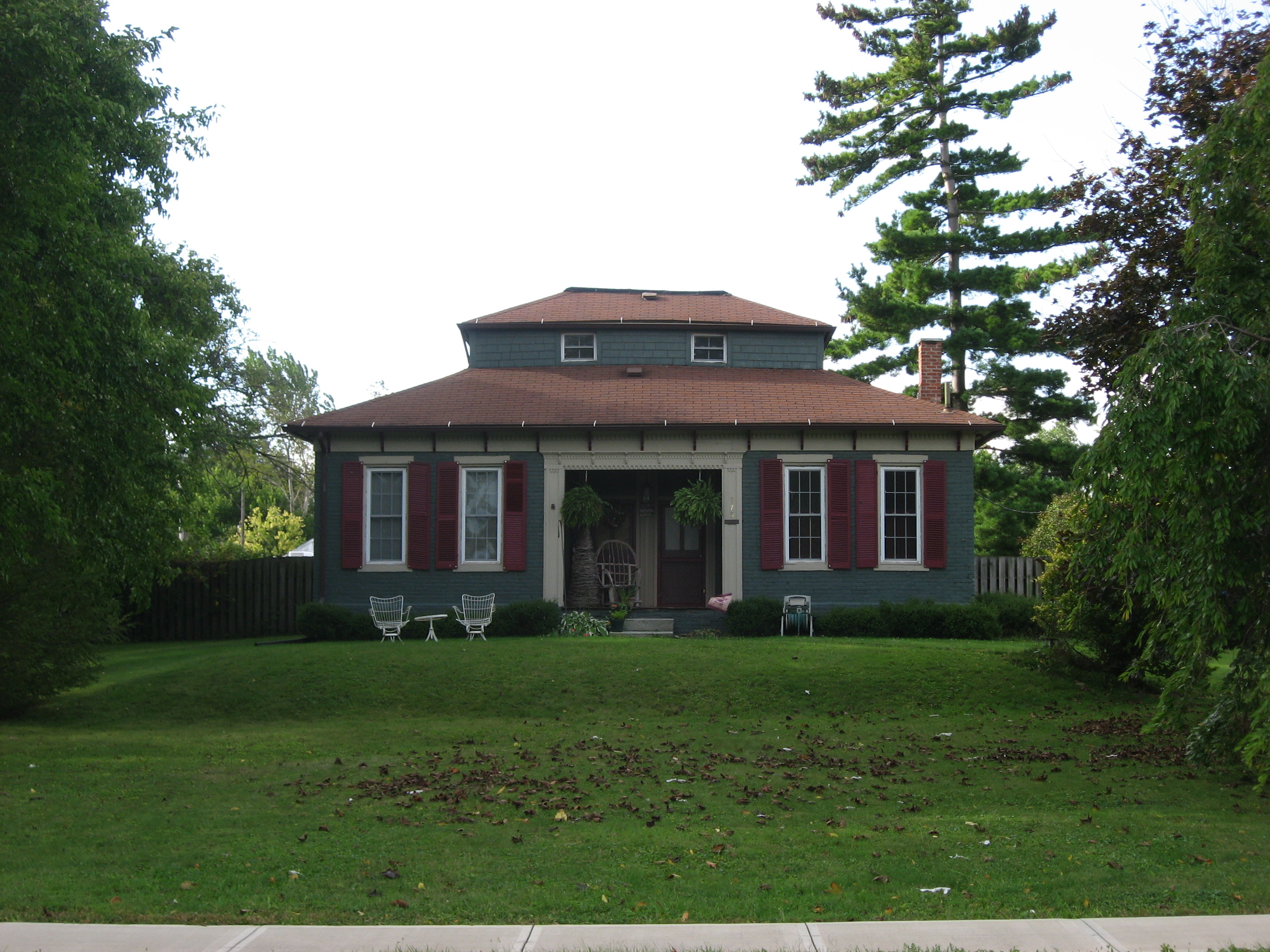
- The Monitor House, a historic site in the village

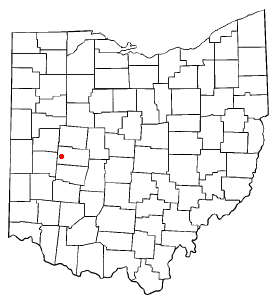
- Location of St. Paris, Ohio

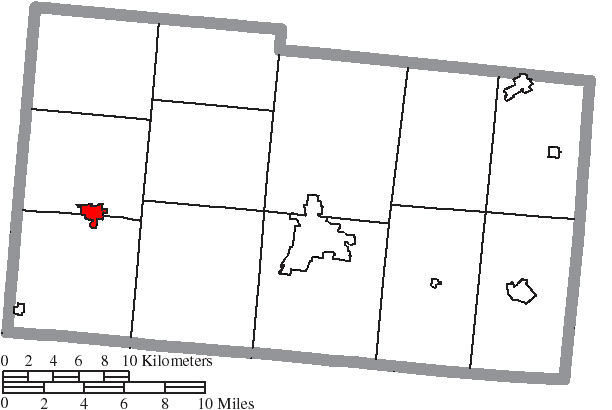
- Location of St. Paris in Champaign County
- Coordinates: 40°07′29″N 83°57′52″W
- Country: United States
- State: Ohio
- County: Champaign

Government
  - Mayor: Susan Prince

Area
  - Total: 1.62 sq mi (4.20 km^{2})
  - Land: 1.62 sq mi (4.20 km^{2})
  - Water: 0 sq mi (0.00 km^{2})
- Elevation: 1,217 ft (371 m)

Population (2020)
  - Total: 1,882
  - Density: 1,162/sq mi (448.5/km^{2})
- Time zone: UTC-5 (Eastern (EST))
  - Summer (DST): UTC-4 (EDT)
- ZIP code: 43072
- Area codes: 937, 326
- FIPS code: 39-69708
- GNIS feature ID: 2399170
- Website: Village website

St. Paris or Saint Paris is a village in Champaign County, Ohio, United States. The population was 1,882 at the 2020 census.

== History ==
The area where St. Paris now stands was originally inhabited by Native Americans. The first white settlers arrived in 1797 and the village was founded in Johnson Township in 1831 by David Huffman, who originally named it New Paris, after the French capital city of Paris. "On learning of a “New Paris” in this State, he prefixed to it the Saint, to avoid any difficulty that might occur in mail matter."

In 1846 and 1847 the Columbus and Piqua Railroad was built along the southern boundary of the village, greatly increasing its advantages compared to other communities in the surrounding area. After reorganization, when the Columbus, Piqua and Indiana Railroad between Columbus, Ohio, and Union City, Indiana opened on March 25, 1859, the local station was the most efficient transport option for area agricultural products and travellers. The railroad operated as part of the Bee Line, eventually becoming part of the Pennsylvania Railroad and then Conrail before abandonment in 1983.

St. Paris was incorporated as a village in 1858. The village increased in area, and now straddles to boundary between Johnson Township and Jackson Township.

One of the houses in the village, known as the "Monitor House", has been declared a historic site and is listed on the National Register of Historic Places.

== Geography ==
According to the United States Census Bureau, the village has a total area of 1.68 square miles (4.35 km^{2}), all of it land.

Kiser Lake and the Kiser Lake State Park are located about 4 miles (6.4 km) north of St. Paris.

== Demographics ==
Historical population
Census	Pop.	Note	%±
1880	1,099		—
1890	1,145		4.2%
1900	1,222		6.7%
1910	1,261		3.2%
1920	1,226		−2.8%
1930	1,177		−4.0%
1940	1,308		11.1%
1950	1,422		8.7%
1960	1,460		2.7%
1970	1,646		12.7%
1980	1,742		5.8%
1990	1,842		5.7%
2000	1,998		8.5%
2010	2,089		4.6%
2020	1,882		−9.9%
U.S. Decennial Census

=== 2010 census ===
As of the census of 2010, there were 2,089 people, 795 households, and 549 families living in the village. The population density was 1,243.5 inhabitants per square mile (480.1/km^{2}). There were 857 housing units at an average density of 510.1 per square mile (197.0/km^{2}). The racial makeup of the village was 97.8% White, 0.2% African American, 0.1% Native American, 0.2% Pacific Islander, 0.1% from other races, and 1.4% from two or more races. Hispanic or Latino of any race were 0.5% of the population.

There were 795 households, of which 39.7% had children under the age of 18 living with them, 49.8% were married couples living together, 13.8% had a female householder with no husband present, 5.4% had a male householder with no wife present, and 30.9% were non-families. 27.3% of all households were made up of individuals, and 12.6% had someone living alone who was 65 years of age or older. The average household size was 2.63 and the average family size was 3.16.

The median age in the village was 33.7 years. 31.2% of residents were under the age of 18; 7.2% were between the ages of 18 and 24; 26.6% were from 25 to 44; 22.7% were from 45 to 64; and 12.3% were 65 years of age or older. The gender makeup of the village was 47.8% male and 52.2% female.

=== 2000 census ===
As of the census of 2000, there were 1,998 people, 781 households, and 556 families living in the village. The population density was 2,302.5 inhabitants per square mile (889.0/km^{2}). There were 809 housing units at an average density of 932.3 per square mile (360.0/km^{2}). The racial makeup of the village was 98.55% White, 0.10% African American, 0.60% Native American, 0.15% from other races, and 0.60% from two or more races. Hispanic or Latino of any race were 0.65% of the population.

There were 781 households, out of which 38.0% had children under the age of 18 living with them, 55.8% were married couples living together, 11.4% had a female householder with no husband present, and 28.8% were non-families. 25.9% of all households were made up of individuals, and 11.4% had someone living alone who was 65 years of age or older. The average household size was 2.56 and the average family size was 3.07.

In the village, the population was spread out, with 29.1% under the age of 18, 9.6% from 18 to 24, 29.6% from 25 to 44, 20.2% from 45 to 64, and 11.6% who were 65 years of age or older. The median age was 33 years. For every 100 females there were 87.1 males. For every 100 females age 18 and over, there were 82.8 males.

The median income for a household in the village was $39,917, and the median income for a family was $47,014. Males had a median income of $35,417 versus $22,326 for females. The per capita income for the village was $16,811. About 8.8% of families and 8.8% of the population were below the poverty line, including 10.8% of those under age 18 and 9.1% of those age 65 or over.

== Education ==
St. Paris is served by Graham Local School District. Graham High School, a member of the Central Buckeye Conference, is located in St. Paris. There are also Graham Middle School and Graham Elementary School, both of which are newly built. The Board of Education offices were once located in the old Junior High School downtown, but have now been moved to a new location behind the high school. The Graham Digital Academy (GDA) and A. B. Graham Academy (ABGA) were also located in the building, until A. B. Graham Academy's closure in June 2014. All of these facilities are located on U.S. Route 36.

== Government ==
As of March 2024, the mayor of St. Paris is Susan Prince. The members of the village council are Tony Hoyt, Frank Blair, Terry Ervin II, Steve Lett, and Joe Curran.
