= Tecumseh High School (New Carlisle, Ohio) =

Public, coeducational high school in New Carlisle, Ohio, United States

Location
- 9830 West National Road; New Carlisle, (Clark County), Ohio 45344; United States; 39.9149°N 83.9965°W

Information
- Type: Public, Coeducational high school
- Established: March 1, 1952
- School district: Tecumseh Local Schools
- Superintendent: Paula Crew
- Principal: Aaron Oakes
- Teaching staff: 41.00 (FTE)
- Grades: 9-12
- Student to teacher ratio: 17.29
- Colors: Red and Black
- Song: Hail Tecumseh High
- Fight song: On Arrows! (Same tune as the University of Iowa's fight song On Iowa but with different lyrics)
- Athletics conference: Central Buckeye Conference
- Team name: Arrows
- Yearbook: The Trail
- Website: www.tecumseh.k12.oh.us/ths-home

Tecumseh High School is a public high school near New Carlisle, Ohio. The school and district are named in honor of Tecumseh, a chief of the Shawnee people who lived in the general area between approximately 1768 and 1813.

== Area served ==
Tecumseh is the only high school in the Tecumseh Local Schools district (renamed from New Carlisle–Bethel Local Schools in 1989). The district encompasses all but the northeast corner of Bethel Township of Clark County, plus the southwestern corner of Pike Township of Clark County and part of the eastern side of Bethel Township of Miami County. The school thereby serves residents of the city of New Carlisle, the village of Donnelsville, the unincorporated communities of Medway, Park Layne, and Crystal Lakes, plus adjacent rural land.

== History ==
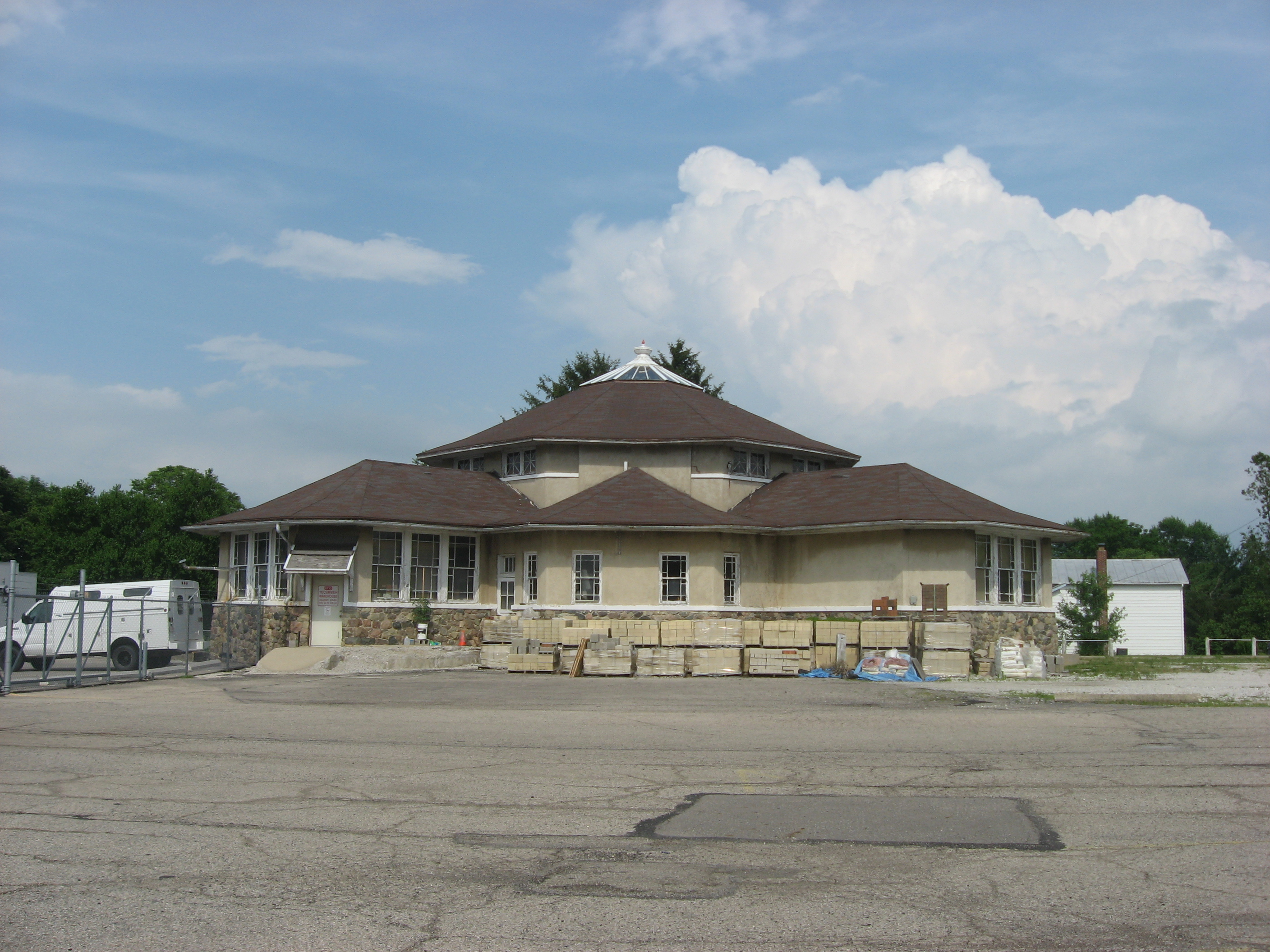
Olive Branch High School

In March 1952, Tecumseh High School's initial construction was completed. The high school replaced New Carlisle High School (in the city of New Carlisle proper since 1921), and Olive Branch High School. In 1969 an expansion was built and contained more classrooms, auditorium, and a second gymnasium.

At the end of the 1980–1981 school year neighboring Oscar T. Hawke elementary school closed and the building became part of the Tecumseh High School campus at the beginning of the 1981–1982 school year. This was part of a major re-organization of the school district which included the closing of McAdams Elementary, and New Carlisle Elementary which had occupied the original New Carlisle High School. Also at that time ninth grade was moved from the junior high schools to the high school creating a four-year high school program. Additionally, sixth grade was moved from the elementary schools to the junior high buildings and the junior highs were changed to the middle school format of sixth, seventh, and eighth grades.

In late May 1989 a mild tornado flew over the school and did some roof damage to the Hawke building. This caused school to be closed for one day and finals for the classes housed in that building had to be moved to the main school building.

In the mid-2000s, all Tecumseh district schools were completely rebuilt. In 2007, as part of this project, the high school's old buildings, with the exception of the field house and auditorium, were demolished and replaced with new facilities.

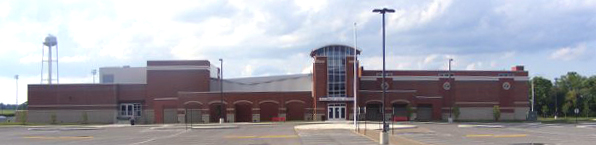
The new school building

== Athletics ==
Tecumseh High School belongs to the Ohio High School Athletic Association. The school's sports teams are named the Arrows.

=== State championships ===
- Boys basketball – 1940 OHSAA Class A champions (as New Carlisle High School)

== Air Force Junior ROTC ==
In the fall of 1988 Aerospace Science was added to the curriculum in the form of Air Force Junior Reserve Office Training Corps. The unit designation is OH-881. (OH for Ohio, 88 for the year, and 1 because it was the first and only unit created in the state that year)

Wesley R. Williams, Staff Sergeant, United States Army, became the first alumnus of the school's JROTC program to be killed in combat on December 10, 2012. He died in Kandahar, Afghanistan, of wounds suffered when enemy forces attacked his unit with an improvised explosive device. He was assigned to the 1st Battalion, 38th Infantry Regiment, 4th Stryker Brigade Combat Team, 2nd Infantry Division, under control of the 7th Infantry Division, Joint Base Lewis-McChord, Washington. Williams was a member of the Tecumseh Class of 2005 and left behind a wife, a one-year-old daughter, and an unborn child.

== Marching Band ==
Since 2009, the Tecumseh Marching Arrows have gone through four directors.

Before the summer of 2012 Bryan Martin served as marching band director.

From the fall 2012 season until the summer of 2014 Patrick Woods served as director of the marching band. The band qualified for OMEA State competition in 2012 and 2014.

From the 2015 season until the end of the 2024 season, Melissa Willardson served as director. The band qualified for OMEA 2015, 2016, and 2019 State Marching Band competitions.

For the 2025 season and on, Gwen Chappell became director for the marching band.

== Notable alumni ==
- Tom D. Crouch, Senior Curator, Aeronautics, National Air and Space Museum of the Smithsonian Institution
- Wayne Embry (1954) Former NBA player, 1999 inductee to Basketball Hall of Fame, former NBA General Manager for the Milwaukee Bucks, Cleveland Cavaliers, and Toronto Raptors. First African American to be the general manager of any professional sports team.
- Tyler Maynard (1997), film and stage actor
- Spanky McFarland (1972), college baseball coach at Northern Illinois and James Madison
- Larry Owen (1974), baseball player
- J. T. Brubaker (2012), pitcher for Pittsburgh Pirates
