= Tecumseh Local School District =

School district in Ohio, United States

Address
- 9760 West National Road New Carlisle, (Clark County), Ohio, 45344; United States

District information
- Type: Public
- Grades: K-12
- Established: March 1, 1948; 78 years ago
- Superintendent: Paula Crew
- Schools: 5
- NCES District ID: 3904624

Students and staff
- Students: 2,555 (2024–2025)
- Teachers: 160.39 (on an FTE basis) (2024–2025)
- Staff: 257.42 (on an FTE basis) (2024–2025)
- Student–teacher ratio: 15.93 (2024–2025)

Other information
- Website: www.tecumseh.k12.oh.us

The Tecumseh Local School District (also known as Tecumseh Local Schools, and as New Carlisle–Bethel Local Schools before 1989) is a school district in western Clark County, Ohio. It consists of one Middle School, one High School and three Elementary Schools.

== Boundaries ==
The district encompasses all but the northeastern corner of Bethel Township of Clark County, plus the southwestern corner of Pike Township of Clark County and part of the eastern side of Bethel Township of Miami County. The district thereby serves residents of the city of New Carlisle, the village of Donnelsville, the unincorporated communities of Medway, Park Layne, and Crystal Lakes, plus adjacent rural land.

== History ==
=== Early settlement ===
The conclusion of the American Revolutionary War in 1783 resulted in, among other things, the British ceding to the newly formed United States a large swath of densely forested land west of Pennsylvania, northwest of the Ohio River, and east of the Mississippi River. This land was inhabited by Indian tribes, but a boundary set in 1785 by the Treaty of Greenville relegated the natives to the northern and western parts of this "Old Northwest" Territory. Two areas of the remaining land were claimed by Connecticut and Virginia for payment of military veterans. This left what is now the east, southeast, and southwest areas of the state of Ohio as U.S. Government-owned land to be surveyed, divided into townships, and opened to general settlement. Several other states' competing claims to this area were resolved by 1787, enabling the formal designation of the bulk of the entire region, including Indian land, as the new Northwest Territory.

Settlement of the non-Indian portion of the Northwest Territory commenced in 1788 with the establishment of Marietta along the southeastern border. Tens of thousands of settlers that soon poured into the surrounding area; by 1800, there were 45,000 residents scattered throughout the eastern and southern parts of the territory, plus about 100 to 150 settlers within a 40 square mile radius of the settlement of Urbana—an area which includes a settlement established in 1790 by John Paul at the forks of Honey Creek, about one mile northeast of what is now New Carlisle. With the rapid settlement came a need for self-governance and the benefits of statehood. Ohio became the first state to be carved out of the Northwest Territory in 1803.

=== Private schools ===
Once settlers cleared the land, built homes, and planted crops, they fashioned institutions that were to bring civilization to the wilderness. Codes of law were drawn up and churches were established. Wherever half a dozen or more families lived reasonably close together, a log schoolhouse was usually to be found.

Nevertheless, as early as 1805, according to Beers 1881 History, a schoolhouse was erected on the farm of Captain McPherson, located on Section 21, near the present site of Tecumseh High School. Another was located on the farm of George Lowman of New Carlisle, located near the juncture of present-day Addison-Carlisle Road and Route 235. Both were known as landmarks and used as points of reference by the early settlers. These schools were supported by private subscription, not public taxes. A subscription school was also supported in the village of New Carlisle possibility as early as 1810 or 1812.

Other primitive schools in Bethel Township, previous to 1820, include Keifer Detrick, located just north of the present George Rogers Clark on Tecumseh Road; and Valley School, at the foot of Minnick's Hill on south Enon Road near the Valley Pike. There is some indication that it may have been the first school in Bethel Township. Apparently, John Layton, an early settler to the area, taught in a shanty at the foot of Minnick's hill in 1808. Wallace School, which was located at the northwest corner of the former Wallace farm at the junction of present-day Whaley and Union Roads was established about 1810 or 1812. The county was sparsely populated and children came on foot and horseback to attend the schools.

The early efforts in establishing a free common school system for all in Ohio were haphazard and met with resistance. An act to provide for the "Regulation and Support of common Schools" was passed in 1821. The law committed the state to the idea of taxation, but it was permissive, not compulsory, and not designed to make "free public schools". Therefore, only the more affluent that could afford to pay a subscription could attend. Some enterprising teachers were paid in "trade". This included trading educational services for lodging, house rent, farm products, and clothing.

The second generation of schools in Bethel Township began in 1835 when a new brick structure replaced the old log structure on the Wallace farm near where Whaley Road intersects Union Road. New Carlisle built a school on the northeast corner of Scott and Jefferson Streets in 1838. Over the next several years, school buildings were erected throughout the township in Medway, Donnelsville, the Bellefontaine Road (Route 235, on the present-day Gastineau property), Quick Road and Bethel, where Bethel Baptist Church is situated. The Linden Hill Academy was built in New Carlisle in 1850. Students came from throughout southwestern Ohio and even other states to attend this finishing school.

=== Public schools ===
By the conclusion of the Civil War, public opinion, in general, was positive and more progressive toward providing for schooling needs of our youth. Citizens were giving more willingly of their resources for the erection of buildings, the provision of furniture, educational materials, and the salaries of teachers. The citizens of New Carlisle and Bethel Township were no less interested in the furtherance of education for their children.

From about 1867 through 1887, sub-district schools, numbering eleven different sites, were erected at convenient locations throughout the township most all within two miles of every child in the school districts. These schools provided the privilege of free public education placed within the reach of all and paid for by taxes.

In 1880, after considerable opposition, a room was set aside in the Olive Branch building for the purpose of establishing a centralized High School for the township. New Carlisle had already established a centralized school in 1869, some eleven years earlier when they took over the old Linden Hill Academy from the Cincinnati United Methodist Conference.

The agitation for a new school at Olive Branch began in February 1900. It would be seven years later (1907) before the first round structure was built. That building was destroyed by fire in 1913. A second structure was built on the same foundation. It was identical to the first building, with one exception. Doors were added to each classroom so students could easily exit the building in case of fire. The building served the district into the early 1970s. Today it is used as a district warehouse and storage center.

The fourth generation of schools commenced with the building of the New Carlisle School on West Madison Street in 1921. The Medway, Donnelsville and Olive Branch buildings were erected over the next seven years. These schools served the district through the depression years and World War II.

Following World War II, the community gave their overwhelming support to consolidate the New Carlisle Local Schools and Olive Branch Local Schools into the New Carlisle–Bethel Local School District. This occurred on June 15, 1948.

=== Modern schools ===
Construction on the district's new high school, Tecumseh, was begun in late 1950 and was completed in March 1952. The class of 1952, while not able to attend classes in the building, were privileged to hold Baccalaureate and Commencement exercises in the auditorium–gymnasium of the new complex in May of that year. The school was named after Tecumseh, a famous chief of the Shawnee Nation who lived in the area in the 19th century.

The completion of Tecumseh ushered in the fifth generation of schools to be built in Bethel Township. For the next seventeen years, the district would grow from about 1000 to 6800 students. New buildings, building additions and renovations would continue almost non-stop until 1969 when McAdams was completed and opened for use.

Beginning in the 1980–81 school year, corporal punishment (paddling) was abolished in the district, in favor of the detention system, considered more contemporary and less cruel. Corporal punishment was not banned statewide until 2009.

During the 1981–82 school year, the elementary schools hosted grades K–6, the two junior high schools hosted grades 7–9, and the high school hosted grades 10–12. In the fall of 1981 a large restructuring took place such that the elementary schools only hosted grades K–5, the junior highs became middle schools hosting grades 6–8, and the high school hosted grades 9–12. To facilitate the influx of 9th graders to the high school, Oscar T. Hawke Elementary was closed and the building was incorporated into the high school campus. New Carlisle Elementary was also closed at that time and its students were moved to Westlake Elementary.

Effective the 1989–90 school year, the district's name changed from New Carlisle–Bethel Local Schools to Tecumseh Local School District, in order to alleviate confusion with Bethel Local Schools in nearby Miami County and Carlisle Local Schools in Carlisle, Ohio.

At the beginning of the 2011–12 school year, Medway Elementary was closed, and the elementary schools were rearranged from neighborhood schools to grade-level schools. Donnelsville Elementary houses grades K–1, Park Layne Elementary houses grades 2–3, New Carlisle Elementary houses grades 4–5.

== Current buildings ==
In 2003, the district received a grant to build new schools. Below are the names of the current schools in the District and the year they were built:

1. Tecumseh Middle School – 2007; replaced Olive Branch Middle School and New Carlisle Middle School.
2. New Carlisle Elementary – 2007; replaced Westlake Elementary and was built on the site of the former New Carlisle Middle School.
3. Donnelsville Elementary – 2006.
4. Medway Elementary – 2006; closed 2011.
5. Park Layne Elementary – 2007.
6. Tecumseh High School – 2008. New building was built attached to and behind the 1969 Auditorium, Gym and Field House, which were not demolished with the rest of the old building.

== Former buildings ==
Below are the names of the old buildings, the year they were built, and their current status:

1. Donnelsville Elementary – 1928; expanded 1957; demolished 2006.
2. McAdams Elementary, later McAdams Early Learning Center Kindergarten – 1969; demolished 2006. Kindergarten teachers and classes moved to the 4 elementary schools when the school closed in 2005.
3. Medway Elementary – 1928; demolished 2006.
4. New Carlisle Elementary – 1921; expanded 1952; closed 1981. The building was New Carlisle High School from 1921–1952, but actually housed grades K–12. After sitting empty for over forty years and several failed plans for use, the building was demolished in July of 2021.
5. New Carlisle Middle School – 1966; demolished 2007. The building was New Carlisle Junior High from 1966–1981.
6. Olive Branch High School (original "Little Round School House") – 1908 (after 8 years of planning); destroyed by fire in 1913. As the district did not exist until 1948, this building was never part of it. It is listed here as it is historically significant for the area the district encompasses.
7. Olive Branch High School (replacement "Little Round School House") – 1914; closed 1928; reopened for one year as an overflow elementary school in 1961 due to overcrowding during the post–World War II baby boom. The building was used for storage for many years, but is currently empty and was saved from being demolished in 2006 by being placed on the National Register of Historic Places. There are plans to make it a museum.
8. Olive Branch Middle School – 1928; expanded 1956 and 1969; demolished 2007. The building was Olive Branch Junior High School from 1952–1981, and Olive Branch High School from 1928–1952.
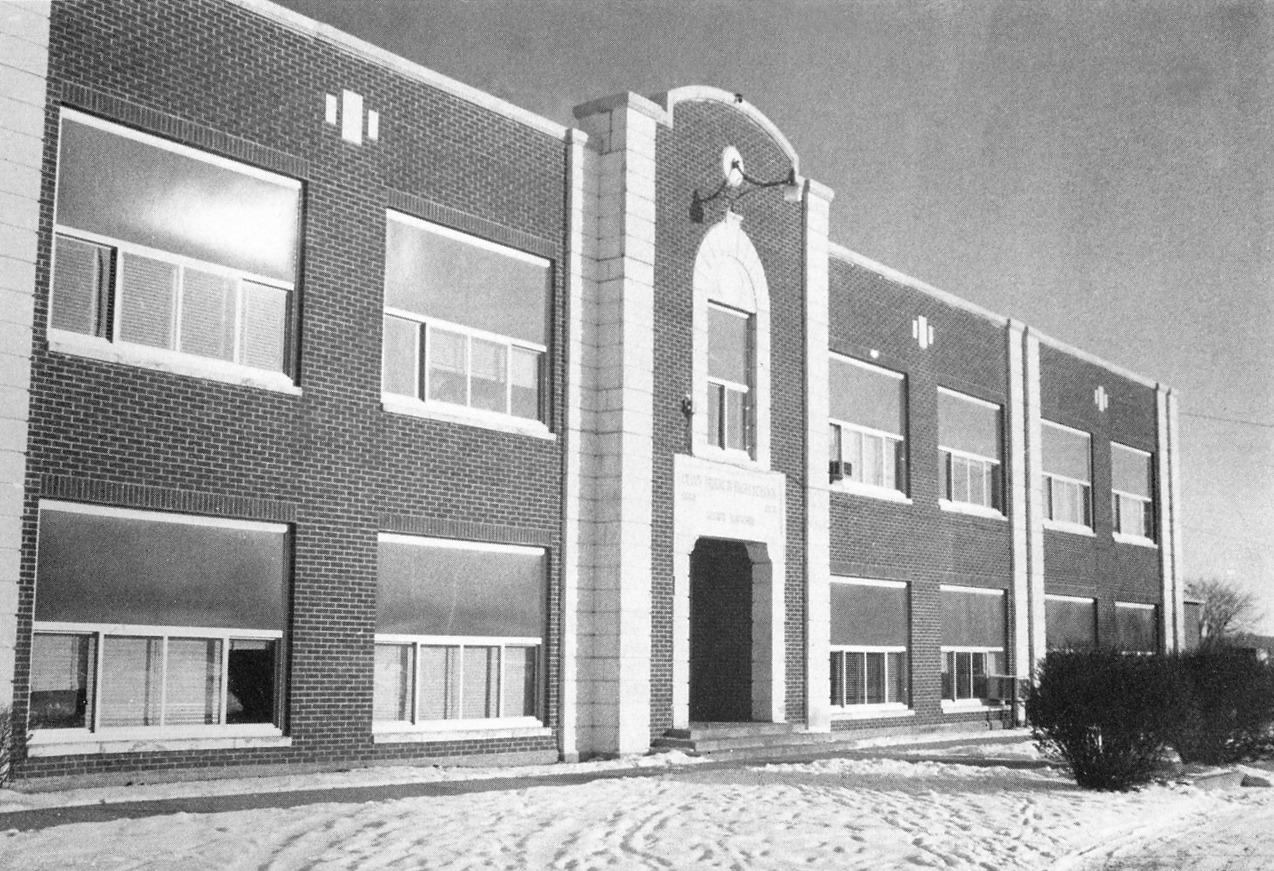
  Olive Branch Middle School as it appeared in 1984
9. Oscar T. Hawke Elementary – 1958; demolished 2007. The building became part of Tecumseh High School in 1981.
10. Park Layne Elementary – 1964; demolished 2007.
11. Tecumseh High School – 1952; expanded 1964 and 1969; demolished 2007, except the portion of the 1969 expansion that included the auditorium and field house, which were incorporated into the school's new building.
12. Westlake Elementary – 1964; expanded 1969; demolished 2007.
