= Northwestern Local School District =

School district in Ohio, United States

Address
- 5610 Troy Road Springfield, Ohio, 45502; United States

District information
- Type: Public
- Grades: PK–12
- Schools: 2
- NCES District ID: 3904626

Students and staff
- Students: 1,681 (2024–2025)
- Teachers: 84.00 (on an FTE basis) (2024–2025)
- Staff: 213.54 (on an FTE basis) (2024–2025)
- Student–teacher ratio: 20.01 (2024–2025)

Other information
- Website: www.northwestern.k12.oh.us

Northwestern Local School District is a school district mostly in Clark County, Ohio.

The district includes Tremont City, North Hampton, and Lawrenceville, as well as a portion of Springfield. It includes German Township, most of Pike Township. The portion in Clark County covers 68 square miles (180 km^{2}). A small portion is in Champaign County, where it takes parts of Mad River and Urbana townships.

There are two schools: Northwestern Elementary School and Northwestern Junior/Senior High School.

== History ==
Jesse Steiner, who was superintendent, resigned in 2023 and became a consultant. He and the board of trustees reached an agreement to do this.

Jeff Patrick, who was superintendent, was scheduled to retire on July 31, 2026. Ryan Rismiller was scheduled to become the superintendent.
