= Tom D. Crouch =

American historian

- Education: Ohio University, Miami University, Ohio State University
- Awards: Christopher Award, AIAA Gardner-Lasser Literature Prize
- Scientific career
- Fields: Aeronautical history
- Workplaces: National Museum of American History, National Air and Space Museum

Tom Day Crouch (born February 28, 1944) is an American aeronautics historian and curator.

== Biography ==
=== Life ===
Crouch was born in Dayton, Ohio and grew up just outside of Dayton in Crystal Lakes, between Medway and New Carlisle. He is a graduate of Tecumseh High School, and was inducted into the school's Hall of Honor in 2002.

Crouch attended Ohio University, where he received a Bachelor of Arts degree in history in 1966. He also attended Miami University and received a Master of Arts degree in history there in 1968. He later earned a Ph.D. in history from the Ohio State University in 1976. In 2001 the Wright State University awarded him with an honorary Doctor of Humane Letters degree.

On November 2, 1963, Crouch married Nancy Anne Gochenouer. They have three children.

=== Career ===
An employee of the Ohio Historical Society, 1968–1974, Crouch planned the exhibits for the Neil Armstrong Museum, Wapakoneta, Ohio and the history exhibitions for the Ohio Historical Center. He accepted a curatorial position with the National Air and Space Museum (NASM) in 1974, and prepared exhibitions for the opening of that building in 1976. He transferred to the National Museum of American History (NMAH) in 1983, where he remained until 1990, rising to the position of chairman, social and cultural history. He was involved in planning the "More Perfect Union: Japanese-Americans and the U.S. Constitution" exhibition. He was named chairman of the aeronautics department of the NASM in 1990, and in 1999 was named senior curator, aeronautics. Crouch was appointed by then-president William J. Clinton to chair the federal advisory board planning activities commemorating the first flight of Orville and Wilbur Wright in 2003. He also participated in and worked to resolve the issues over the Enola Gay bomber being displayed at the National Air and Space Museum. Crouch is the author of some fifteen books and many articles, primarily on topics related to the history of flight technology.

He rededicated the Portal of the Folded Wings Shrine to Aviation in Burbank, California, in May 1996.

Crouch became a regular guest in the National Air and Space Museum's television show, STEM in 30. He appeared in eight episodes from 2014-2018.

== Bibliography ==
=== As author ===
- The giant leap: a chronology of Ohio aerospace events and personalities, 1815-1969. Columbus, OH: Ohio Historical Society. 1971.
- A dream of wings : Americans and the airplane, 1875-1905. New York, NY: Norton. 1981. ISBN 0393013855.
- Blériot XI, the story of a classic aircraft. Smithsonian Institution Press for the National Air and Space Museum. 1982. ISBN 0874743451.
- The eagle aloft : two centuries of the balloon in America. Washington, DC: Smithsonian Institution Press. 1983. ISBN 087474346X.
- The Bishop's boys : a life of Wilbur and Orville Wright. New York, NY: W W Norton. 1989. ISBN 0393026604.
- Aiming for the stars : the dreamers and doers of the space age. Washington, DC: Smithsonian Institution Press. 1999. ISBN 1560983868.
- First flight : the Wright Brothers and the invention of the airplane. Washington, DC: Division of Publications, Harpers Ferry Center National Park Service, U.S. Department of the Interior. 2002. ISBN 0912627719.
- Wings : a history of aviation from kites to the space age. Washington, DC: Smithsonian Institution Press. 2003. ISBN 0393057674.
- Rocketeers and gentlemen engineers : a history of the American Institute of Aeronautics and Astronautics-- and what came before. Reston, VA: AIAA. 2006. ISBN 1563476681.
- Lighter than air : an illustrated history of balloons and airships. Baltimore, MD: Johns Hopkins University Press. 2009. ISBN 9780801891274.

=== As editor ===
- Apollo : ten years since Tranquility Base. Washington, DC: National Air and Space Museum, distributed by the Smithsonian Institution Press. 1979. ISBN 0874745063.
- Charles A. Lindbergh : an American life. Washington, DC: National Air and Space Museum, Smithsonian Institution. 1977. ISBN 0874743427.

== Recognitions ==
Crouch was awarded a 1989 Christopher Award for his book The Bishop's Boys: A Life of Wilbur and Orville Wright. In 2005 he won the AIAA Gardner-Lasser Literature Prize for the book Wings: A History of Aviation From Kites to the Space Age.
