= Flight 553 =

Flight 553 may refer to:

- TWA Flight 553, mid-air collision on 9 March 1967
- United Airlines Flight 553, crashed on 8 December 1972
