= Mad River Township, Ohio =

Mad River Township, Ohio may refer to:

- Mad River Township, Champaign County, Ohio
- Mad River Township, Clark County, Ohio
- Mad River Township, Montgomery County, Ohio (defunct, now part of Riverside, Ohio)
