= Westville, Ohio =

Unincorporated community in Ohio, U.S.

Coordinates: 40°06′34″N 83°50′17″W

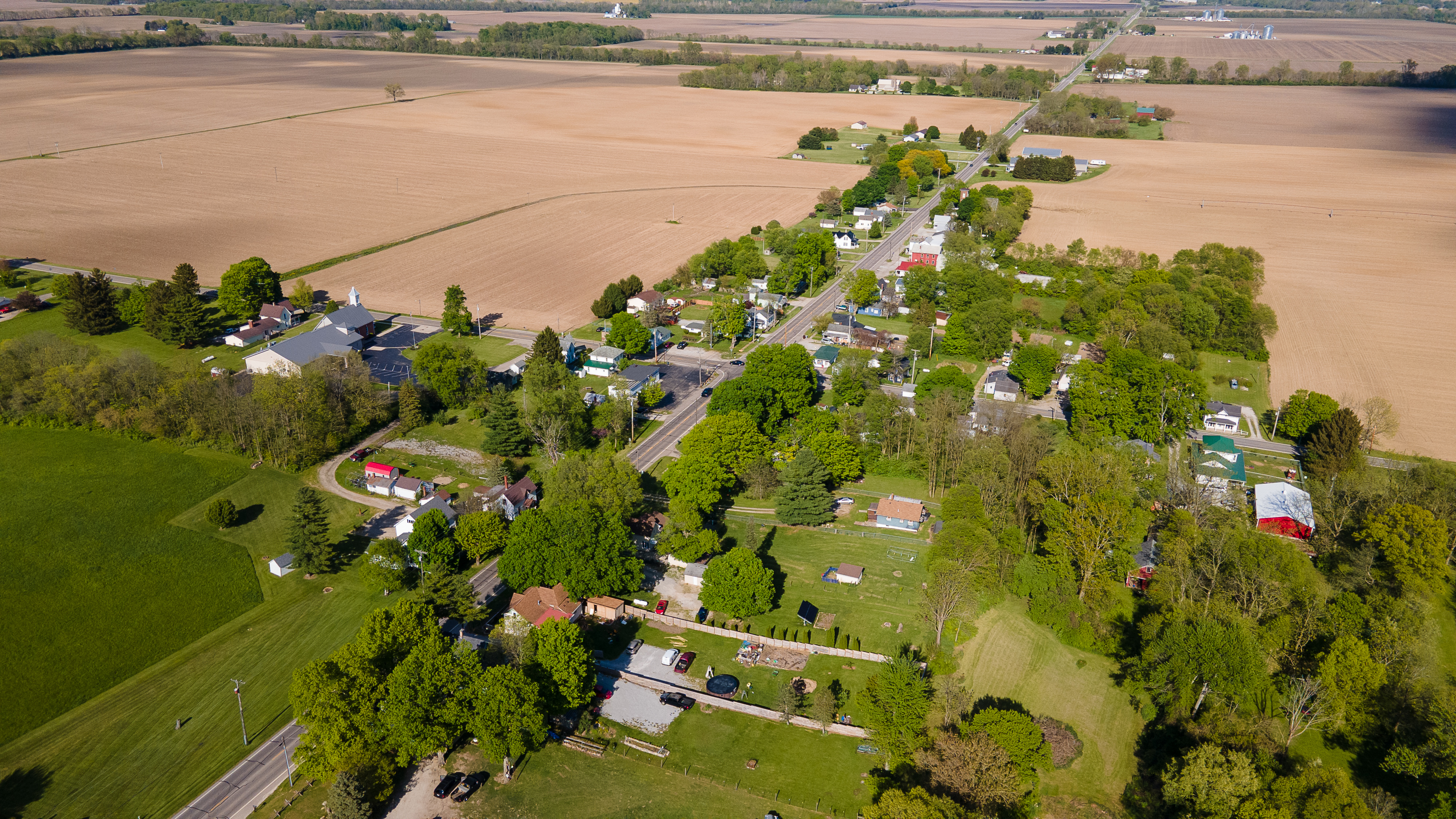
Westville, 2021

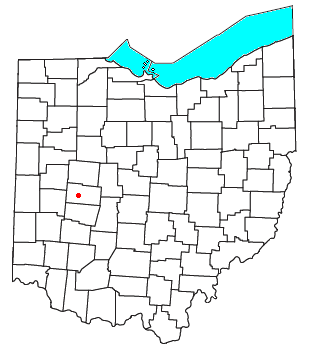
Location of Westville, Ohio

Westville is an unincorporated community in northeastern Mad River Township, Champaign County, Ohio, United States. It has a post office with the ZIP code 43083. It lies at the intersection of U.S. Route 36 with State Route 560.

== History ==
Basil West settled at the site of Westville in 1805. Westville was laid out about 1816. In 1818, the first building was built there on the northwest corner of the main intersection. A post office called Westville has been in operation since 1828.
