= Salem Township, Champaign County, Ohio =

Township in Ohio, US

- Township
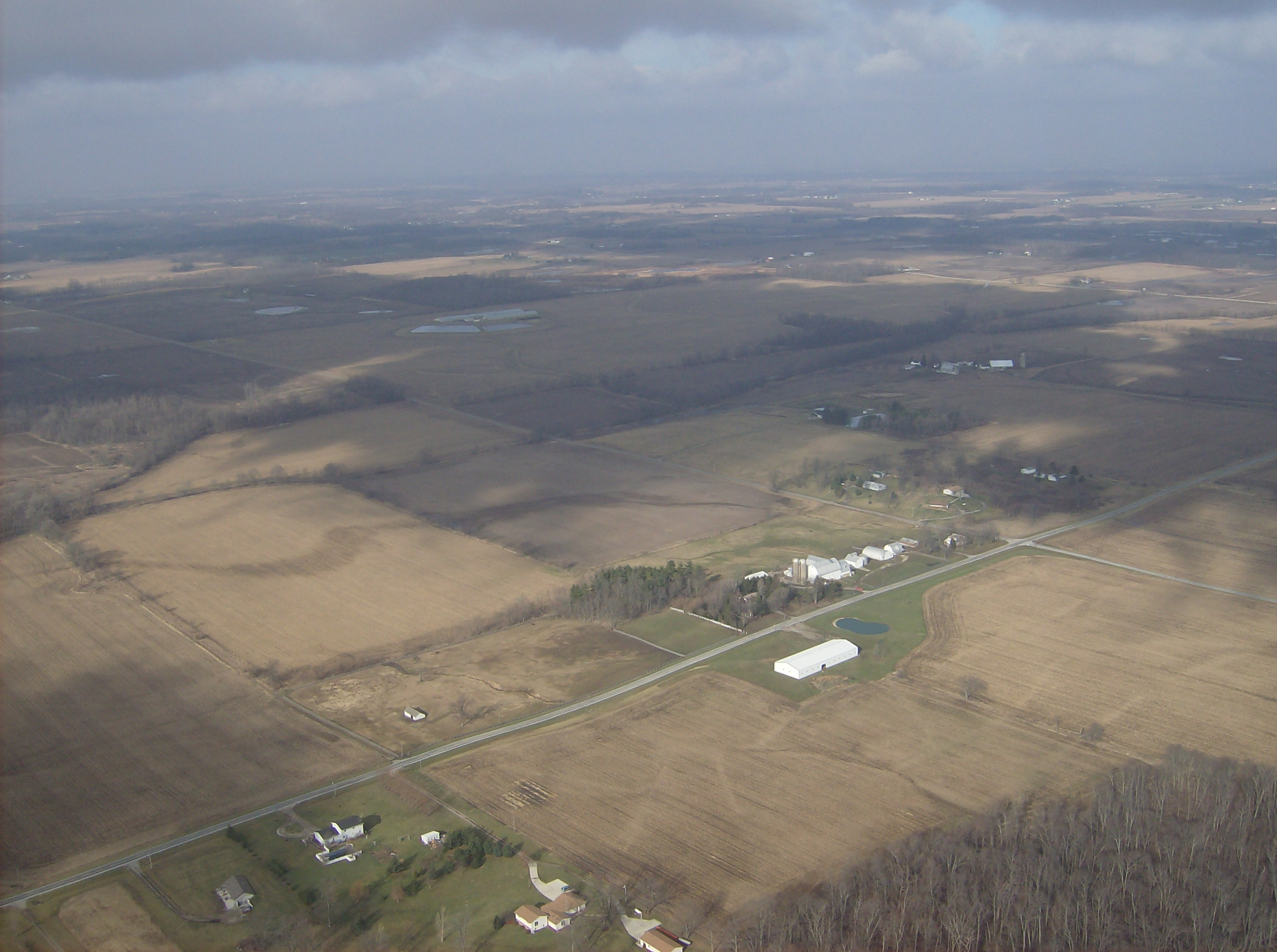
- Fields in western Salem Township

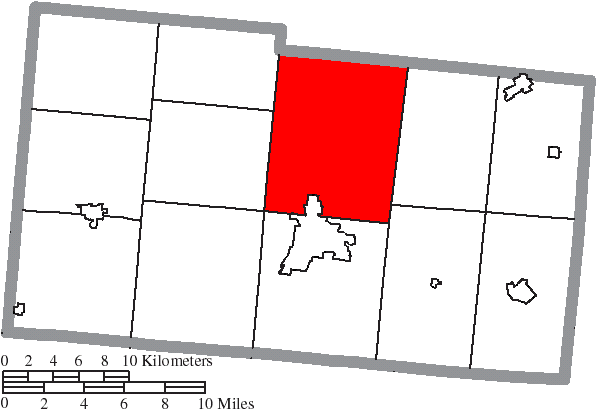
- Location of Salem Township in Champaign County
- Coordinates: 40°11′2″N 83°43′37″W
- Country: United States
- State: Ohio
- County: Champaign

Area
  - Total: 50.8 sq mi (131.6 km^{2})
  - Land: 50.8 sq mi (131.5 km^{2})
  - Water: 0.039 sq mi (0.1 km^{2})
- Elevation: 1,109 ft (338 m)

Population (2020)
  - Total: 2,488
  - Density: 49.00/sq mi (18.92/km^{2})
- Time zone: UTC-5 (Eastern (EST))
  - Summer (DST): UTC-4 (EDT)
- FIPS code: 39-69820
- GNIS feature ID: 1085846

Salem Township is one of the twelve townships of Champaign County, Ohio, United States. The 2020 census reported 2,488 people living in the township.

== Geography ==
Located in the northern part of the county, it borders the following townships:

- Liberty Township, Logan County - north
- Monroe Township, Logan County - northeast
- Wayne Township - east
- Union Township - southeast
- Urbana Township - south
- Mad River Township - southwest corner
- Concord Township - west
- Harrison Township - northwest

A small part of the city of Urbana, the county seat of Champaign County, is located in the southern part of the township, and the unincorporated community of Kennard lies in the township's east. The Ohio Caverns are located in the northeastern part of the township, near the Logan County line.

== Name and history ==
It is one of fourteen Salem Townships statewide.

Salem Township was established in 1805 as one of the first townships in Champaign County.

A historic site in the township is Mount Tabor Methodist Episcopal Church. Built in 1881, it is listed on the National Register of Historic Places.

== Government ==
The township is governed by a three-member board of trustees, who are elected in November of odd-numbered years to a four-year term beginning on the following January 1. Two are elected in the year after the presidential election and one is elected in the year before it. There is also an elected township fiscal officer, who serves a four-year term beginning on April 1 of the year after the election, which is held in November of the year before the presidential election. Vacancies in the fiscal officership or on the board of trustees are filled by the remaining trustees.

== Education ==
West Liberty-Salem High School is located in Salem Township.
