= North Hampton, Ohio =

- Village
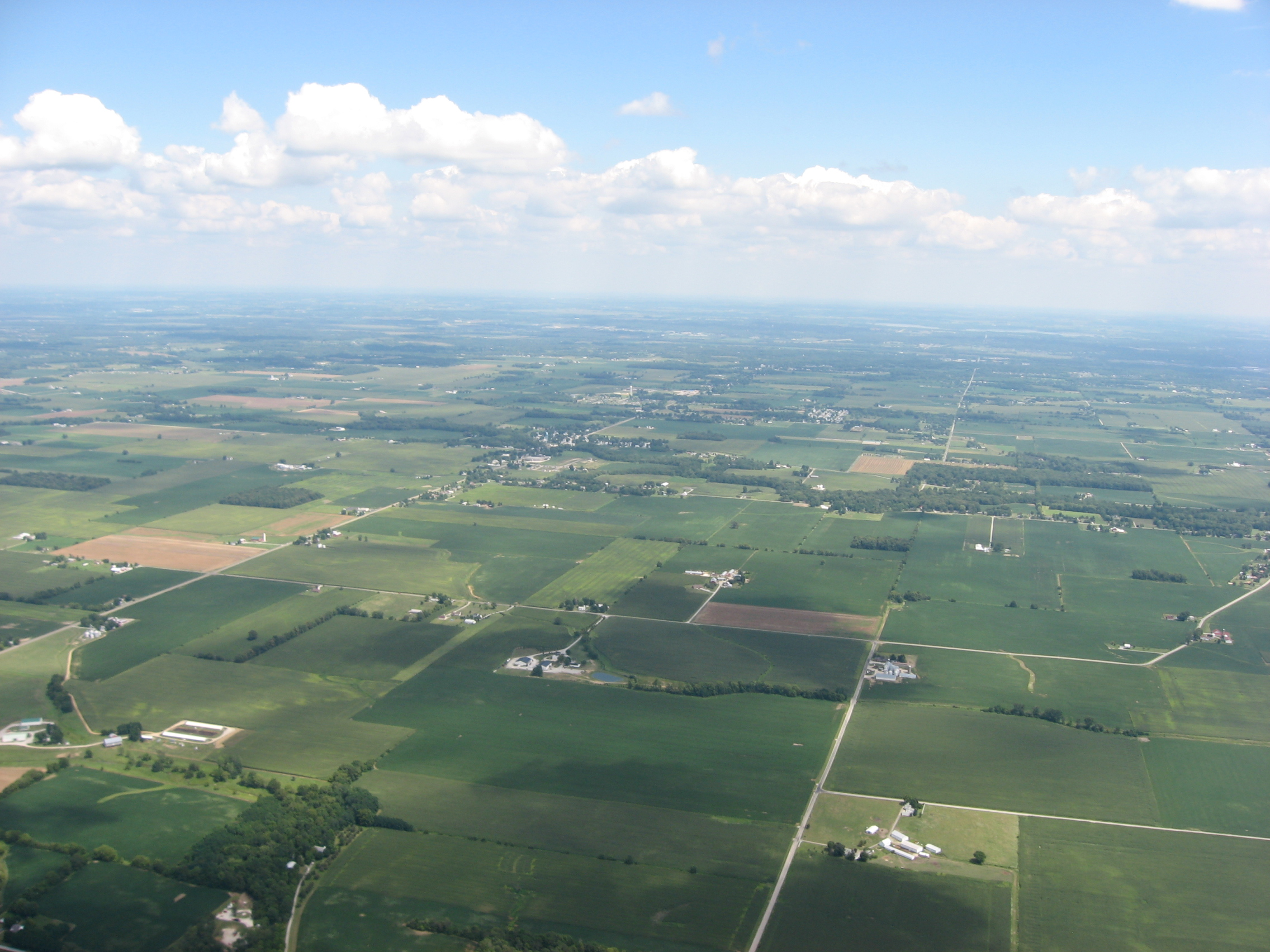
- Countryside surrounding North Hampton, with the village in the distance

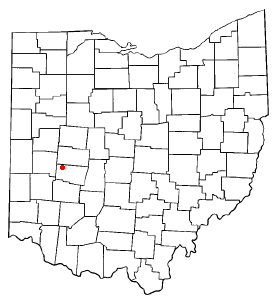
- Location of North Hampton, Ohio

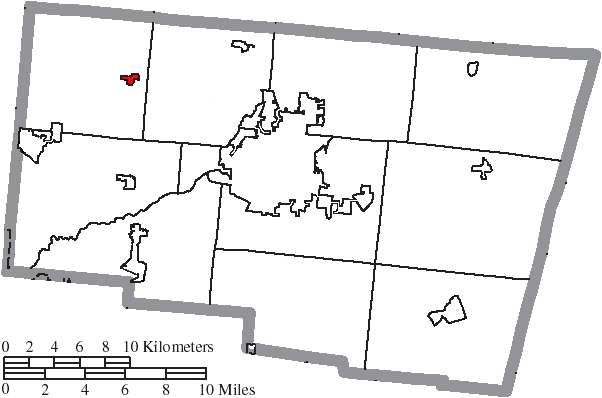
- Location of North Hampton in Clark County
- Coordinates: 39°59′22″N 83°56′38″W
- Country: United States
- State: Ohio
- County: Clark
- Township: Pike

Area
  - Total: 0.39 sq mi (1.00 km^{2})
  - Land: 0.39 sq mi (1.00 km^{2})
  - Water: 0 sq mi (0.00 km^{2})
- Elevation: 1,070 ft (330 m)

Population (2020)
  - Total: 457
  - Density: 1,188/sq mi (458.5/km^{2})
- Time zone: UTC-5 (Eastern (EST))
  - Summer (DST): UTC-4 (EDT)
- ZIP code: 45349
- Area codes: 937, 326
- FIPS code: 39-56588
- GNIS feature ID: 2399515

North Hampton is a village in Clark County, Ohio, United States. The population was 457 at the 2020 census. It is part of the Springfield, Ohio Metropolitan Statistical Area.

== History ==
North Hampton was platted in 1829. A post office called North Hampton has been in operation since 1839.

In 1969, North Hampton earned a place in rock and roll lore when confusion of the town's name with that of Northampton Township, Ohio caused the rock group Vanilla Fudge to arrive at North Hampton for a rock concert instead of the Blossom Amphitheater. After learning that they were nearly 200 miles from the concert venue (near Cleveland), the band then charted a plane to fly them to the gig and arrived four hours late. Vocalist Mark Stein told a reporter later, "You understand, man, that the promoter kept telling our agent about Blossom Center in Northampton Township. Only we were up in Montreal, and looking at a map to find the place and sure enough — there's this town, North Hampton, near Dayton somewhere. We figured, that's a weird place for a concert, but if that's where peoples' heads are at in Ohio, fine — that's where we'll wail."

North Hampton is a well-known speed trap throughout Ohio. The village was one of the municipalities with the highest speeding citation numbers in the state in 2019. In 2022, the village's mayor's court processed 1,065 new cases, making it the third busiest mayor's court per capita in the state.

== Geography ==
North Hampton is located at 39°59′26″N 83°56′30″W (39.990592, -83.941676).

According to the United States Census Bureau, the village has a total area of 0.43 square miles (1.11 km^{2}), all of it land.

== Demographics ==
Historical population
Census	Pop.	Note	%±
1850	147		—
1860	140		−4.8%
1870	205		46.4%
1880	173		−15.6%
1930	369		—
1940	383		3.8%
1950	424		10.7%
1960	495		16.7%
1970	489		−1.2%
1980	421		−13.9%
1990	417		−1.0%
2000	370		−11.3%
2010	478		29.2%
2020	457		−4.4%
U.S. Decennial Census

=== 2010 census ===
As of the census of 2010, there were 478 people, 173 households, and 123 families living in the village. The population density was 1,111.6 inhabitants per square mile (429.2/km^{2}). There were 178 housing units at an average density of 414.0 per square mile (159.8/km^{2}). The racial makeup of the village was 96.9% White, 0.2% Native American, 0.2% Asian, 0.2% from other races, and 2.5% from two or more races. Hispanic or Latino of any race were 1.0% of the population.

There were 173 households, of which 44.5% had children under the age of 18 living with them, 53.8% were married couples living together, 12.7% had a female householder with no husband present, 4.6% had a male householder with no wife present, and 28.9% were non-families. 22.0% of all households were made up of individuals, and 11% had someone living alone who was 65 years of age or older. The average household size was 2.76 and the average family size was 3.17.

The median age in the village was 37.4 years. 28.9% of residents were under the age of 18; 8.7% were between the ages of 18 and 24; 26.1% were from 25 to 44; 24.9% were from 45 to 64; and 11.3% were 65 years of age or older. The gender makeup of the village was 48.3% male and 51.7% female.

=== 2000 census ===
As of the census of 2000, there were 370 people, 135 households, and 103 families living in the village. The population density was 1,440.7 inhabitants per square mile (556.3/km^{2}). There were 136 housing units at an average density of 529.6 per square mile (204.5/km^{2}). The racial makeup of the village was 97.03% White, 0.81% Asian, and 2.16% from two or more races.

There were 135 households, out of which 38.5% had children under the age of 18 living with them, 70.4% were married couples living together, 4.4% had a female householder with no husband present, and 23.7% were non-families. 21.5% of all households were made up of individuals, and 12.6% had someone living alone who was 65 years of age or older. The average household size was 2.74 and the average family size was 3.18.

In the village, the population was spread out, with 28.9% under the age of 18, 7.3% from 18 to 24, 30.0% from 25 to 44, 22.2% from 45 to 64, and 11.6% who were 65 years of age or older. The median age was 35 years. For every 100 females there were 102.2 males. For every 100 females age 18 and over, there were 97.7 males.

The median income for a household in the village was $37,083, and the median income for a family was $55,341. Males had a median income of $32,000 versus $100,000 for females. The per capita income for the village was $12,961. None of the population or families were below the poverty line.

== Education ==
It is in the Northwestern Local School District.

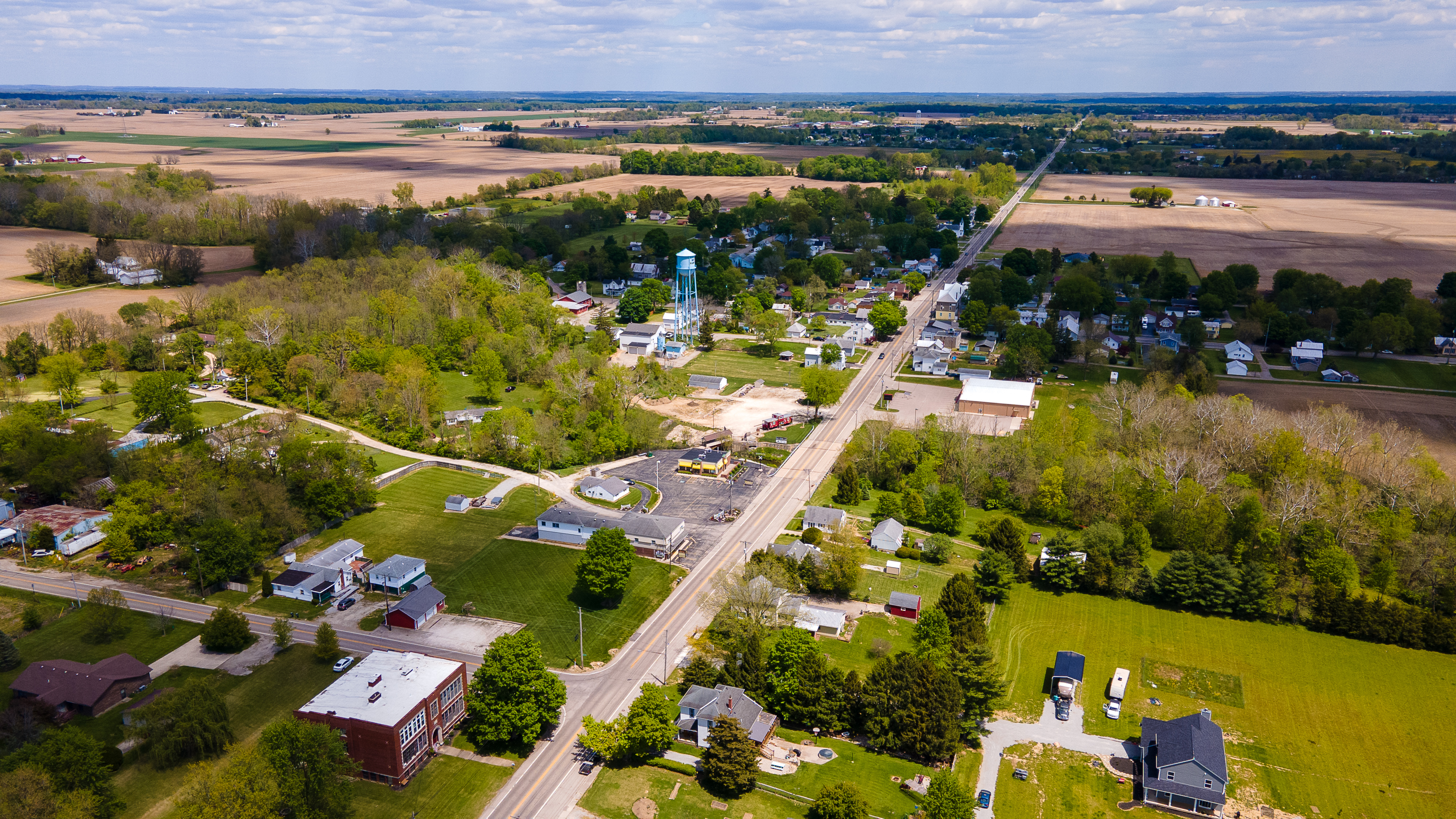
North Hampton, 2021
