= Medway, Ohio =

- Unincorporated community
- Interactive map of Medway, Ohio
- Coordinates: 39°53′01″N 84°00′49″W
- Country: United States
- State: Ohio
- County: Clark
- Elevation: 850 ft (260 m)
- Time zone: UTC-5 (Eastern (EST))
  - Summer (DST): UTC-4 (EDT)
- ZIP code: 45341
- Area codes: 937, 326
- GNIS feature ID: 2812812

Medway is an unincorporated community and census-designated place in Bethel Township, Clark County, Ohio, United States. As of the 2020 census, Medway had a population of 627. It is part of the Springfield, Ohio Metropolitan Statistical Area. Near are the adjoining communities of Crystal Lakes and Park Layne. Medway lies within the Tecumseh Local School District, whose high school mascot is the Arrows. Medway Elementary is the primary center of education for grades k-5.

== History ==
=== European Discovery and the Founding of a Settlement (1671–1771) ===
When European explorers, namely French fur traders, reached the Mad River in 1671, they found an abundance of beaver pelt among other prized furs. They followed the Honey Creek, through the current locations of the town of Medway where they established a small base camp (later moved to a Shawnee trading post near present-day Springfield, Ohio). On September 17, 1671, the Spangler party claimed all the lands comprising the drainage basin of the river, later renamed the Mad River, for Louis XIV as part of New France.

During the 1740s, the Wood's River Land Company, which was represented by Louis de la Corne, Chevalier de la Corne, attained a large tract of land within present-day southwest Ohio. Part of the tract became Clark County and Montgomery County and was sold to settlers entering the region. The Drapier and Ingles families were among those that built their homes somewhere between present locations of Medway and the subdivision of Park Layne. The settlement came to be called Drapier's Meadow by 1748.

Seven years later, the Ohio Valley was involved in the brutality of the French and Indian War. This war resulted in British control over much of France's North American holdings, including the Mad River fur trading posts located in present-day Medway. By the end of the war, the French had retreated and the Shawnee Amerindians gained control over the post. They subsequently moved to Springfield where the tribe already had a large settlement.

=== George Rogers Clark and American Revolution (1772–1797) ===
Medway played a notable role as part of the western campaign during the American Revolutionary War. General George Rogers Clark, led over 1,000 soldiers (among them Daniel Boone and Simon Kenton) across the Ohio River near present-day Cincinnati and engaged in numerous skirmishes with British regulars that had occupied French forts after the French and Indian War, and the Shawnee who were at the time allies of the Red Coats. The Shawnee gradually withdrew during the first few days before finally engaging American forces 7 miles west of Springfield in present-day Medway on August 8, 1782. After several hours of fighting, both sides suffered moderate casualties before scattering the small Shawnee rearguard. The victory against the Shawnee in the Medway/Mad River Valley area discouraged further Amerindian raids against Kentucky and other parts of the American frontier, and helped in part to secure the whole of the Ohio Territory for the Colonials. Rogers later remarked that the area that is now Medway was of significant strategic importance to the American cause as "the Mad River was the artery to the Miami River, and the Miami, the Ohio River thereto." Medway was therefore of strategic importance and, as such, the federal government encouraged many veterans to use their war pensions to settle in the area; descendants of several of these Revolutionary war families reside in the village.

=== Founding of Medway ===
Medway was platted in 1816, and named for being the midway point between Springfield and Dayton. A post office called Medway has been in operation since 1850.

== Notable people ==
- Harvey Haddix, Major League Baseball pitcher and coach.
- Chris Lawson (racing driver), NASCAR pit crew member.
