= Concord Township, Champaign County, Ohio =

Township in Ohio, US

- Township
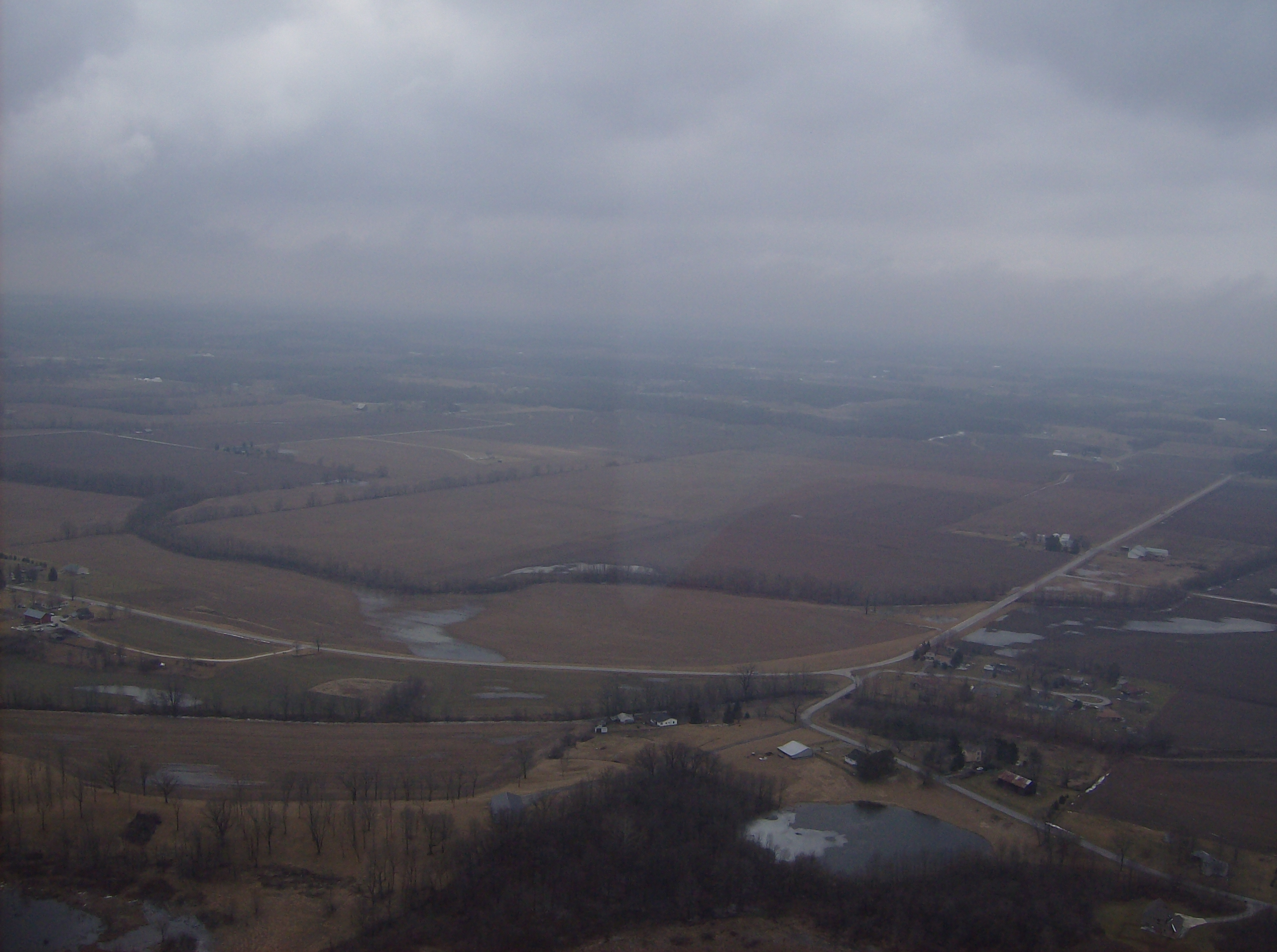
- Countryside in northeastern Concord Township

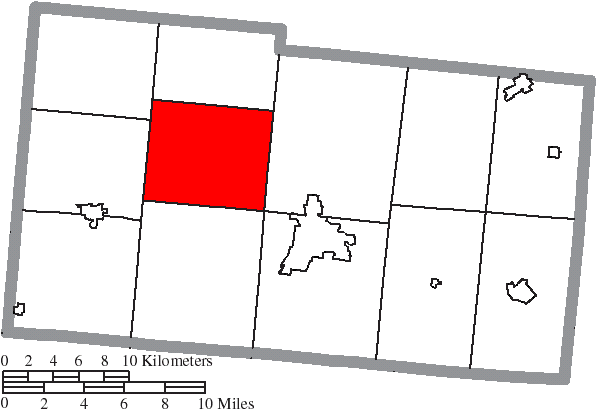
- Location of Concord Township in Champaign County
- Coordinates: 40°10′9″N 83°50′12″W
- Country: United States
- State: Ohio
- County: Champaign

Area
  - Total: 30.2 sq mi (78.1 km^{2})
  - Land: 30.1 sq mi (77.9 km^{2})
  - Water: 0.077 sq mi (0.2 km^{2})
- Elevation: 1,099 ft (335 m)

Population (2020)
  - Total: 1,387
  - Density: 46.1/sq mi (17.8/km^{2})
- Time zone: UTC-5 (Eastern (EST))
  - Summer (DST): UTC-4 (EDT)
- FIPS code: 39-18126
- GNIS feature ID: 1085839

Concord Township is one of the twelve townships of Champaign County, Ohio, United States. The 2020 census reported 1,387 people living in the township.

== Geography ==
Located in the western part of the county, it borders the following townships:

- Harrison Township - north
- Salem Township - east
- Urbana Township - southeast corner
- Mad River Township - south
- Johnson Township - west
- Adams Township - northwest

No municipalities are located in Concord Township.

== Name and history ==
It is one of seven Concord Townships statewide.

Concord Township was established in 1818 from land given by Mad River Township.

Concord Township was the site of the crash of Trans World Airlines Flight 553, a Douglas DC-9-15 which fell to earth in a field following a mid-air collision with a Beechcraft Baron on March 9, 1967, triggering substantial changes in air traffic control procedures.

== Government ==
The township is governed by a three-member board of trustees, who are elected in November of odd-numbered years to a four-year term beginning on the following January 1. Two are elected in the year after the presidential election and one is elected in the year before it. There is also an elected township fiscal officer, who serves a four-year term beginning on April 1 of the year after the election, which is held in November of the year before the presidential election. Vacancies in the fiscal officership or on the board of trustees are filled by the remaining trustees.
