= Kennard, Ohio =

Unincorporated community in Ohio, U.S.

Coordinates: 40°11′35″N 83°40′47″W

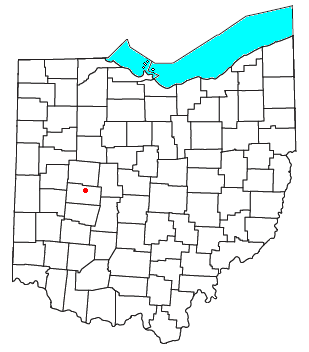
Location of Kennard, Ohio

Kennard is an unincorporated community in eastern Salem Township, Champaign County, Ohio, United States. It lies at the intersection of Gray and Kennard Roads, less than 2 miles (about 3 km) southwest of State Route 245. The headwaters of Kings Creek, a tributary of the Mad River, flow past Kennard. It is located approximately 10 miles (16 km) northwest of the city of Urbana, the county seat of Champaign County.

Kennard was laid out and platted as "Kent" in 1863 when the Atlantic and Great Western Railroad was extended to that point. A post office was established at Kennard in 1865, and remained in operation until 1905.
