= Lawrenceville, Ohio =

- Unincorporated community
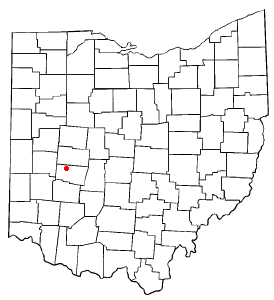
- Location of Lawrenceville, Ohio

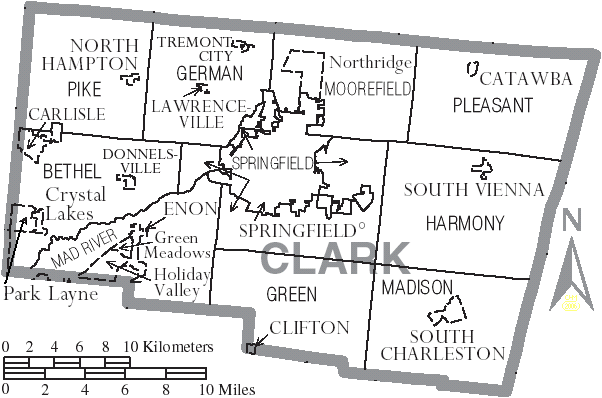
- Detailed map of Clark County showing Lawrenceville's location
- Coordinates: 39°59′02″N 83°52′26″W
- Country: United States
- State: Ohio
- County: Clark

Area
  - Total: 0.49 sq mi (1.27 km^{2})
  - Land: 0.49 sq mi (1.27 km^{2})
  - Water: 0 sq mi (0.00 km^{2})
- Elevation: 1,106 ft (337 m)

Population (2020)
  - Total: 667
  - Density: 1,358.2/sq mi (524.42/km^{2})
- Time zone: UTC-5 (Eastern (EST))
  - Summer (DST): UTC-4 (EDT)
- FIPS code: 39-42210
- GNIS feature ID: 2805296

Lawrenceville is an unincorporated community and census-designated place in central German Township, Clark County, Ohio, United States. It is part of the Springfield, Ohio Metropolitan Statistical Area. The population was 302 at the 2000 census, at which time it was a village. In 2005, the residents of Lawrenceville voted to dissolve the corporation, ending Lawrenceville's village status. Transportation and other services must be sought from Springfield. According to the United States Census Bureau, the village had a total area of 0.1 square miles (0.26 km^{2}), all of it land.

== History ==
Lawrenceville was originally known as Noblesville, and under the latter name was platted in 1843. When a post office was established in the community, the original name was changed, there being another post office in the state with a similar name. A post office called Lawrenceville was established in 1875, and remained in operation until 1901. The name "Lawrenceville" honors U.S. Rep. William Lawrence, a Republican former judge whose congressional district included the community in the 1870s.

== Demographics ==
Historical population
Census	Pop.	Note	%±
2020	667		—
U.S. Decennial Census

As of the census of 2000, there were 302 people, 109 households, and 86 families residing in the village. The population density was 2,243.2 inhabitants per square mile (866.1/km^{2}). There were 119 housing units at an average density of 883.9 per square mile (341.3/km^{2}). The racial makeup of the village was 95.36% White, 0.99% African American, and 3.64% from two or more races.

There were 109 households, out of which 35.8% had children under the age of 18 living with them, 61.5% were married couples living together, 11.0% had a female householder with no husband present, and 21.1% were non-families. 16.5% of all households were made up of individuals, and 3.7% had someone living alone who was 65 years of age or older. The average household size was 2.77 and the average family size was 3.12.

In the village the population was spread out, with 29.1% under the age of 18, 7.6% from 18 to 24, 30.5% from 25 to 44, 23.5% from 45 to 64, and 9.3% who were 65 years of age or older. The median age was 36 years. For every 100 females, there were 106.8 males. For every 100 females age 18 and over, there were 107.8 males.

The median income for a household in the village was $50,000, and the median income for a family was $53,750. Males had a median income of $38,333 versus $19,688 for females. The per capita income for the village was $19,105. About 3.7% of families and 3.1% of the population were below the poverty line, including none of those under the age of eighteen and 20.0% of those 65 or over.

== Education ==
It is in the Northwestern Local School District.
