= Urbana Township, Champaign County, Ohio =

Township in Ohio, US

Urbana Township, Ohio
- Township
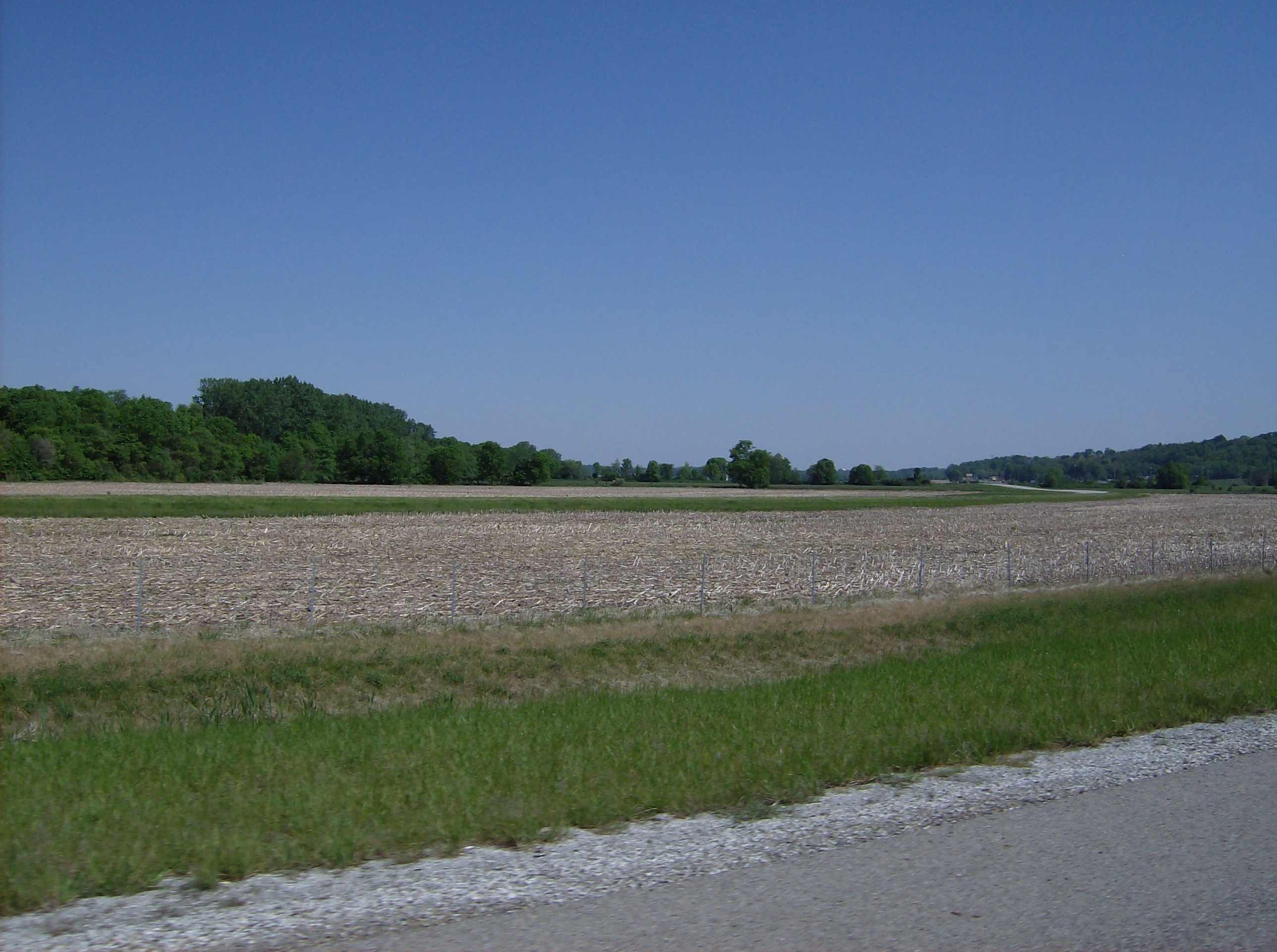
- Farmland in southern Urbana Township

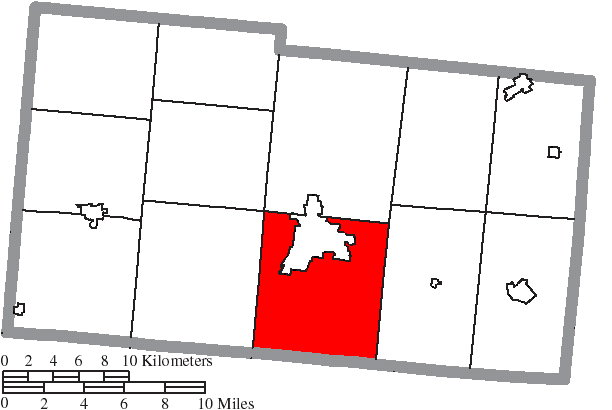
- Location of Urbana Township in Champaign County
- Coordinates: 40°6′2″N 83°45′9″W
- Country: United States
- State: Ohio
- County: Champaign

Area
  - Total: 43.3 sq mi (112.2 km^{2})
  - Land: 43.1 sq mi (111.7 km^{2})
  - Water: 0.19 sq mi (0.5 km^{2})
- Elevation: 1,056 ft (322 m)

Population (2020)
  - Total: 14,119
  - Density: 327.4/sq mi (126.4/km^{2})
- Time zone: UTC-5 (Eastern (EST))
  - Summer (DST): UTC-4 (EDT)
- ZIP code: 43078
- Area codes: 937, 326
- FIPS code: 39-79086
- GNIS feature ID: 1085848
- Website: https://urbanatownship.com/

Urbana Township is one of the twelve townships of Champaign County, Ohio, United States. The 2020 census reported 14,119 people living in the township.

== Geography ==
Located in the southern part of the county, it borders the following townships:

- Salem Township - north
- Union Township - east
- Moorefield Township, Clark County - south
- German Township, Clark County - southwest corner
- Mad River Township - west
- Concord Township - northwest corner

Most of the city of Urbana, the county seat of Champaign County, is located in northern Urbana Township.

== Name and history ==
Urbana Township was established in the 1810s. It is the only Urbana Township statewide.

== Government ==
The township is governed by a three-member board of trustees, who are elected in November of odd-numbered years to a four-year term beginning on the following January 1. Two are elected in the year after the presidential election and one is elected in the year before it. There is also an elected township fiscal officer, who serves a four-year term beginning on April 1 of the year after the election, which is held in November of the year before the presidential election. Vacancies in the fiscal officership or on the board of trustees are filled by the remaining trustees.
