= TWA Flight 553 =

1967 aviation disaster in Concord Township, Ohio, US

Accident
- Date: March 9, 1967
- Summary: Mid-air collision
- Site: Concord Township, Champaign County, near Urbana, Ohio; 40°11′49″N 83°48′46″W
- Total fatalities: 26
- Total survivors: 0

First aircraft
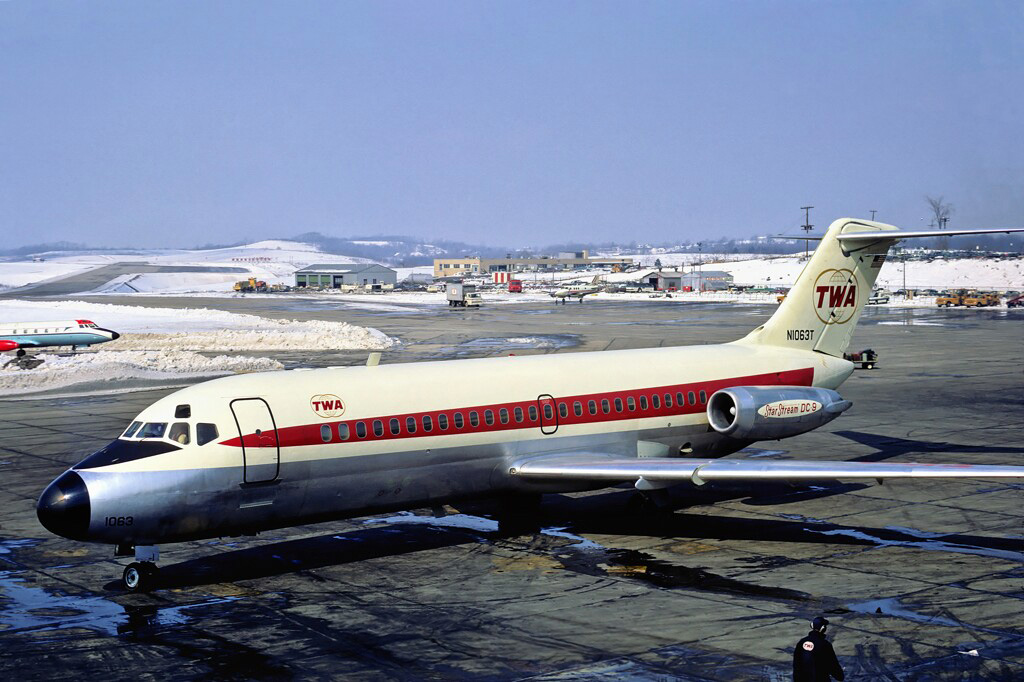
- N1063T, the aircraft involved in the accident, pictured on the day of the crash
- Type: McDonnell Douglas DC-9-15
- Operator: Trans World Airlines
- IATA flight No.: TW553
- ICAO flight No.: TWA553
- Call sign: TWA 553
- Registration: N1063T
- Flight origin: LaGuardia Airport, New York
- 1st stopover: Harrisburg-York State Airport, Pennsylvania
- 2nd stopover: Greater Pittsburgh Airport, Pennsylvania
- Last stopover: Dayton Municipal Airport, Ohio
- Destination: Chicago O'Hare International Airport, Illinois
- Occupants: 25
- Passengers: 21
- Crew: 4
- Fatalities: 25
- Survivors: 0

Second aircraft
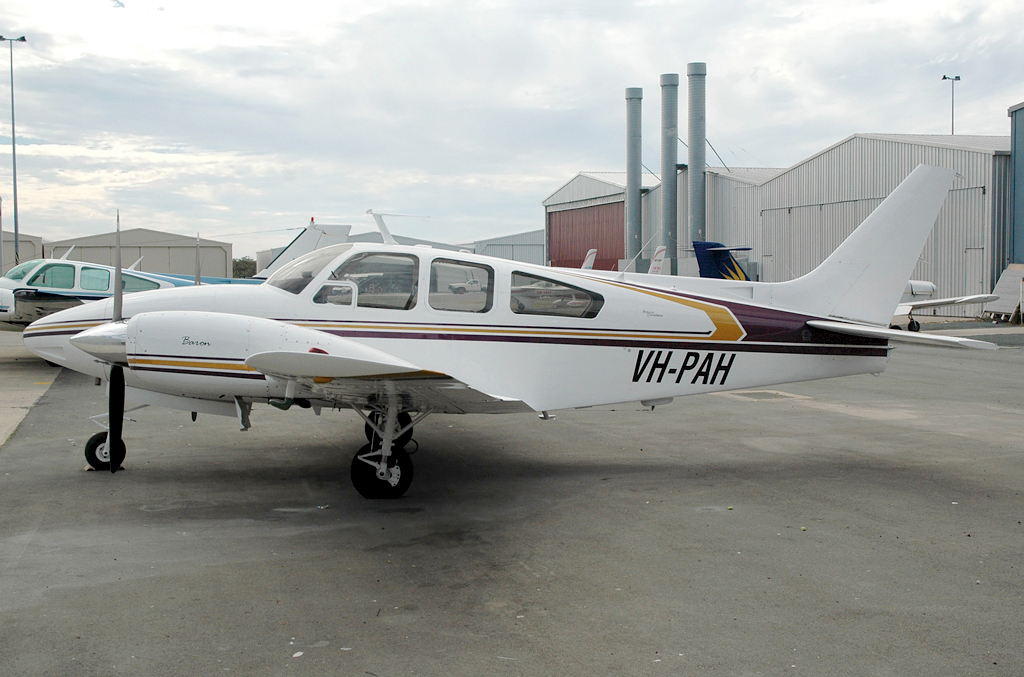
- A Beechcraft Baron 55 similar to the aircraft involved
- Type: Beechcraft Baron 55
- Operator: Private
- Registration: N6127V
- Occupants: 1
- Crew: 1
- Fatalities: 1
- Survivors: 0

TWA Flight 553 was a domestic flight operated by a McDonnell Douglas DC-9 jet airliner, registration N1063T, for Trans World Airlines on March 9, 1967, between Pittsburgh, Pennsylvania, and Dayton, Ohio. While descending toward Dayton about 29 miles (25 nmi; 47 km) from the airport, the aircraft collided in midair with a Beechcraft Baron, a small, general-aviation airplane, near Urbana, Ohio. All 25 aboard the DC-9 and the sole occupant of the Beechcraft were killed.

== Summary ==
Flight 553 departed from Greater Pittsburgh International Airport en route to Dayton Municipal Airport. After passing Columbus, Ohio, Flight 553 had been cleared to descend from flight level (FL) 200 (about 20,000 feet (6,000 m) above sea level) to 3,000 feet (900 m). The flight was in uncontrolled airspace but under the control of Dayton radar approach, which advised the pilots of uncontrolled visual flight rules (VFR) traffic ahead and slightly to the right and one mile away, about 18 seconds before the collision. The crew acknowledged the traffic advisory. As the airliner descended through 4,500 feet (1,400 m) at a speed of 323 knots (372 mph; 598 km/h) on a southwest heading, its front right side collided with the left side of a southbound Beechcraft Baron 55. Both aircraft fell in Concord Township, a rural area northwest of Urbana in Champaign County.

== Cause ==
Visual flight rules (VFR) were in effect at the time of the accident, meaning that the pilots of both aircraft were responsible to "see and avoid" each other. In addition, the radar controller stated that he did not see the Beechcraft on his radar scope until 22 seconds before the crash. Controllers testified that the zone near the crash site was one in which small planes could be difficult to detect on radar, but flight checks in the area proved inconclusive.

The National Transportation Safety Board investigated the accident and determined that because of the DC-9's high rate of descent, its pilots were not able to see the other plane in time to avoid a collision. Weather conditions included widely scattered, thin clouds, with haze reducing visibility to six to seven miles (10 to 11 km), twice the three-mile (5 km) visibility required for VFR flight.

== Aftermath ==
Enacted in 1961 in the wake of the 1960 New York mid-air collision, FAR Part 91.85 mandated speed restrictions below 10,000 feet (3,000 m) within 30 nautical miles (56 km; 35 mi) of a destination airport. After the accident involving Flight 553, in all areas below 10,000 feet (3,000 m) aircraft were prohibited from exceeding 250 knots (290 mph; 460 km/h) IAS. The accident also influenced the Federal Aviation Administration's decision to create terminal control areas or TCAs (now called Class B airspace) around the busiest airports in the country. The airspace around Dayton did not become a TCA, undergoing only minor changes until it was reclassified as Class C airspace in the late 1980s.
