= German Township, Clark County, Ohio =

Township in Ohio, US

- Township
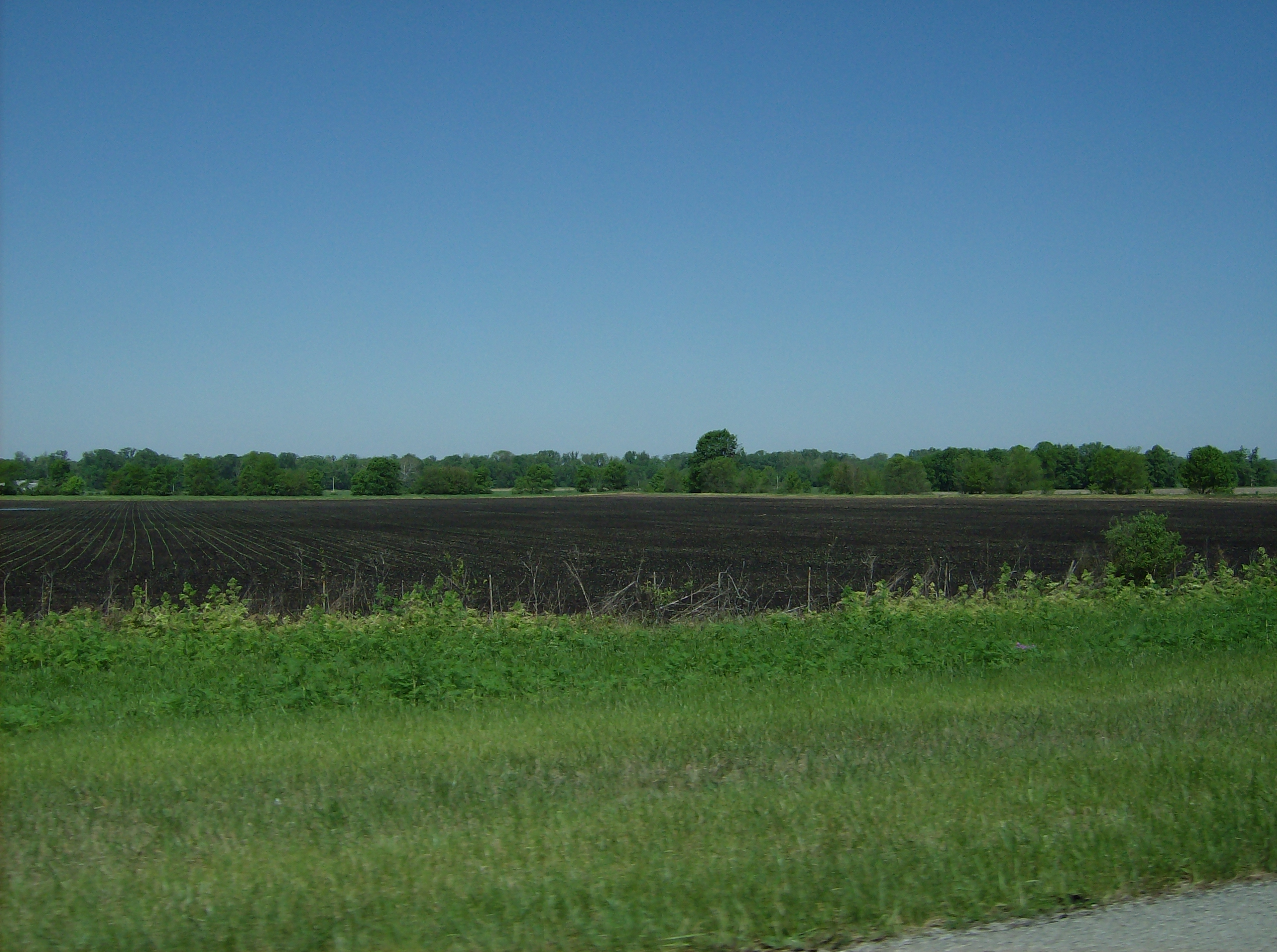
- Farmland in far western German Township

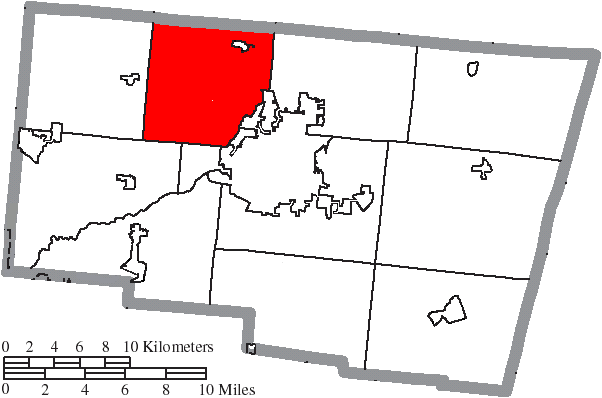
- Location of German Township in Clark County
- Coordinates: 39°58′57″N 83°51′44″W
- Country: United States
- State: Ohio
- County: Clark

Area
  - Total: 33.2 sq mi (85.9 km^{2})
  - Land: 33.1 sq mi (85.8 km^{2})
  - Water: 0.039 sq mi (0.1 km^{2})
- Elevation: 1,073 ft (327 m)

Population (2020)
  - Total: 7,578
  - Density: 229/sq mi (88.3/km^{2})
- Time zone: UTC-5 (Eastern (EST))
  - Summer (DST): UTC-4 (EDT)
- FIPS code: 39-29862
- GNIS feature ID: 1085851
- Website: https://www.germanclarkoh.gov/

German Township is one of the ten townships of Clark County, Ohio, United States. The 2020 census reported 7,578 people living in the township.

== Geography ==
Located in the northern part of the county, it borders the following townships:

- Mad River Township, Champaign County - north
- Urbana Township, Champaign County - northeast corner
- Moorefield Township - east
- Springfield Township - southeast
- Bethel Township - southwest
- Pike Township - west
- Jackson Township, Champaign County - northwest corner

Several communities are located in German Township:

- Lawrenceville, an unincorporated community and census-designated place in the center of the township
- Part of Springfield, the county seat of Clark County, in the southeast of the township
- Tremont City, a village in the northeast of the township

== Name and history ==
German Township was possibly named from the German pioneer settlers.

It is one of five German Townships statewide.

== Government ==
The township is governed by a three-member board of trustees, who are elected in November of odd-numbered years to a four-year term beginning on the following January 1. Two are elected in the year after the presidential election and one is elected in the year before it. There is also an elected township fiscal officer, who serves a four-year term beginning on April 1 of the year after the election, which is held in November of the year before the presidential election. Vacancies in the fiscal officership or on the board of trustees are filled by the remaining trustees.
