= Mad River Township, Champaign County, Ohio =

Township in Ohio, US

- Township
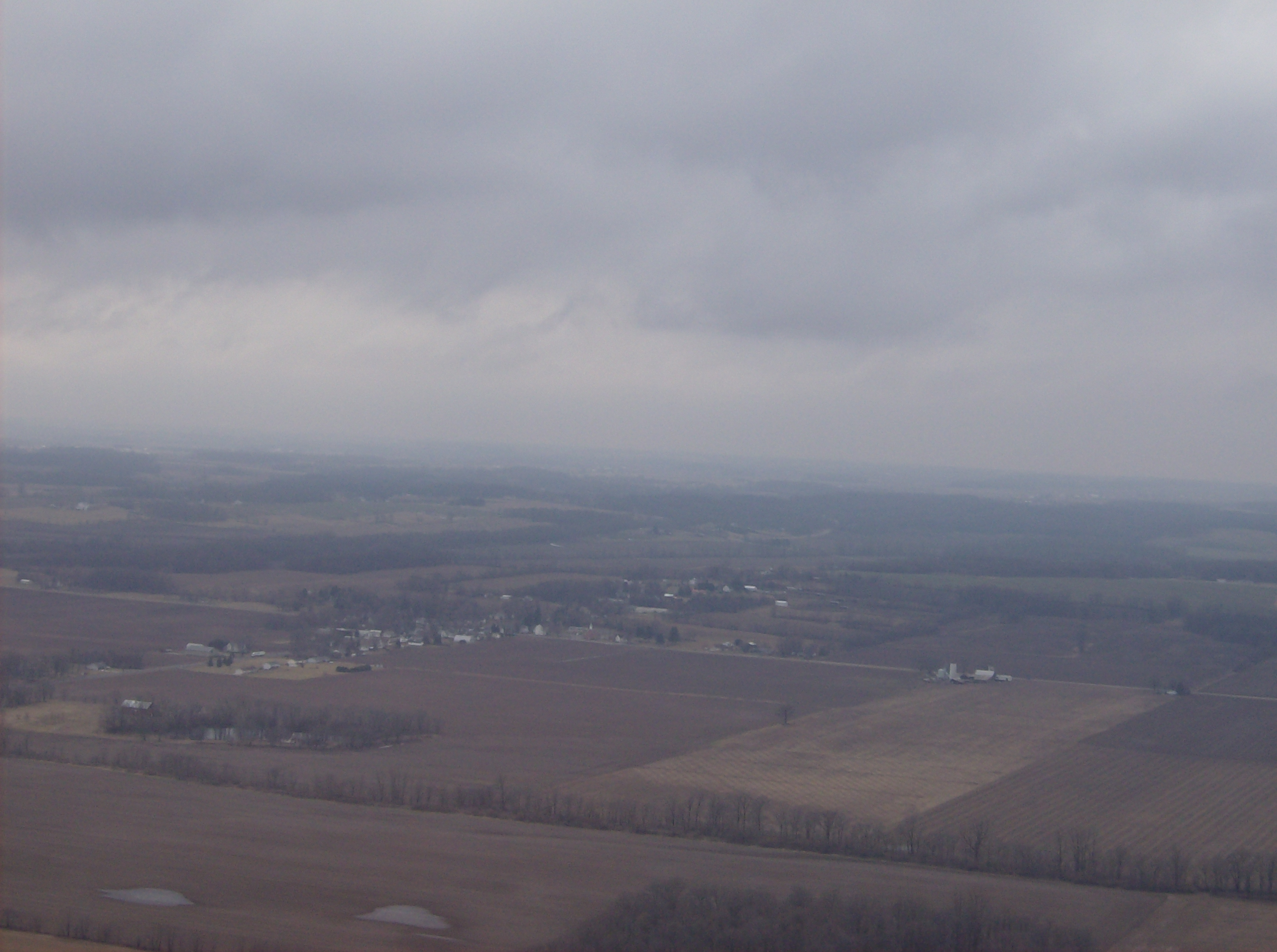
- Countryside in Mad River Township, with Westville in view

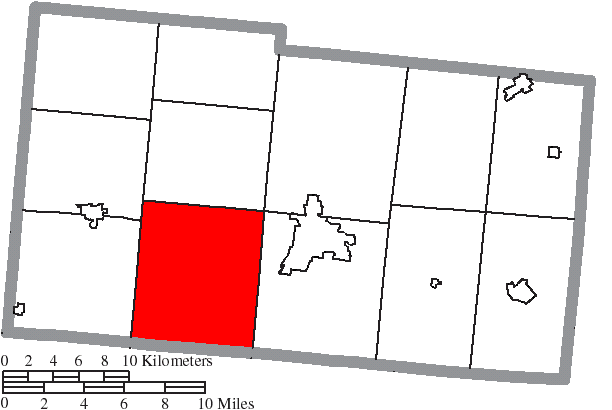
- Location of Mad River Township in Champaign County
- Coordinates: 40°4′29″N 83°51′38″W
- Country: United States
- State: Ohio
- County: Champaign

Area
  - Total: 42.7 sq mi (110.7 km^{2})
  - Land: 42.6 sq mi (110.4 km^{2})
  - Water: 0.12 sq mi (0.3 km^{2})
- Elevation: 1,125 ft (343 m)

Population (2020)
  - Total: 2,765
  - Density: 64.87/sq mi (25.05/km^{2})
- Time zone: UTC-5 (Eastern (EST))
  - Summer (DST): UTC-4 (EDT)
- FIPS code: 39-46760
- GNIS feature ID: 1085844
- Website: http://madrivertwp.org/

Mad River Township is one of the twelve townships of Champaign County, Ohio, United States. As of the 2020 census the population was 2,765.

== Geography ==
Located in the southwestern part of the county, it borders the following townships:

- Concord Township - north
- Salem Township - northeast corner
- Urbana Township - east
- Moorefield Township, Clark County - southeast corner
- German Township, Clark County - south
- Pike Township, Clark County - southwest corner
- Jackson Township - west
- Johnson Township - northwest

No municipalities are located in Mad River Township, although the unincorporated communities of Thackery and Westville lie in the township's southwest and northeast respectively.

== Name and history ==
Mad River Township was organized in 1805.

Named for the river that flows through it, it is one of three Mad River townships statewide. The other townships of this name are located in Clark and Montgomery counties.

== Government ==
The township is governed by a three-member board of trustees, who are elected in November of odd-numbered years to a four-year term beginning on the following January 1. Two are elected in the year after the presidential election and one is elected in the year before it. There is also an elected township fiscal officer, who serves a four-year term beginning on April 1 of the year after the election, which is held in November of the year before the presidential election. Vacancies in the fiscal officership or on the board of trustees are filled by the remaining trustees.
