= Park Layne, Ohio =

- Census-designated place
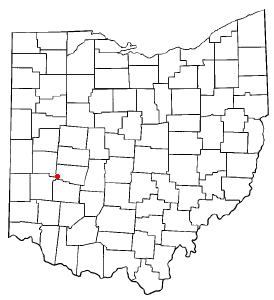
- Location of Park Layne in Ohio
- Coordinates: 39°53′17″N 84°02′22″W
- Country: United States
- State: Ohio
- County: Clark
- Township: Bethel

Area
  - Total: 1.46 sq mi (3.79 km^{2})
  - Land: 1.46 sq mi (3.79 km^{2})
  - Water: 0 sq mi (0.00 km^{2})
- Elevation: 840 ft (260 m)

Population (2020)
  - Total: 4,248
  - Density: 2,900.8/sq mi (1,119.99/km^{2})
- Time zone: UTC-5 (Eastern (EST))
  - Summer (DST): UTC-4 (EDT)
- FIPS code: 39-59920
- GNIS feature ID: 2393177

Park Layne is a census-designated place (CDP) in Bethel Township, Clark County, Ohio, United States. The population of the CDP was 4,248 at the 2020 census. It is part of the Springfield, Ohio Metropolitan Statistical Area. Park Layne became a CDP in the 1980 United States census.

On May 24, 2017, an EF1 tornado touched down and caused damage to several businesses in the community.

== Geography ==
Park Layne is located in southwestern Clark County on the western edge of Bethel Township. It is bordered to the east by the census-designated place (CDP) Crystal Lakes and to the west by Bethel Township in Miami County. Park Layne Elementary School is located in the northwest corner of the CDP.

Ohio State Route 235 (South Dayton-Lakeview Road) passes through the community, leading north 3.5 miles (5.6 km) to New Carlisle and south 1.5 miles (2.4 km) to Interstate 70 at Exit 41. Downtown Dayton is 14 miles (23 km) southwest of Park Layne.

According to the United States Census Bureau, the CDP has a total area of 1.5 square miles (3.8 km^{2}), all of it land.

== Demographics ==
Historical population
Census	Pop.	Note	%±
1980	5,372		—
1990	4,795		−10.7%
2000	4,519		−5.8%
2010	4,343		−3.9%
2020	4,248		−2.2%
U.S. Decennial Census

=== 2020 census ===
As of the 2020 census, Park Layne had a population of 4,248. The median age was 35.0 years. 26.9% of residents were under the age of 18 and 12.9% were 65 years of age or older. For every 100 females there were 95.1 males, and for every 100 females age 18 and over there were 91.3 males age 18 and over.

100.0% of residents lived in urban areas, while 0.0% lived in rural areas.

There were 1,605 households in Park Layne, of which 34.4% had children under the age of 18 living in them. Of all households, 42.5% were married-couple households, 18.4% were households with a male householder and no spouse or partner present, and 27.9% were households with a female householder and no spouse or partner present. About 24.8% of all households were made up of individuals and 10.3% had someone living alone who was 65 years of age or older.

There were 1,656 housing units, of which 3.1% were vacant. The homeowner vacancy rate was 0.7% and the rental vacancy rate was 4.7%. The population density was 2,832 inhabitants per square mile (1,093.4/km^{2}), and housing density was 1,104 per square mile (426.3/km^{2}).

Racial composition as of the 2020 census
Race	Number	Percent
White	3,695	87.0%
Black or African American	44	1.0%
American Indian and Alaska Native	16	0.4%
Asian	23	0.5%
Native Hawaiian and Other Pacific Islander	5	0.1%
Some other race	193	4.5%
Two or more races	272	6.4%
Hispanic or Latino (of any race)	381	9.0%

=== Households and housing ===
In 2020 American Community Survey estimates, there were 1,342 families in the CDP, and the average household size was 2.57 while the average family size was 2.83.

=== Income and poverty ===
The median income for a household in the CDP was $52,726, and the median income for a family was $53,974. 15.2% of the population were below the poverty line, including 21.8% of those under age 18 and 8.2% of those age 65 or over.

=== Education ===
87.2% of the population over the age of 25 had obtained a high school diploma or equivalency, and 7.4% of those over the age of 25 held bachelor's degrees.

=== 2010 census ===
As of the census of 2010, there were 4,323 people, 1,551 households, and 1,194 families living in the CDP. The population density was 2,882 inhabitants per square mile (1,112.7/km^{2}). There were 1,654 housing units at an average density of 1,102 per square mile (425.5/km^{2}). The racial makeup of the city was 94.5% White, 0.6% African American, 0.3% Native American, 0.3% Asian, 2.1% from other races, and 1.9% from two or more races. Hispanic or Latino of any race were 4.1% of the population.

There were 1,551 households, of which 40.7% had children under the age of 18 living with them, 59.5% were married couples living together, 11.2% had a female householder with no husband present, 6.1% had a male householder with no wife present, and 23% were non-families. 17.2% of all households were made up of individuals, and 8.7% had someone living alone who was 65 years of age or older. The average household size was 2.90 and the average family size was 3.26.

The median age in the CDP was 35.1 years. 17.1% of residents were under the age of 18; 12.3% were between the ages of 18 and 24; 27.8% were from 25 to 44; 23.2% were from 45 to 64; and 10.6% were 65 years of age or older. The gender makeup of the city was 50.5% male and 50.1% female.

The median income for a household in the CDP was $48,008, and the median income for a family was $50,000. 16.2% of the population were below the poverty line, including 32% of those under age 18 and 9.2% of those age 65 or over. 42.5% of the population over the age of 25 had obtained a high school diploma or equivalency, 3% of those over the age of 25 held bachelor's degrees.

=== 2000 census ===
As of the census of 2000, there were 4,519 people, 1,588 households, and 1,259 families residing in the CDP. The population density was 3,036.5 inhabitants per square mile (1,172.4/km^{2}). There were 1,644 housing units at an average density of 1,104.7 per square mile (426.5/km^{2}). The racial makeup of the CDP was 96.59% White, 0.46% African American, 0.38% Native American, 0.27% Asian, 0.38% from other races, and 1.93% from two or more races. Hispanic or Latino of any race were 1.46% of the population.

There were 1,588 households, out of which 41.5% had children under the age of 18 living with them, 57.5% were married couples living together, 15.2% had a female householder with no husband present, and 20.7% were non-families. 17.5% of all households were made up of individuals, and 6.0% had someone living alone who was 65 years of age or older. The average household size was 2.85 and the average family size was 3.17.

In the CDP the population was spread out, with 30.4% under the age of 18, 9.9% from 18 to 24, 30.5% from 25 to 44, 20.6% from 45 to 64, and 8.7% who were 65 years of age or older. The median age was 32 years. For every 100 females there were 95.8 males. For every 100 females age 18 and over, there were 92.2 males.

The median income for a household in the CDP was $38,699, and the median income for a family was $40,000. Males had a median income of $35,264 versus $23,333 for females. The per capita income for the CDP was $15,244. About 6.2% of families and 6.6% of the population were below the poverty line, including 5.9% of those under age 18 and 7.4% of those age 65 or over.

== Education ==
Park Layne is in the Tecumseh Local School District, formerly known as New Carlisle-Bethel Local District prior to fall of 1989.
