= Bethel Township, Clark County, Ohio =

Township in Ohio, US

- Township
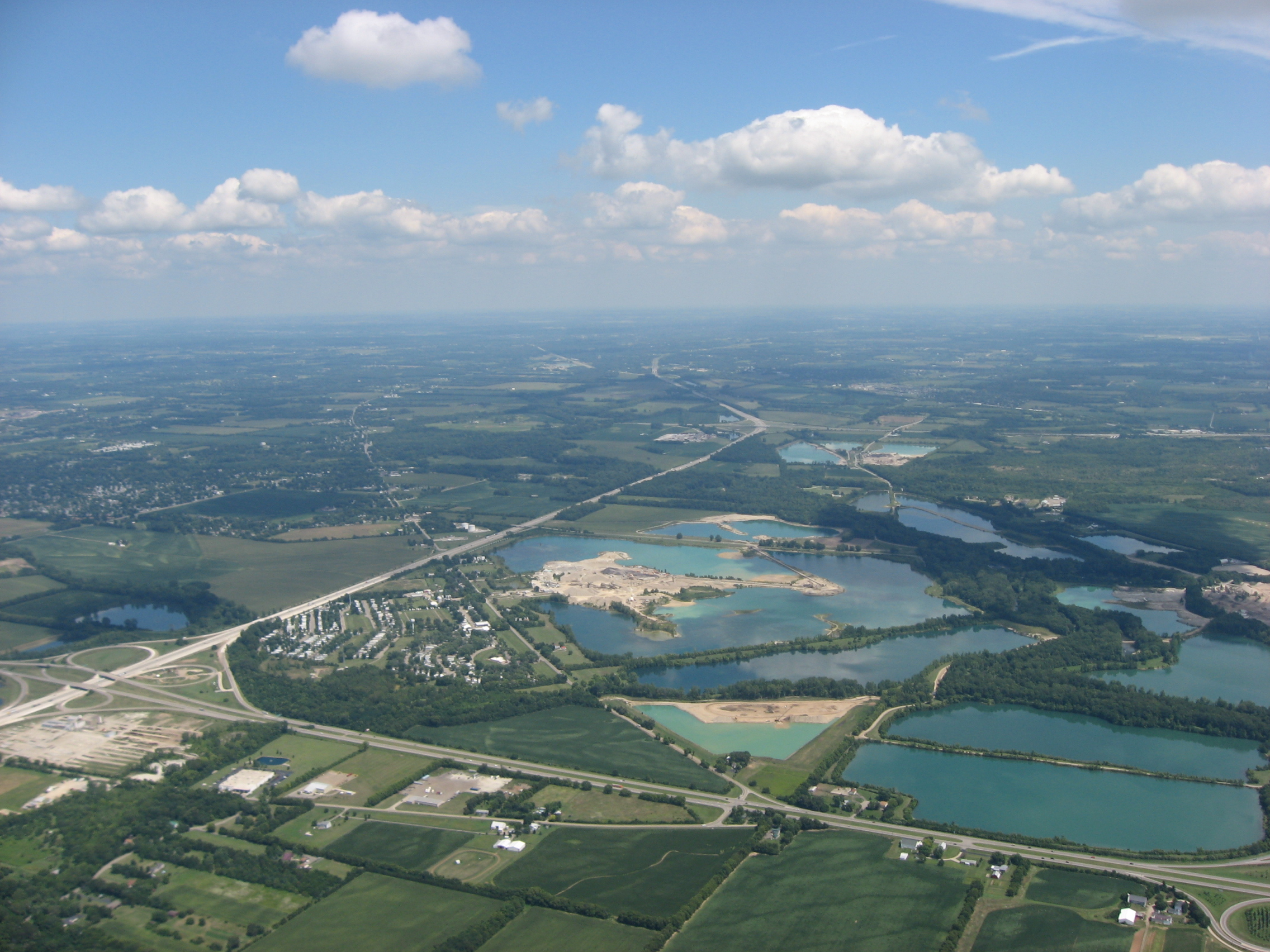
- Lakes in southwestern Bethel Township

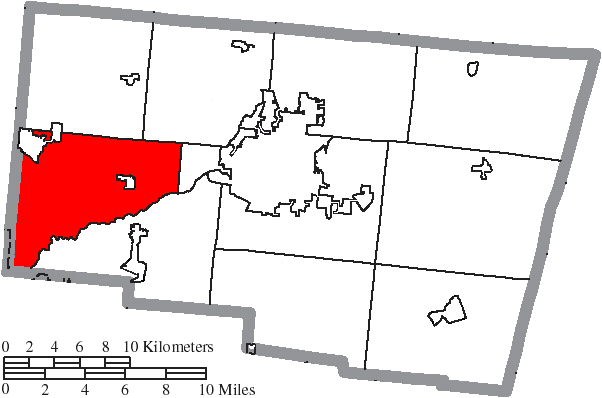
- Location of Bethel Township in Clark County
- Coordinates: 39°54′24″N 84°0′55″W
- Country: United States
- State: Ohio
- County: Clark

Area
  - Total: 38.1 sq mi (98.7 km^{2})
  - Land: 37.6 sq mi (97.4 km^{2})
  - Water: 0.50 sq mi (1.3 km^{2})
- Elevation: 876 ft (267 m)

Population (2020)
  - Total: 18,050
  - Density: 480/sq mi (185/km^{2})
- Time zone: UTC-5 (Eastern (EST))
  - Summer (DST): UTC-4 (EDT)
- FIPS code: 39-06054
- GNIS feature ID: 1085850
- Website: www.betheltownshipclark.org

Bethel Township is one of the ten townships of Clark County, Ohio, United States. The 2020 census reported 18,050 people living in the township.

== Geography ==
Located in the southwestern corner of the county, it borders the following townships and city:

- Pike Township - north
- German Township - northeast
- Springfield Township - east
- Mad River Township - southeast
- Bath Township, Greene County - south
- Huber Heights - southwest
- Bethel Township, Miami County - west

It is the only township in the county with a border on Montgomery County. The Mad River, a southwest-flowing tributary of the Great Miami River, forms the southeast border of the township.

Several populated places are located in Bethel Township:

- Crystal Lakes, a census-designated place in the southwestern part of the township
- Donnelsville, a village in the eastern part of the township
- New Carlisle, a city in the northwestern corner of the township
- Park Layne, a census-designated place in the southwestern part of the township
- Medway, a census-designated place east of Park Layne

== Name and history ==
Statewide, other Bethel Townships are located in Miami and Monroe counties.

== Government ==
The township is governed by a three-member board of trustees, who are elected in November of odd-numbered years to a four-year term beginning on the following January 1. Two are elected in the year after the presidential election and one is elected in the year before it. There is also an elected township fiscal officer, who serves a four-year term beginning on April 1 of the year after the election, which is held in November of the year before the presidential election. Vacancies in the fiscal officership or on the board of trustees are filled by the remaining trustees.

The board is composed of Chris Crowley (chairman), Alec R. Ashbaugh, and Nancy Brown. The fiscal officer is Stacey McKenzie.
