= Donnelsville, Ohio =

- Village
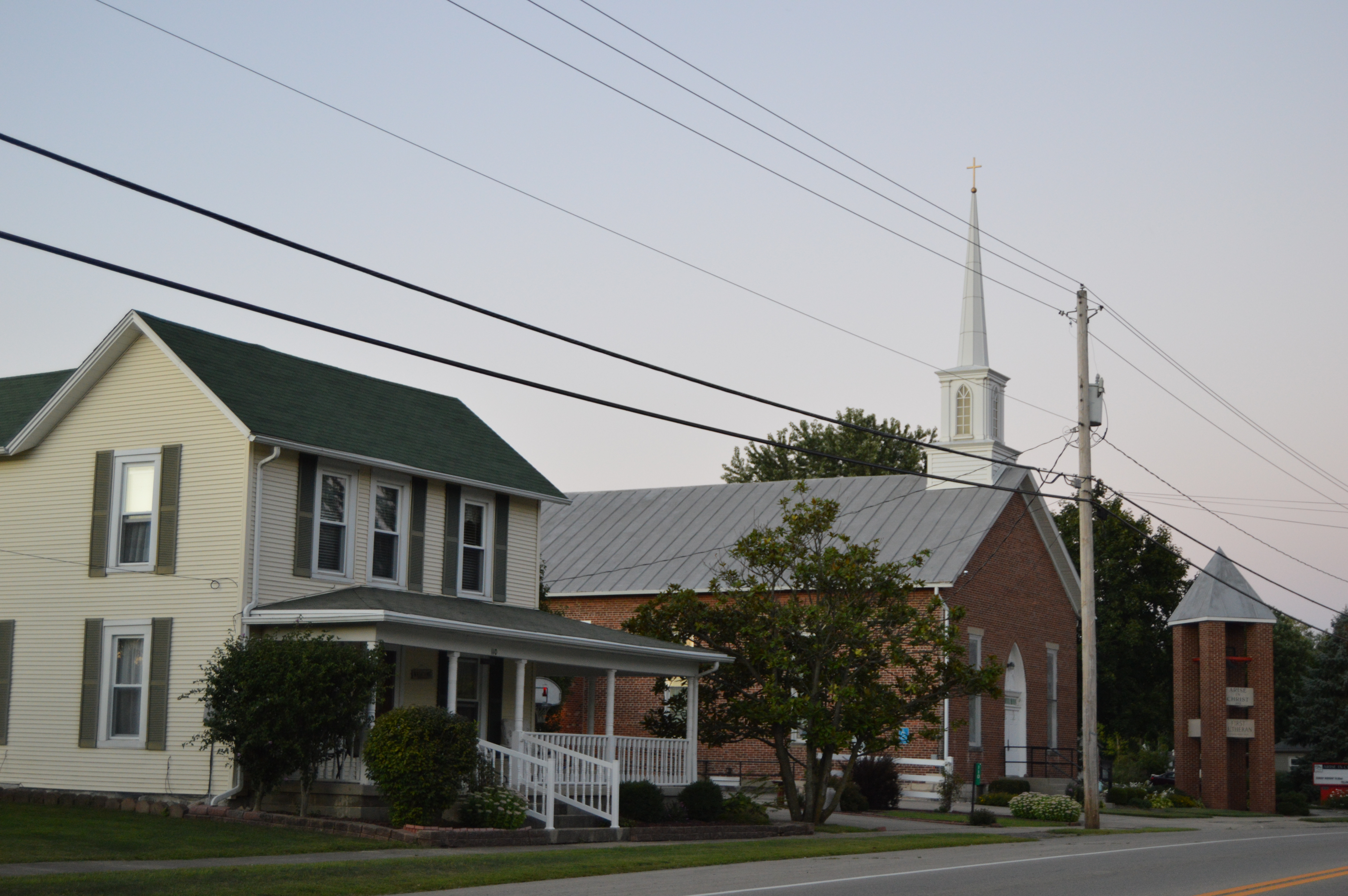
- House and church on Main Street

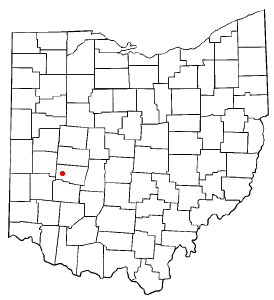
- Location of Donnelsville, Ohio

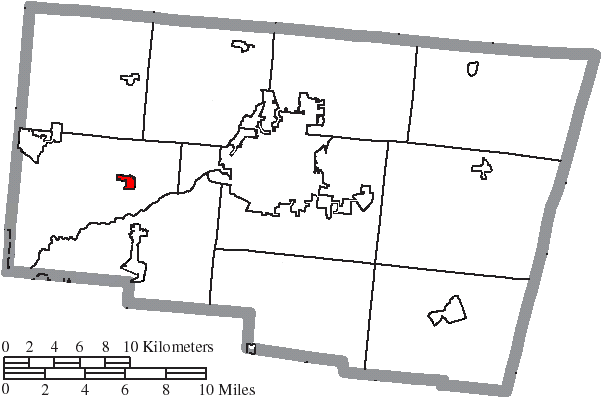
- Location of Donnelsville in Clark County
- Coordinates: 39°54′55″N 83°56′35″W
- Country: United States
- State: Ohio
- County: Clark
- Township: Bethel
- Platted: 1830; 196 years ago

Area
  - Total: 0.32 sq mi (0.82 km^{2})
  - Land: 0.32 sq mi (0.82 km^{2})
  - Water: 0 sq mi (0.00 km^{2})
- Elevation: 958 ft (292 m)

Population (2020)
  - Total: 255
  - Estimate (2023): 255
  - Density: 803.1/sq mi (310.07/km^{2})
- Time zone: UTC-5 (Eastern (EST))
  - Summer (DST): UTC-4 (EDT)
- ZIP code: 45319
- Area codes: 937, 326
- FIPS code: 39-22288
- GNIS feature ID: 2398738
- Website: https://villageofdonnelsville.org/

Donnelsville is a village in Clark County, Ohio, United States. The population was 255 at the 2020 census. It is part of the Springfield, Ohio Metropolitan Statistical Area.

== History ==
Donnelsville was platted in 1830 by James Donnel, and named for him. A post office called Donnelsville was established in 1840.

== Geography ==
According to the United States Census Bureau, the village has a total area of 0.39 square miles (1.01 km^{2}), all of it land.

== Demographics ==
Historical population
Census	Pop.	Note	%±
1850	196		—
1860	233		18.9%
1880	194		—
1890	243		25.3%
1900	200		−17.7%
1910	202		1.0%
1920	166		−17.8%
1930	210		26.5%
1940	254		21.0%
1950	285		12.2%
1960	273		−4.2%
1970	278		1.8%
1980	219		−21.2%
1990	276		26.0%
2000	293		6.2%
2010	304		3.8%
2020	255		−16.1%
2023 (est.)	255	Steady	0.0%
U.S. Decennial Census

=== 2010 census ===
As of the census of 2010, there were 304 people, 114 households, and 84 families living in the village. The population density was 779.5 inhabitants per square mile (301.0/km^{2}). There were 133 housing units at an average density of 341.0 per square mile (131.7/km^{2}). The racial makeup of the village was 98.7% White, 0.3% Native American, 0.3% Asian, 0.3% from other races, and 0.3% from two or more races. Hispanic or Latino of any race were 0.3% of the population.

There were 114 households, of which 37.7% had children under the age of 18 living with them, 57.0% were married couples living together, 11.4% had a female householder with no husband present, 5.3% had a male householder with no wife present, and 26.3% were non-families. 21.9% of all households were made up of individuals, and 8.7% had someone living alone who was 65 years of age or older. The average household size was 2.67 and the average family size was 3.14.

The median age in the village was 39.3 years. 28.9% of residents were under the age of 18; 5.4% were between the ages of 18 and 24; 24.3% were from 25 to 44; 33% were from 45 to 64; and 8.6% were 65 years of age or older. The gender makeup of the village was 50.7% male and 49.3% female.

=== 2000 census ===
As of the census of 2000, there were 293 people, 98 households, and 81 families living in the village. The population density was 756.0 inhabitants per square mile (291.9/km^{2}). There were 109 housing units at an average density of 281.3 per square mile (108.6/km^{2}). The racial makeup of the village was 96.25% White, 0.34% African American, 0.34% Pacific Islander, 2.05% from other races, and 1.02% from two or more races. Hispanic or Latino of any race were 2.39% of the population.

There were 98 households, out of which 49.0% had children under the age of 18 living with them, 64.3% were married couples living together, 12.2% had a female householder with no husband present, and 17.3% were non-families. 13.3% of all households were made up of individuals, and 4.1% had someone living alone who was 65 years of age or older. The average household size was 2.99 and the average family size was 3.25.

In the village, the population was spread out, with 32.4% under the age of 18, 8.2% from 18 to 24, 30.7% from 25 to 44, 20.8% from 45 to 64, and 7.8% who were 65 years of age or older. The median age was 32 years. For every 100 females there were 107.8 males. For every 100 females age 18 and over, there were 120.0 males.

The median income for a household in the village was $63,125, and the median income for a family was $66,389. Males had a median income of $45,000 versus $47,750 for females. The per capita income for the village was $21,104. About 4.5% of families and 9.5% of the population were below the poverty line, including 15.3% of those under the age of eighteen and none of those 65 or over.

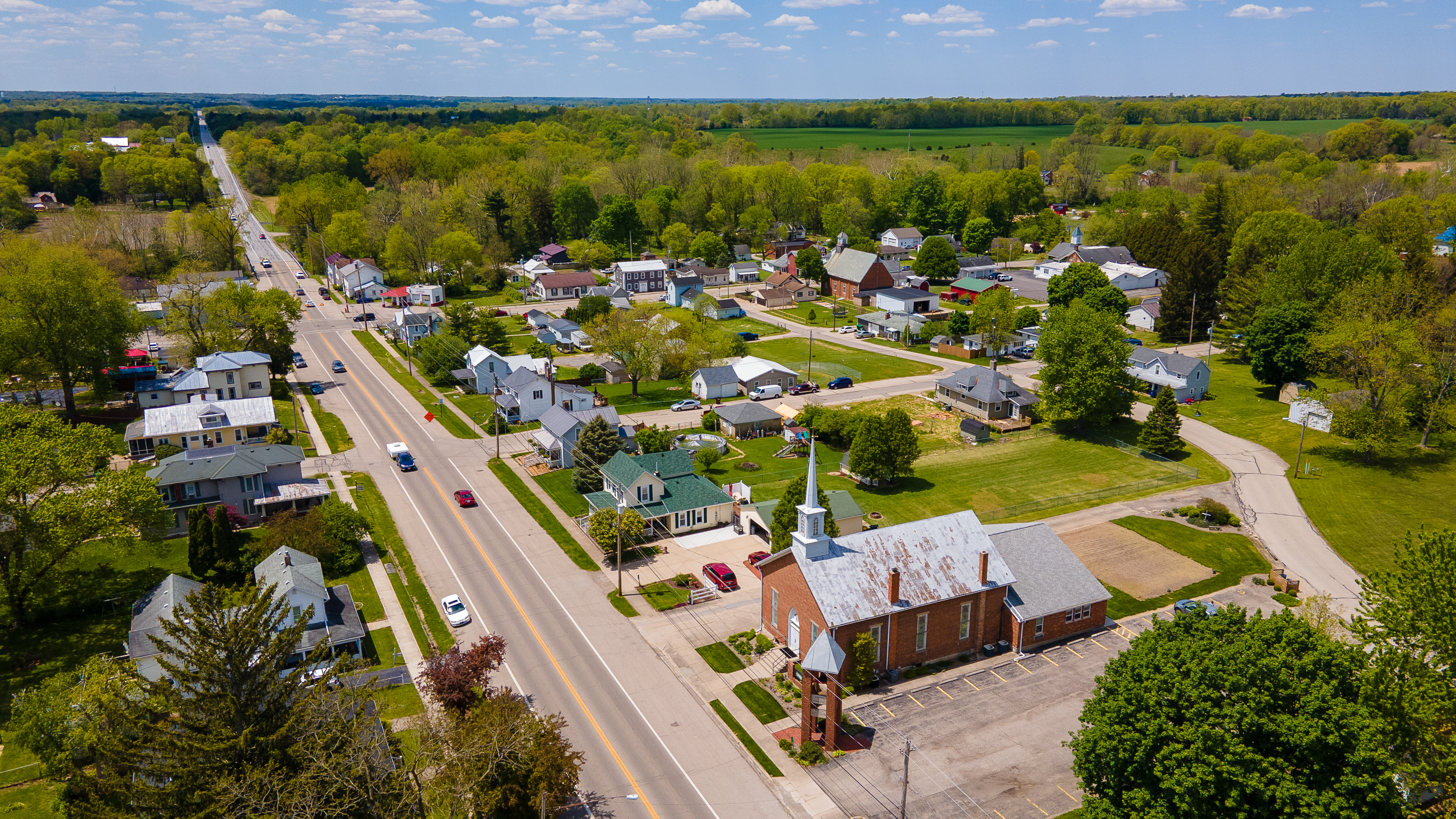
Donnelsville, 2021
