= New Carlisle, Ohio =

- City
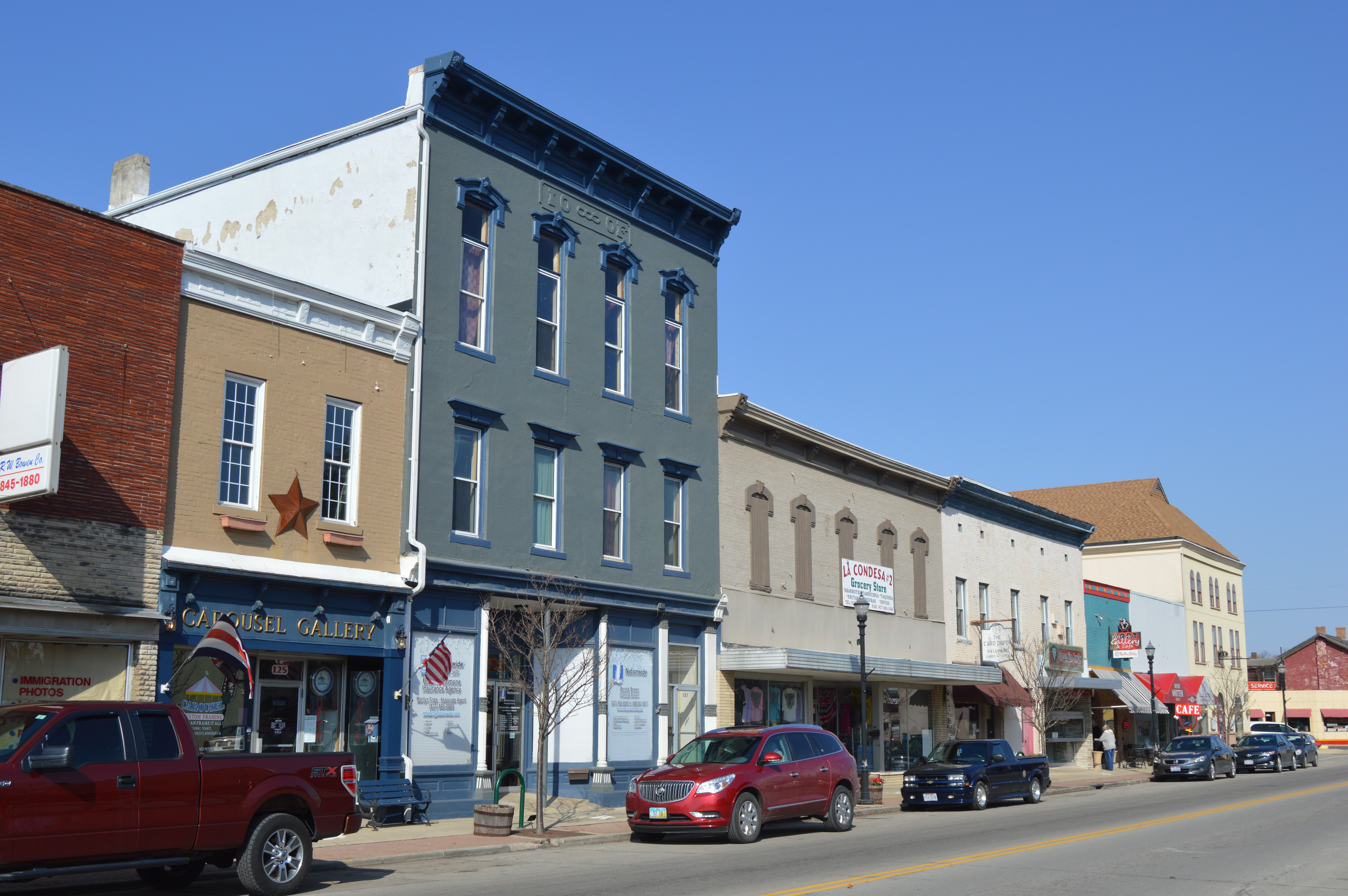
- Main Street downtown

- Seal

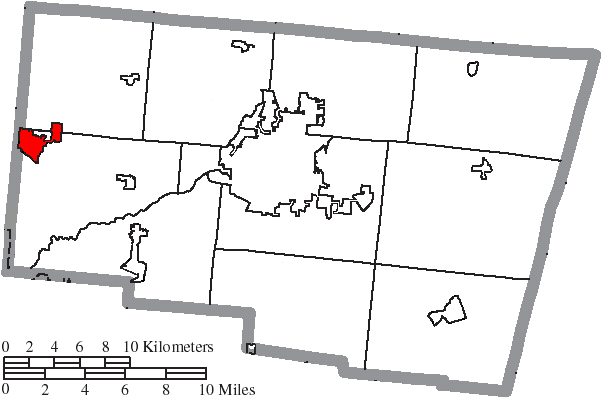
- Location of New Carlisle in Clark County

- Location within Ohio Location within the United States
- Coordinates: 39°56′41″N 84°01′32″W
- Country: United States
- State: Ohio
- County: Clark
- Township: Bethel

Area
  - Total: 2.71 sq mi (7.01 km^{2})
  - Land: 2.68 sq mi (6.95 km^{2})
  - Water: 0.027 sq mi (0.07 km^{2})
- Elevation: 909 ft (277 m)

Population (2020)
  - Total: 5,559
  - Density: 2,072.4/sq mi (800.14/km^{2})
- Time zone: UTC-5 (Eastern (EST))
  - Summer (DST): UTC-4 (EDT)
- ZIP code: 45344
- Area codes: 937, 326
- FIPS code: 39-54334
- GNIS feature ID: 2395190
- Website: https://newcarlisleohio.gov/

New Carlisle (/ˈnuː kɑːrˈlaɪəl/ NEW kar-LY-əl) is a city in Clark County, Ohio, United States. The population was 5,559 at the 2020 census. It is part of the Springfield, Ohio metropolitan area.

== History ==
New Carlisle was originally called Monroe, and under the latter name was laid out in 1810. The present name is a transfer from Carlisle, Pennsylvania, the birthplace of some of the first settlers. A post office called New Carlisle has been in operation since 1828. New Carlisle was incorporated as a village in 1831.

On June 21, 1933, the infamous John Dillinger committed his first bank robbery, taking $10,000 from the New Carlisle National Bank, which occupied the building which still stands at the southeast corner of Main Street and Jefferson Street (state routes 235 and 571) in New Carlisle.

New Carlisle was incorporated as a city in 1973.

== Geography ==
According to the United States Census Bureau, the city has a total area of 2.76 square miles (7.15 km^{2}), of which, 2.74 square miles (7.10 km^{2}) is land and 0.02 square miles (0.05 km^{2}) is water.

The census-designated places of Park Layne and Crystal Lakes are to the South of New Carlisle.

=== Climate ===
New Carlisle, Ohio, experiences a humid continental climate (Köppen classification Dfa), characterized by four distinct seasons: hot summers, cold winters, and transitional spring and fall periods. The city is located in the Midwest, which means it can be subject to varying weather patterns influenced by both the Great Lakes and the continental interior of the United States.

Summers in New Carlisle are typically warm, with average high temperatures ranging from the mid-80s°F (29–30 °C) in June, July, and August. Humidity levels can be high, making the heat feel more intense, though occasional thunderstorms bring some relief. Winters, on the other hand, can be quite cold, with average low temperatures dropping to the mid-20s°F (-3 to -4 °C) in January. Snowfall is common during the winter months, with the region receiving an average of around 20–30 inches (50–76 cm) of snow annually. Spring and fall are more moderate, with mild temperatures and a mix of sunny and rainy days. The area can also be susceptible to severe weather, including thunderstorms and tornadoes, especially in the spring and early summer months, due to its location in the "Tornado Alley" of the Midwest.

Climate data for New Carlisle, Ohio (1991–2020)
Month	Jan	Feb	Mar	Apr	May	Jun	Jul	Aug	Sep	Oct	Nov	Dec	Year
Mean daily maximum °F (°C)	37.7 (3.2)	41.3 (5.2)	51.7 (10.9)	63.7 (17.6)	74.1 (23.4)	82.5 (28.1)	85.5 (29.7)	84.4 (29.1)	78.4 (25.8)	66.3 (19.1)	53.2 (11.8)	41.7 (5.4)	63.4 (17.4)
Daily mean °F (°C)	27.3 (−2.6)	30.9 (−0.6)	40.3 (4.6)	51.0 (10.6)	61.4 (16.3)	70.6 (21.4)	73.8 (23.2)	72.2 (22.3)	66.0 (18.9)	54.1 (12.3)	42.7 (5.9)	32.8 (0.4)	51.9 (11.1)
Mean daily minimum °F (°C)	16.9 (−8.4)	20.4 (−6.4)	28.9 (−1.7)	38.2 (3.4)	48.7 (9.3)	58.6 (14.8)	62.1 (16.7)	60.0 (15.6)	53.5 (11.9)	41.9 (5.5)	32.1 (0.1)	23.8 (−4.6)	40.4 (4.7)
Average precipitation inches (mm)	3.16 (80)	2.42 (61)	3.32 (84)	4.25 (108)	4.52 (115)	4.36 (111)	4.46 (113)	3.11 (79)	3.21 (82)	2.89 (73)	3.07 (78)	3.11 (79)	41.88 (1,063)
Average snowfall inches (cm)	6.2 (16)	5.3 (13)	3.0 (7.6)	0.1 (0.25)	0.0 (0.0)	0.0 (0.0)	0.0 (0.0)	0.0 (0.0)	0.0 (0.0)	0.0 (0.0)	0.4 (1.0)	3.7 (9.4)	18.7 (47.25)
Source: NOAA

== Demographics ==
Historical population
Census	Pop.	Note	%±
1830	343		—
1850	634		—
1860	802		26.5%
1880	818		—
1890	958		17.1%
1900	995		3.9%
1910	1,058		6.3%
1920	1,019		−3.7%
1930	1,089		6.9%
1940	1,237		13.6%
1950	1,640		32.6%
1960	4,107		150.4%
1970	6,112		48.8%
1980	6,498		6.3%
1990	6,049		−6.9%
2000	5,735		−5.2%
2010	5,785		0.9%
2020	5,559		−3.9%
2023 (est.)	5,494		−1.2%

=== 2020 census ===
As of the 2020 census, New Carlisle had a population of 5,559 and a population density of 2,071.2 inhabitants per square mile (799.7/km^{2}).

The median age was 37.4 years; 24.7% of residents were under the age of 18, 9.2% were between the ages of 18 and 24, 28.3% were from 25 to 44, 21.5% were from 45 to 64, and 17.7% were 65 years of age or older. For every 100 females there were 94.7 males, and for every 100 females age 18 and over there were 93.5 males age 18 and over.

98.6% of residents lived in urban areas, while 1.4% lived in rural areas.

There were 2,223 households in New Carlisle, of which 32.6% had children under the age of 18 living in them. Of all households, 43.0% were married-couple households, 19.5% were households with a male householder and no spouse or partner present, and 28.3% were households with a female householder and no spouse or partner present. About 30.3% of all households were made up of individuals and 14.8% had someone living alone who was 65 years of age or older.

There were 2,365 housing units, of which 6.0% were vacant. The homeowner vacancy rate was 1.3% and the rental vacancy rate was 7.1%.

Racial composition as of the 2020 census
Race	Number	Percent
White	4,739	85.2%
Black or African American	21	0.4%
American Indian and Alaska Native	33	0.6%
Asian	26	0.5%
Native Hawaiian and Other Pacific Islander	2	0.0%
Some other race	324	5.8%
Two or more races	414	7.4%
Hispanic or Latino (of any race)	643	11.6%

The median income for a household in the city was $42,696, and the median income for a family was $50,727. 26.8% of the population were below the poverty line, including 26.4% of those under age 18 and 9.4% of those age 65 or over.

The labor force participation rate for those aged 20 to 64 was 73.3%. 82.1% of the population over the age of 25 had obtained a high school diploma or equivalency, and 17.7% of those over the age of 25 held bachelor's degrees.

=== 2010 census ===
As of the 2010 census there were 5,785 people, 2,214 households, and 1,489 families living in the city. The population density was 2,111.3 inhabitants per square mile (815.2/km^{2}). There were 2,389 housing units at an average density of 871.9 per square mile (336.6/km^{2}). The racial makeup of the city was 90.1% White, 0.5% African American, 0.1% Native American, 0.4% Asian, 7.6% from other races, and 1.3% from two or more races. Hispanic or Latino of any race were 11.3% of the population.

There were 2,214 households, of which 35.7% had children under the age of 18 living with them, 48.1% were married couples living together, 14.1% had a female householder with no husband present, 5.0% had a male householder with no wife present, and 32.7% were non-families. 27.6% of all households were made up of individuals, and 14% had someone living alone who was 65 years of age or older. The average household size was 2.58 and the average family size was 3.12.

The median age in the city was 33.5 years. 25.6% of residents were under the age of 18; 8.9% were between the ages of 18 and 24; 28.5% were from 25 to 44; 24.3% were from 45 to 64; and 14.7% were 65 years of age or older. The gender makeup of the city was 47.7% male and 52.3% female.

=== 2000 census ===
As of the 2000 census there were 5,735 people, 2,207 households, and 1,551 families living in the city. The population density was 2,968.2 inhabitants per square mile (1,146.0/km^{2}). There were 2,286 housing units at an average density of 1,183.1 per square mile (456.8/km^{2}). The racial makeup of the city was 95.40% White, 0.33% African American, 0.26% Native American, 0.35% Asian, 0.02% Pacific Islander, 0.77% from other races, and 0.19% from two or more races. Hispanic or Latino of any race were 2.74% of the population.

There were 2,207 households, out of which 33.6% had children under the age of 18 living with them, 52.7% were married couples living together, 12.7% had a female householder with no husband present, and 29.7% were non-families. 26.8% of all households were made up of individuals, and 13.1% had someone living alone who was 65 years of age or older. The average household size was 2.56 and the average family size was 3.09.

In the city the population was spread out, with 27.1% under the age of 18, 8.4% from 18 to 24, 29.5% from 25 to 44, 20.2% from 45 to 64, and 14.8% who were 65 years of age or older. The median age was 35 years. For every 100 females, there were 89.4 males. For every 100 females age 18 and over, there were 84.6 males.

The median income for a household in the city was $39,081, and the median income for a family was $43,320. Males had a median income of $33,413 versus $21,449 for females. The per capita income for the city was $16,490. About 9.4% of families and 11.5% of the population were below the poverty line, including 17.4% of those under age 18 and 9.0% of those age 65 or over.

== Government ==
New Carlisle is governed by a council–manager form of government. It consists of a seven-member council, with elections held at-large every four years. Two members will then be elected as Mayor and Vice Mayor by the council itself. The Mayor of New Carlisle is the "ceremonial and representative head of the city, but shall exercise no administrative authority". The Mayor's duties primarily entails responsibility for presiding at City Council meetings, representing the City at local events, and other ceremonial duties. Additionally, the Mayor presides over the Mayor's Court. City council members do not have term limits. However, a council member may not be elected the Mayor or Vice Mayor for more than two consecutive terms.

The City Manager is appointed by the City Council and serves as the chief administrative officer of the City according to the city's charter. The City Manager provides for the overall management direction and oversight of the City organization and is responsible for its efficient and effective operation in accordance with the policies, programs and regulations established by the City Council. This includes: annual budgeting, appointment and suspension of city employees, inventory of all City properties and holdings, and the administration of all city departments.

== Education ==
New Carlisle is in the Tecumseh Local School District, formerly known as New Carlisle-Bethel Local District prior to fall of 1989. Part of New Carlisle is still annexed to Bethel Local Schools in Miami County.

== Notable people ==
- Patricia Barringer – All-American Girls Professional Baseball League ballplayer.
- Jake Crist (aka John Crist) - Professional Wrestler IMPACT Wrestling
- Edward H. Funston – U.S. Representative from Kansas and Agriculture Committee chair for the Fifty-first Congress.
- General Frederick Funston – Recipient of the Medal of Honor
- Tyler Maynard – Broadway actor
- Spanky McFarland – college baseball coach at Northern Illinois and James Madison
- Roy J. Plunkett – inventor of Teflon
- John E. Reyburn (1845–1914), U.S. Congressman for Pennsylvania
