= Pike Township, Clark County, Ohio =

Township in Ohio, US

- Township
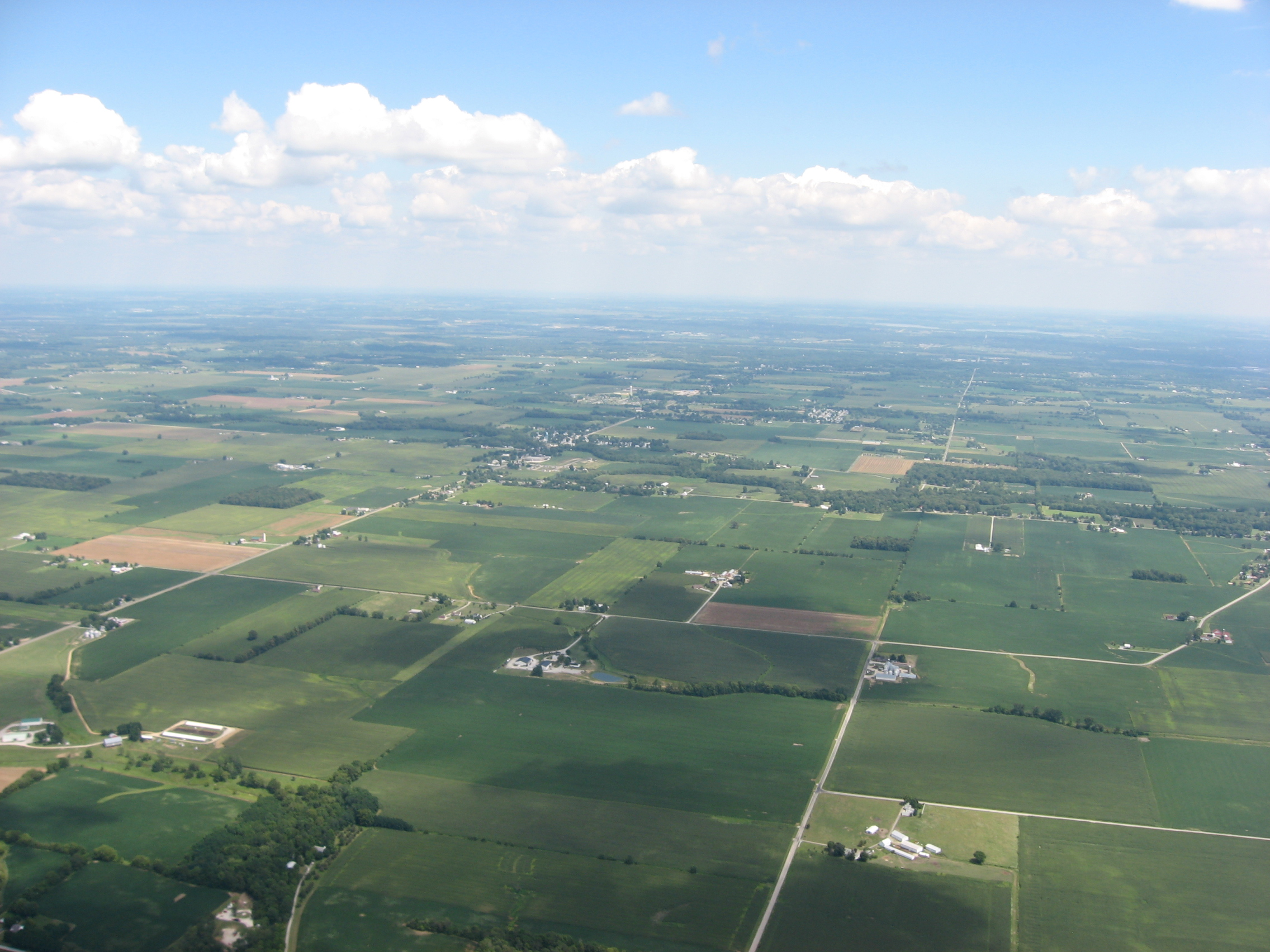
- Countryside in Pike Township

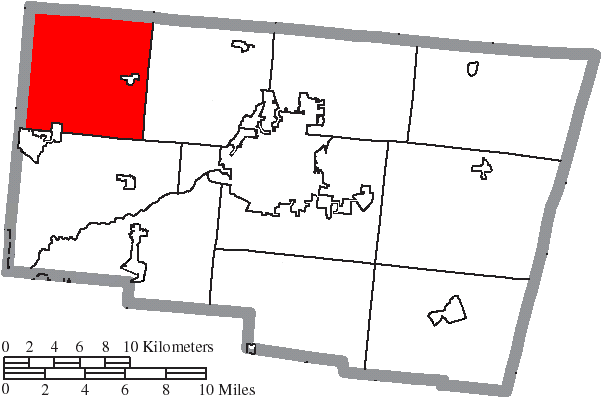
- Location of Pike Township in Clark County
- Coordinates: 39°59′19″N 83°59′21″W
- Country: United States
- State: Ohio
- County: Clark

Area
  - Total: 36.7 sq mi (95.1 km^{2})
  - Land: 36.7 sq mi (95.1 km^{2})
  - Water: 0 sq mi (0.0 km^{2})
- Elevation: 1,093 ft (333 m)

Population (2020)
  - Total: 3,733
  - Density: 102/sq mi (39.3/km^{2})
- Time zone: UTC-5 (Eastern (EST))
  - Summer (DST): UTC-4 (EDT)
- FIPS code: 39-62610
- GNIS feature ID: 1085857
- Website: http://www.piketownshipclarkcountyohio.net/

Pike Township is one of the ten townships of Clark County, Ohio, United States. The 2020 census reported 3,733 people living in the township.

== Geography ==
Located in the northwestern corner of the county, it borders the following townships:

- Jackson Township, Champaign County - north
- Mad River Township, Champaign County - northeast corner
- German Township - east
- Bethel Township - south
- Bethel Township, Miami County - southwest
- Elizabeth Township, Miami County - west
- Lostcreek Township, Miami County - northwest corner

Part of the city of New Carlisle is located in southwestern Pike Township, and the village of North Hampton is located in the east.

== Name and history ==
Pike Township was formed in 1818.

It is one of eight Pike Townships statewide.

== Government ==
The township is governed by a three-member board of trustees, who are elected in November of odd-numbered years to a four-year term beginning on the following January 1. Two are elected in the year after the presidential election and one is elected in the year before it. There is also an elected township fiscal officer, who serves a four-year term beginning on April 1 of the year after the election, which is held in November of the year before the presidential election. Vacancies in the fiscal officership or on the board of trustees are filled by the remaining trustees.
