= February 2023 North American storm complex =

Storm complex in February 2023

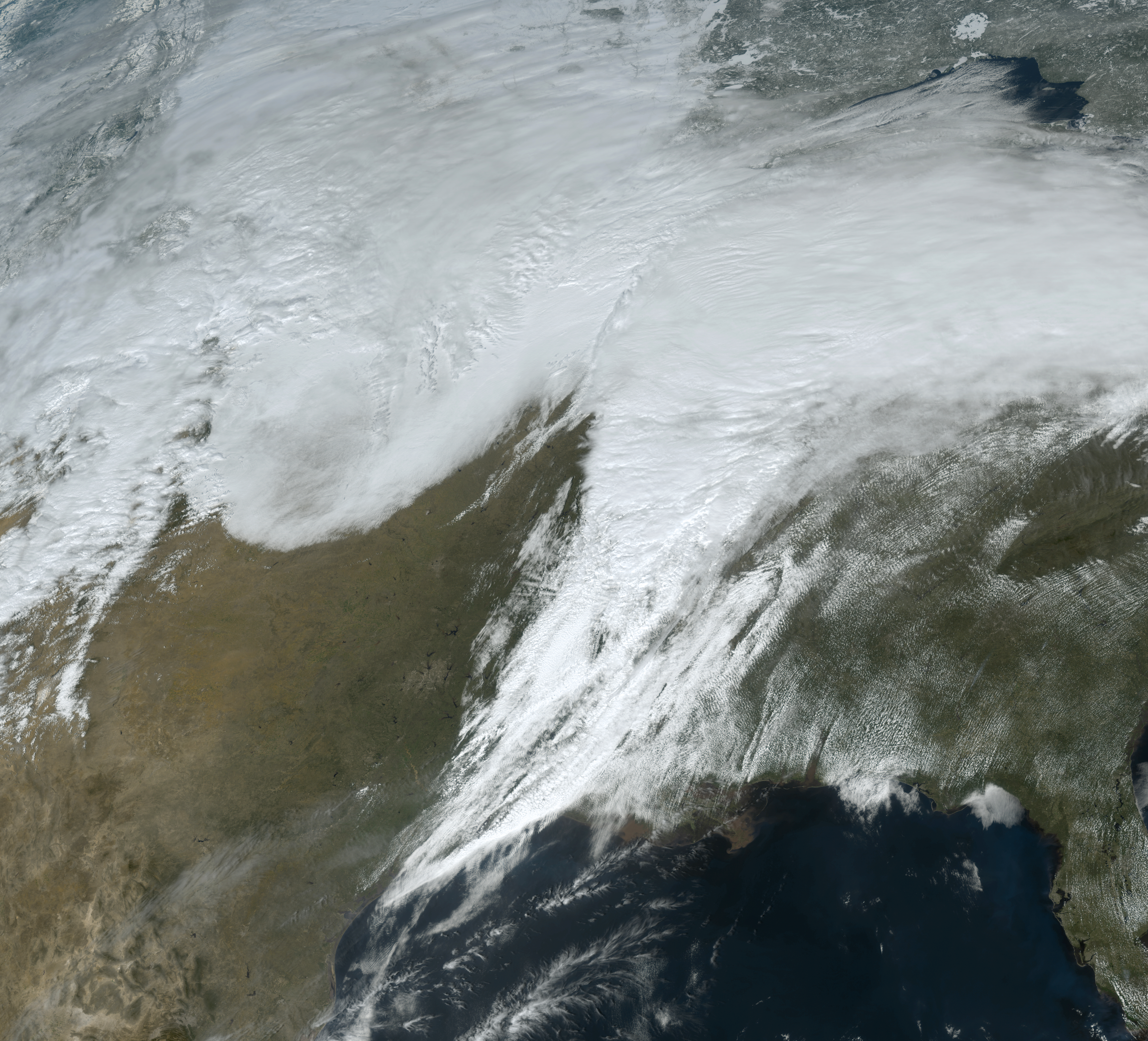
- The extratropical cyclone responsible for the initial winter storm on February 22, 2023

Meteorological history
- Formed: February 21, 2023
- Dissipated: February 28, 2023

Category 2 "Minor" winter storm
- Regional snowfall index: 4.60 (NOAA)

Tornado outbreak
- Tornadoes: 31
- Max. rating: EF2 tornado

Derecho
- Highest winds: 114 mph (183 km/h) in Memphis, Texas on February 26 (non-tornadic winds)
- Largest hail: 3.5 in (8.9 cm)

Overall effects
- Fatalities: 15 fatalities (14 non-tornadic, 1 tornadic)
- Injuries: 25+ (10+ non tornadic, 15 tornadic)
- Areas affected: Western, Southern and Midwestern United States
- Power outages: >1,200,000
- Part of the tornado outbreaks of 2023 and 2022–23 North American winter

A large and dynamic storm system bought widespread impacts across much of the United States at the end of February 2023. In the Western United States, heavy snow, hail, and gusty winds affected many areas. This led to the partial closure of several major highways, including I-205 in the Portland, Oregon metropolitan area, as well as numerous fatal accidents on other highways. Hundreds of flights were cancelled, thousands of people lost power, and multiple sporting events were postponed. In the Great Plains and Mississippi Valley, significant impacts from severe weather occurred. A severe squall line produced destructive straight-line winds in the St. Louis metropolitan area on February 23. The most impactful day in terms of severe weather was on February 26, when a powerful line of severe thunderstorms containing damaging straight-line winds and numerous embedded tornadoes impacted the Texas Panhandle, southern Kansas, and most of the state of Oklahoma. Dozens of instances of large hail, damaging wind gusts, and multiple tornadoes were confirmed with this event, including an EF2 tornado that killed a person in Cheyenne, Oklahoma. A 114 mph (183 km/h) wind gust from straight-line winds was reported in Memphis, Texas, which was the highest wind gust since the August 2020 Midwest derecho. Five of these tornadoes formed in the Oklahoma City metro area, including a high-end EF2 tornado that caused severe damage in the southeastern part of the city of Norman. The event set the record for the most tornadoes ever recorded in Oklahoma in the month of February since modern records began in 1950. More tornadoes touched down in Illinois the next day, including some in the Chicago metropolitan area. In addition to the severe weather impacts, parts of the Midwestern United States also received periods of heavy snowfall and gusty winds along with ice, causing dozens of accidents, knocking out power, and canceling hundreds of flights. The Northeastern United States was also affected by heavy snowfall.

== Meteorological synopsis ==
Map plotting the storm's track and intensity, according to the Saffir–Simpson scale Map key Saffir–Simpson scale Tropical depression (≤38 mph, ≤62 km/h) Tropical storm (39–73 mph, 63–118 km/h) Category 1 (74–95 mph, 119–153 km/h) Category 2 (96–110 mph, 154–177 km/h) Category 3 (111–129 mph, 178–208 km/h) Category 4 (130–156 mph, 209–251 km/h) Category 5 (≥157 mph, ≥252 km/h) Unknown Storm type Tropical cyclone Subtropical cyclone Extratropical cyclone, remnant low, tropical disturbance, or monsoon depression

An upper-air disturbance, combined with high-altitude cold air and low pressure, dove southeast from British Columbia into the Western United States on February 21.

== Impacts ==
Fatalities from non-tornadic effects by state
State	Fatalities	Ref.
California	1	
Colorado	3	
Michigan	1	
Missouri	1	
Nevada	5	
Oregon	2	
Vermont	1	
Total	14	

Along the path of the winter storm, countless school districts across numerous states cancelled or delayed classes. Inclement weather forced the closure of many roadways. Weather watches and warnings were issued for snowfall, freezing rain, heavy rainfall, strong winds, and extreme cold.

=== Western United States ===
Winter storm watches were hoisted for mountainous regions of the California Bay Area, the first since 2011, while only the second ever blizzard warning was issued for Los Angeles County, and the first blizzard warning ever issued by the National Weather Service of San Diego. Evacuation warnings were issued for Ventura County due to anticipated flooding and debris flows. In Arizona, American Airlines issued travel waivers for Flagstaff Pulliam Airport in anticipation of strong winds. Farther north in Oregon, the Portland Timbers of Major League Soccer postponed their opening match of the 2023 season due to the storm; it had been scheduled to take place on February 25 but was moved to February 27.

==== Oregon ====
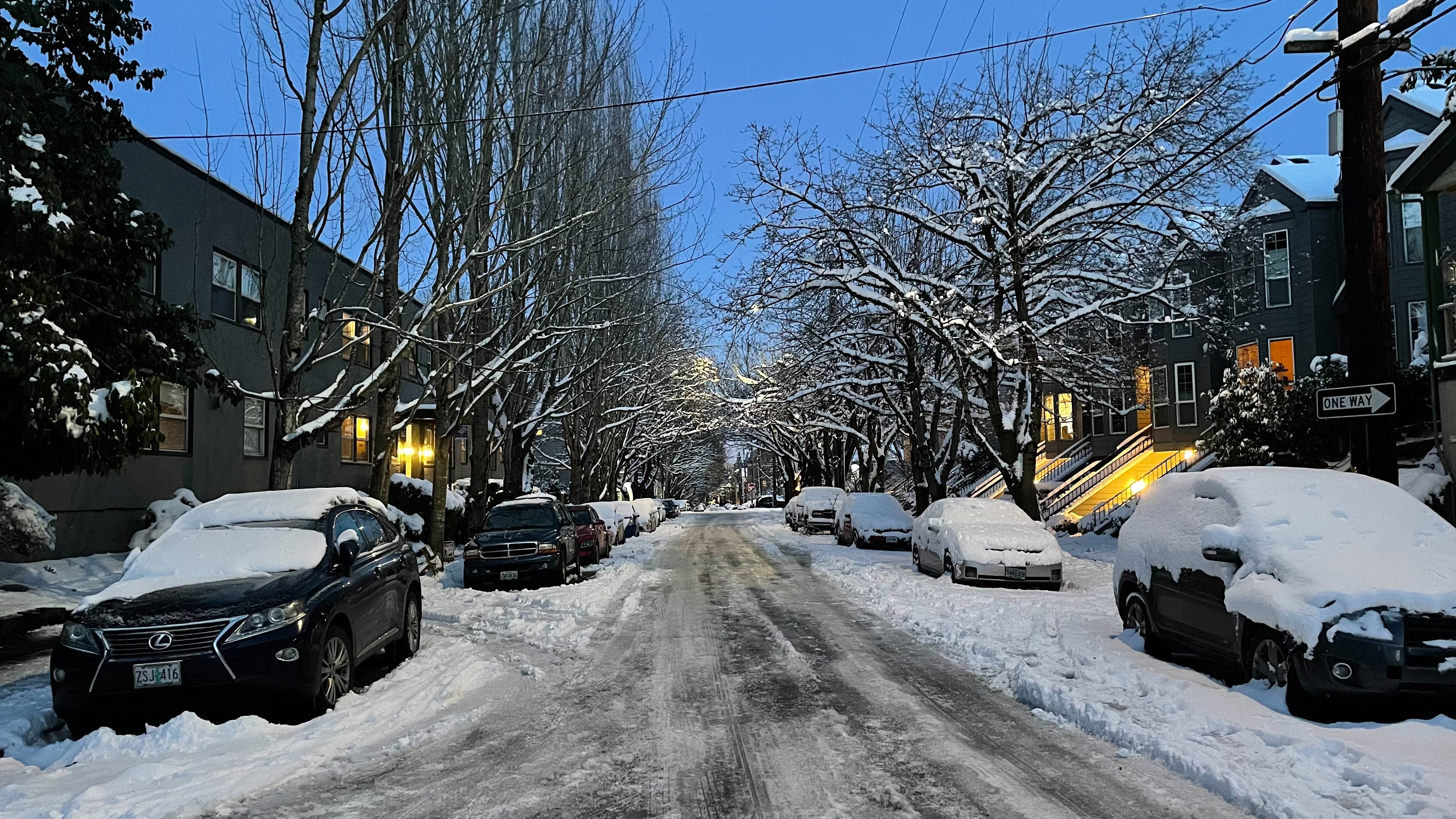
A residential street in Northwest Portland after the storm

In Oregon, snow fell in Troutdale, Tigard, Stayton, Cathedral Park, Chapman Square, and Beaverton, in which the latter received 9 inches (23 cm) of snow. Portland recorded 10.8 inches (27 cm) of snow, their largest accumulation on record so late in the winter season and the second-largest calendar day observation in the city's history. For much of the Portland metro area, the heavy snow came as a surprise with some weather models having struggled to capture eventual location of the system. On US 26 near Portland, more than 70 cars were abandoned because of the difficult driving conditions. Snow and ice led to the closure of I-205 over the Glenn L. Jackson Memorial Bridge, as well as a 2 miles (3.2 km) stretch due to stalled vehicles from high snow accumulations with several other highways closing in Oregon, including US 101 and OR 34, where downed trees blocked the routes. Around 400 flights were cancelled at Portland International Airport. Two deaths occurred in the city. Snow led to the suspension of Newport's seafood and wine festival. MAX Light Rail trains and TriMet buses were stalled, causing the delay of passengers arriving to their destinations. The inclement weather forced the closure of the City Hall in Lincoln City. At least 15,000 power outages occurred across the state, with 9,000 occurring in just the Portland, Oregon metropolitan area alone.

==== California ====
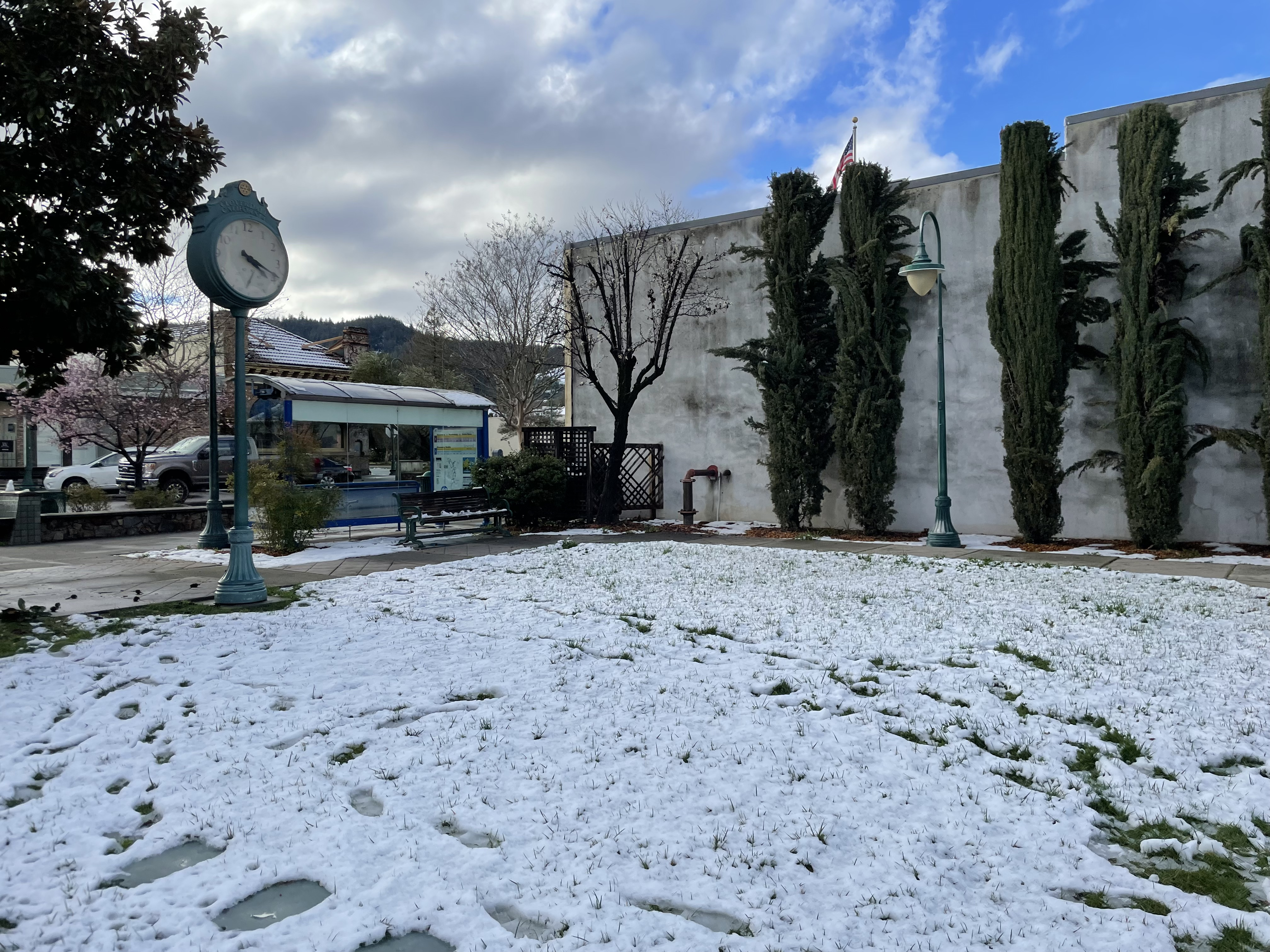
Downtown Cloverdale, CA after snowfall on February 24

In California, there were at least 172,000 power outages. Wind gusts of more than 60 miles per hour (97 km/h) were recorded, with San Francisco International Airport recording a wind gust of 68 miles per hour (109 km/h). Trees and power lines were knocked, down, including a tree which fell on several cars and an apartment building in Manhattan Beach. A tornado was also reported near Whittier on February 23. A 1-year-old was critically injured after a tree fell on top of them in Boulder Creek. For the first time in several years, hail fell on the Hollywood Sign. Cars were stranded on I-15 for several hours as snow, hail, and high winds impacted travel. There was a 20-car pileup on I-10 in Yucaipa, causing several injuries, while a 12-car pileup occurred on SR 189 near Crestline. An accident in Tujunga that left one person dead and two others injured may have been related to the storm; however, the exact cause of the accident is under investigation. Major League Soccer's 2023 season opener on February 25 at the Rose Bowl in Pasadena was rescheduled to July 4 due to the worsening weather. Snow fell at unusually low elevations across Greater Los Angeles, (including in the upper reaches of the Crescenta Valley), the High Desert, and in parts of Northern California such as Eureka, Crescent City, Ukiah, Lakeport, and Cloverdale. High seas led to the closure of the Redondo Beach pier. Los Angeles International Airport temporarily instituted a ground stop due to the thunderstorms. At Disneyland, the first performance of “Magic Happens” since 2020 was postponed due to the storm. Snowy conditions in the Bay Area also led to road closures along SR 17, SR 29, and SR 128. In the aftermath of the storm, Yosemite National Park closed and remained closed through March 17. During the storm, San Francisco fell to a record low of 39 °F (4 °C) on February 23, following a record cold high of 48 °F (9 °C) on February 22. A rain squall in Los Angeles set temperatures to 41 °F (5 °C) on February 23, tying a daily record.

==== Elsewhere ====
In Arizona, 20,000 power outages were reported, with 9,000 in Coconino County and 5,000 in Maricopa County. Over 200 miles (320 km) of I-40 closed, from the New Mexico state line until the junction with US 93. In New Mexico, I-40 was also closed to the west of Gallup. In Albuquerque, winds gusted up to 73 mph (117 km/h), which left over 12,000 customers without electricity. In Utah, at least 110-120 crashes were reported, including on I-15, and I-84. In neighboring Nevada, a Care Flight medical flight crashed shortly after takeoff near Stagecoach, killing all five occupants. Weather at the time of the crash consisted of steady snow with winds of 20 to 30 mph (32 to 48 km/h). An investigation by the National Transportation Safety Board is ongoing to determine the cause of the accident. In Colorado, over 200 flights were cancelled at Denver International Airport. Crashes were reported on I-25 and I-70, causing road disruptions. After the storm moved through, Denver set a record for the coldest temperature on record for February 23, at −11 °F (−24 °C). On February 25, an avalanche near the Vallecito Reservoir in La Plata County killed two people while another killed one person in La Manga Pass. Northward in Wyoming, a large portion of I-80 and I-90 was closed. Snow stranded drivers and caused difficult conditions for first responders, including a near-miss when a semi almost hit a Wyoming Department of Transportation trooper. In Washington, snow fell in the Cascade Range and the Northern Rockies. The heavy snows, combined with 60 miles per hour (97 km/h) wind gusts, hindered efforts to rescue four people from an earlier avalanche, with only one surviving. In Seattle, after the storm passed, a record low high temperature of 35 °F (2 °C) was set on February 23, breaking the record from the previous year, while a record low temperature of 22 °F (−6 °C) was set the next morning. In Spokane, the high on February 23 was also a record, at only 16 °F (−9 °C).

=== Midwestern United States ===
In South Dakota, health departments, including Sanford Health and Avera Health, announced closures in Sioux Falls. Governor Kristi Noem ordered state government executive branch offices closed in 36 counties. Parts of I-90 and I-29 closed. To the east, the National Weather Service forecast office in the Twin Cities warned of a "historic" winter storm. About 1,600 free parking lots were made available in Minneapolis because of the inclement hazardous weather. Numerous airlines, such as Delta, Southwest, United, and American airlines issued travel waivers in Minneapolis–Saint Paul International Airport. The Weather Prediction Center issued a rare extreme impact risk area. Minnesota Governor Tim Walz issued a peacetime emergency and ordered emergency executive orders to the National Guard, Minnesota State Patrol, and Minnesota Department of Transportation. Snow emergencies were issued in the cities of Brooklyn Park, Crystal, and New Hope. Numerous businesses and stores, including Lunds & Byerlys, were closed. A no travel advisory was issued for several counties, including Brown, Cottonwood, Jackson, Martin, and Watonwan counties. In Wisconsin, Green Bay–Austin Straubel International Airport cancelled all flights on February 22 and most flights on February 23.

Snow accumulated as high as 13.5 inches (34 cm), four miles north of Rochester, Minnesota. Hundreds of crashes were reported, including jackknifed semi-trucks. Wind gusts of over 40 miles per hour (64 km/h) impacted the Twin cities. There were at least 134 calls for service to the south in Iowa, including 48 crashes which resulted in 10 injuries. To the east in Wisconsin, I-94 was closed, as well as Green Bay regional airports. There were more than 10,000 power outages, with 9,200+ of those outages from Kenosha alone. Hundreds of flights were cancelled at Milwaukee Mitchell International Airport. Snow emergencies were declared in Green Bay, Menasha, and Kaukauna. A parking garage in Glendale partially collapsed, damaging two cars. To the east, there were at least 811,000 power outages across Michigan, with over 485,000 in the Detroit Metropolitan Area alone. There was extreme amount of damage to power infrastructure. Ice accumulated as high as 0.65 inches (17 mm) in Ann Arbor. One firefighter died when a power line fell on him in Paw Paw. To the south in Illinois, icy conditions caused downed trees and power lines, blocking roads. 89,000 customers were without power in the Chicago metropolitan area.

Severe weather impacted the middle Mississippi Valley on February 22, particularly in the eastern St. Louis metropolitan area, where multiple reports of wind damage came in mainly for tree and power line damage.

=== Elsewhere ===
Record high temperatures were recorded in McAllen, Texas, at 95 °F (35 °C) on February 22. Atlanta also soared to a monthly record high of 81 °F (27 °C), as did Beckley, West Virginia at 77 °F (25 °C), and Chattanooga, Tennessee at 82 °F (28 °C). On February 23, Nashville hit a monthly record high of 85 °F (29 °C), which also tied the statewide record for highest temperature in February. Muscle Shoals, Alabama also hit a monthly record high of 86 °F (30 °C). The low of 69 °F (21 °C) on February 23 in Atlanta was not only the warmest low in February on record, but warmer than any low temperature in December, January or March. Pittsburgh hit 70 °F (21 °C) for the third time in February 2023, the first time in history that Pittsburgh reached seventy degrees or higher in February three times. However, some places further north in New Hampshire and Maine still recorded 5–10 in (13–25 cm) of snow late on February 23. Toronto broke a daily snowfall record due to the storm at 17.4 cm (6.9 in). The snow caused 14 cars to slide off I-89 in Franklin County, Vermont. Another car crash on I-91 in Hartland, Vermont caused a fatality. Boston Logan International Airport cancelled 125 flights and delayed 219 others on February 23.

Heavy snowfall fell in parts of the New York City metropolitan area between February 27 and 28. By the morning of February 28, New Canaan, Connecticut had received 7 in (18 cm) of snow, while Port Jervis, New York and Bloomingdale, New Jersey had received 6 and 8.5 in (15 and 22 cm) respectively. Up to 12 in (30 cm) of snow fell in Olivebridge, New York. However, less snow fell in the city itself, with 1.8 in (4.6 cm) of snow in Central Park, 1.5 in (3.8 cm) of snow at John F. Kennedy International Airport, 1.7 in (4.3 cm) at Newark, New Jersey and 2.7 in (6.9 cm) of snow at LaGuardia Airport, although parts of the Bronx saw as much as 5.6 in (14 cm) of snow. The snowstorm resulted in 150 flight cancellations at LaGuardia Airport, 100 at JFK Airport and 50 at Newark Airport. A snow emergency was declared due to the storm in Bridgeport, Connecticut. Despite the snow that fell, however, it wound up being one of the least snowy December–February periods across the region, and the least snowy winter on record in Central Park. The snow led to a 15-car pileup on the Massachusetts Turnpike.

== Tornado outbreak ==
=== February 26 ===
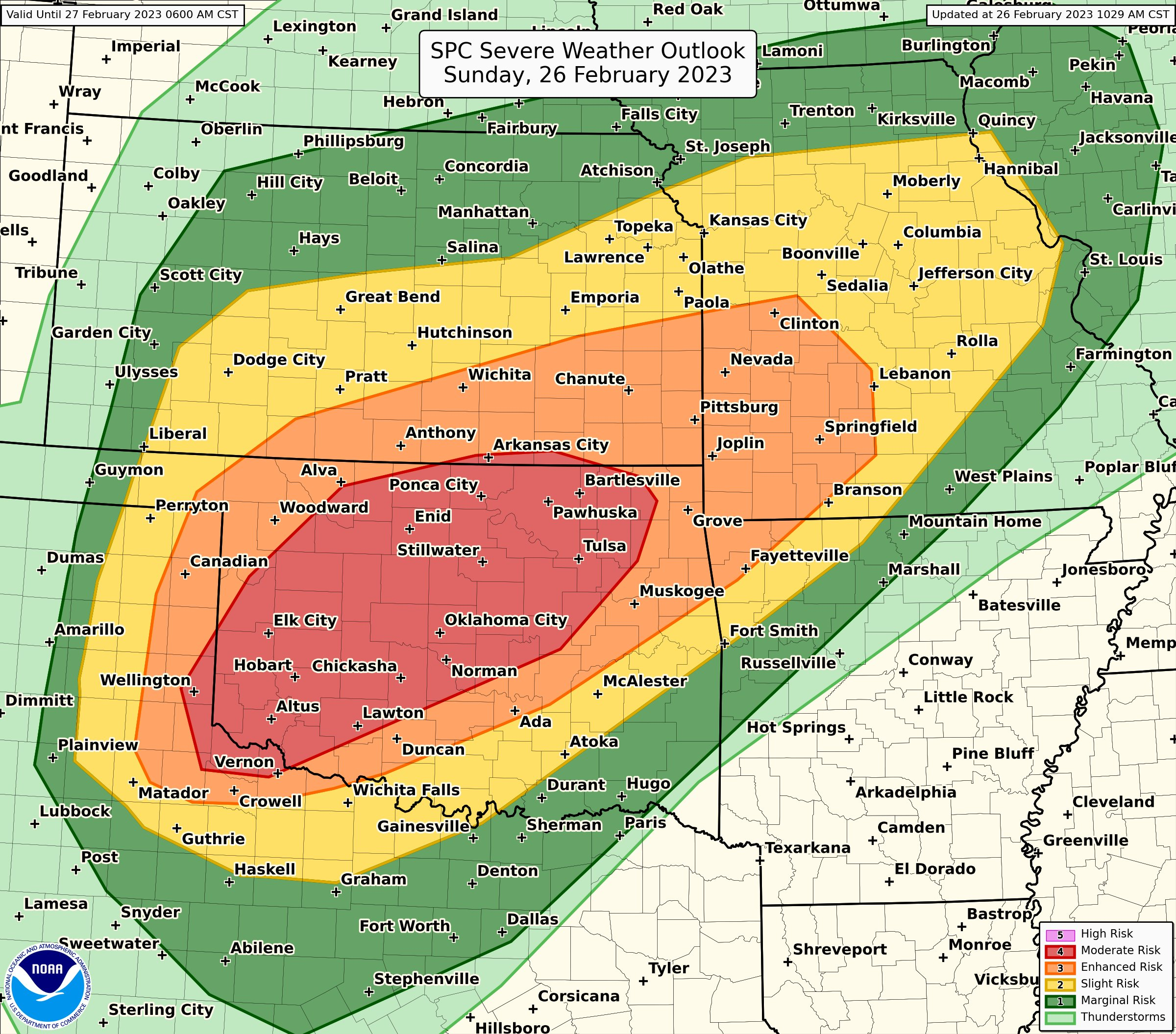
The Storm Prediction Center Severe Weather Outlook on February 26, 2023

The threat for organized severe weather across Oklahoma and adjacent areas was first highlighted by the Storm Prediction Center (SPC) nearly a week before the event, on February 21 with a 15 percent risk area issued for the eastern Texas Panhandle, the western half of Oklahoma and much of Kansas. The next day, as computer models began to exhibit greater consistency from run to run, a portion of the risk area was upgraded to a 30 percent risk area, and subsequently to a level 3/Enhanced risk on the day 3 convective outlook. The day before the event, this Enhanced risk was expanded northeastward toward Missouri and a level 4/Moderate risk was introduced across western Oklahoma, where increasing confidence caused forecasters to advertise the potential for a widespread damaging wind event. On February 26, the greatest risk area was again extended across much of Oklahoma, and the SPC also messaged the potential for a few strong/EF2+ tornadoes across southwestern portions of the state. The 1630 UTC day 1 outlook noted that a powerful derecho with embedded swaths of 80–110 miles per hour (130–180 km/h) straight-line winds was likely, along with embedded tornadoes – including the risk for strong (EF2+) tornadoes – and isolated instances of very large hail.

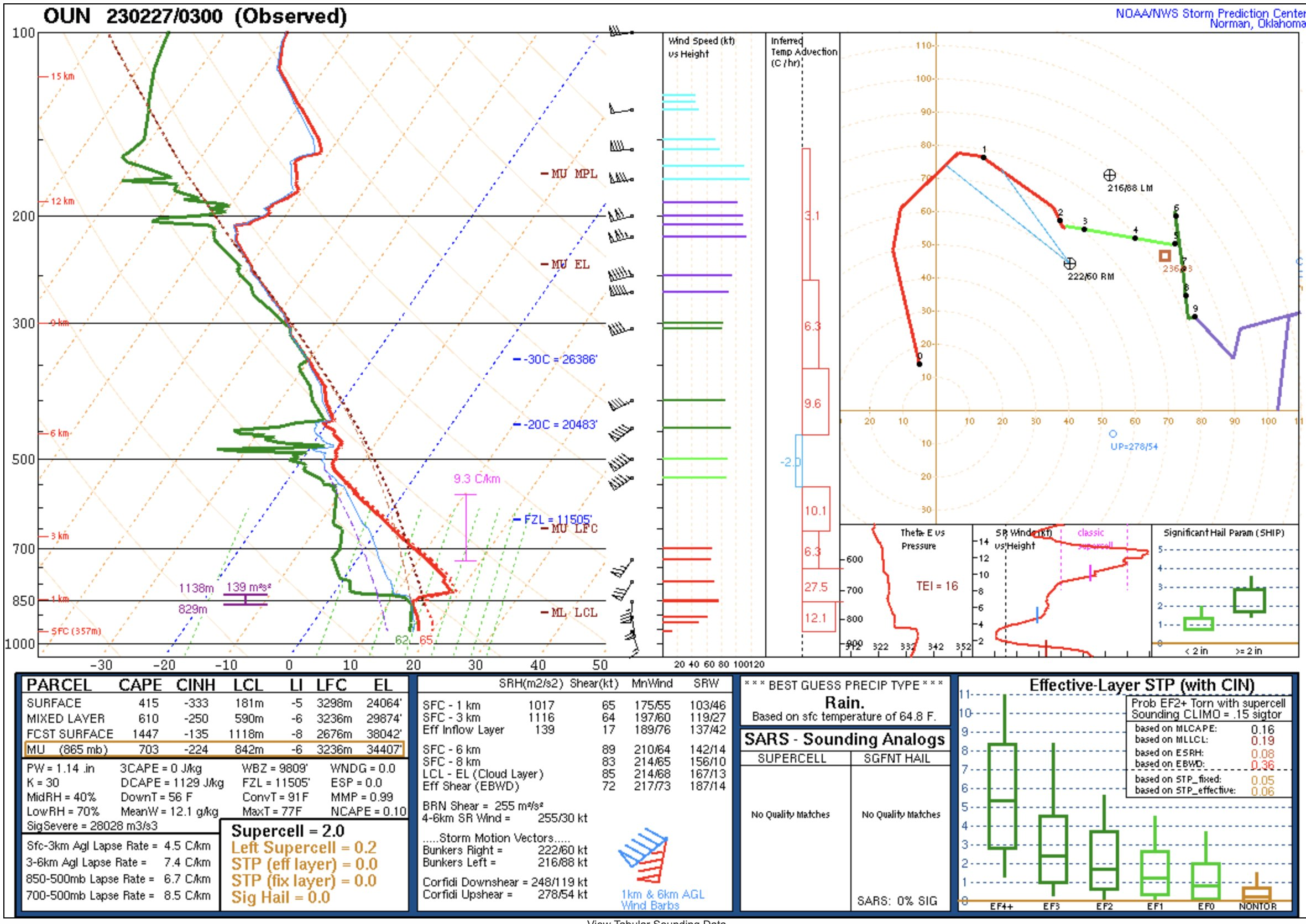
The historic 03Z observed sounding from Norman, Oklahoma, less than 20 minutes before an EF2 tornado struck the southeastern part of the city

On the morning of February 26, water vapor imagery depicted a well-defined and compact cold-core low progressing eastward across California and Nevada. A powerful shortwave trough accompanied this feature. Farther to the east, a warm front stretched from southern Louisiana across southern Texas, separating cooler and drier air to the north from a more unstable environment to the south. As low-level flow increased in advance of the cold-core low, southerly winds allowed that moist airmass to surge rapidly northward throughout the morning and afternoon hours. Much of the Texas and Oklahoma panhandles, as well as western Oklahoma, experienced a four to eight degree increase in dewpoints within just a three-hour period. The meteorologists at the SPC noticed this and issued a Tornado Watch for parts of Texas and Oklahoma. The Tornado Watch was later expanded into central, northern and southern Oklahoma. Prior to the development of thunderstorms, strong wind fields already existed across the region, with bulk wind shear (Note: Bulk wind shear is the change in wind shear between the surface and 6 kilometres (3.7 mi) aloft in the atmosphere. Greater values positively correlate with severe weather, and more specifically between supercell and non-supercell thunderstorm environments.) topping 70 knots (80 mph; 130 km/h) and forecast to increase further.

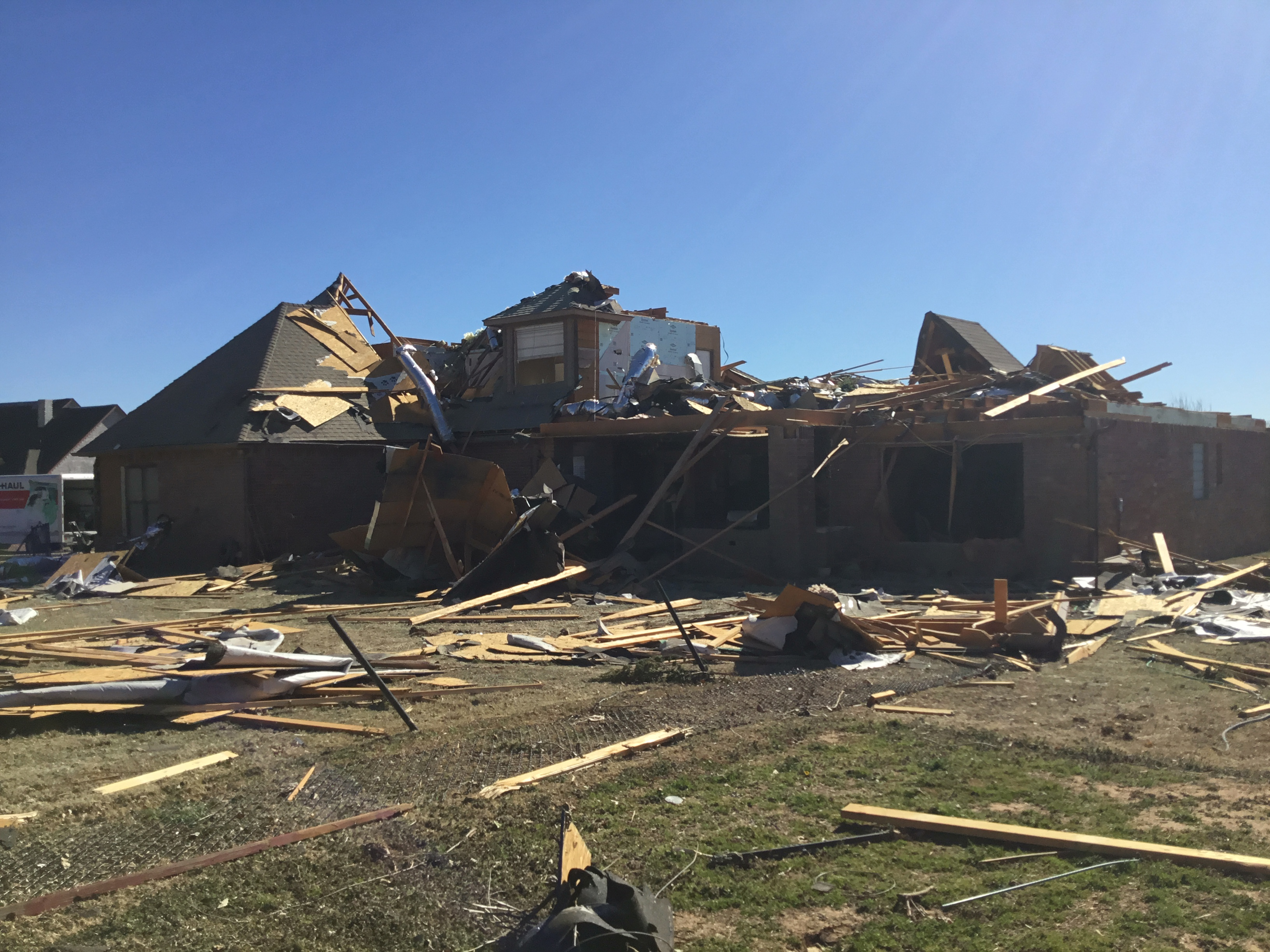
High-end EF2 damage to a home southeast of Norman, Oklahoma.

As the evening approached, supercells developed in the Texas Panhandle, further organizing as a cold front overtook the preexisting dryline and contributed to greater focus for convective activity. To the north, a complex line of storms developed near a 988 millibars (29.2 inHg) surface low in southwestern Kansas, where multiple tornadoes were reported. With time, the originally discrete storms from the Texas Panhandle became intertwined with a solidifying squall line pushing eastward into Oklahoma. These storms entered an environment of richer moisture, with dewpoints into the low 60s °F northward to near I-40, and modest instability on the order of 500–1,000 J/kg. Despite the presence of a capping inversion, strong forcing along the cold front was expected to erode inhibition, while low-level winds topping 70 knots (80 mph; 130 km/h) worked to assist in broad swaths of damaging winds. Favorable wind shear profiles supported embedded mesovortices and QLCS tornadoes within the line as the storm complex continued east. Multiple tornadoes occurred in the Eastern Texas Panhandle and Western Oklahoma, including a high-end EF2 tornado that obliterated manufactured homes and killed one person at the western edge of Cheyenne. Several damaging QLCS tornadoes also ended up touching down throughout the Oklahoma City metropolitan area, including another high-end EF2 tornado that caused significant damage in southeastern Norman. As storms entered eastern Oklahoma, they encountered a less favorable environment and weakened considerably, reducing the threat for severe weather with eastward extent into the pre-dawn hours of February 27, although scattered wind and tornado reports continued all the way into Missouri. In all, 12 tornadoes touched down in Oklahoma; the day alone set the record for the most tornadoes ever recorded in Oklahoma during the month of February (the previous record was 6 in February of 1975 and 2009). Over 100 reports of damaging straight-line wind gusts were received by the SPC, including multiple observations above hurricane-level windspeeds, peaking at 114 mph (183 km/h) in Memphis, Texas.

More than 76,000 people in Oklahoma lost power on the night of February 27, though it was restored for most by the following morning. Amtrak's northbound Heartland Flyer was severely delayed due to debris on the tracks caused by the EF2 Norman tornado.

=== February 27 ===
More severe weather was forecast for February 27, although the threat area was initially poorly forecast. A 15 percent risk area was initially outlined for eastern Kentucky and eastern Tennessee on February 24. The outlined area was given a slight risk the next day, thought weather data models began to show that ingredients for severe weather were shifting farther north towards the Ohio Valley region. The slight risk was then shifted northwestward twice the subsequent day at both day 2 outlook times. By the time the day 1 outlook was issued, the slight risk covered much of the Ohio Valley. While only moderate instability was in place, very strong wind shear and a discrete convective mode close to the surface low brought the possibility of both damaging winds and a few tornadoes in this area, with a 5% tornado risk area in place for much of Ohio, and a 2% tornado risk present farther west across Indiana and Illinois. Later that day, multiple supercell thunderstorms developed in Illinois before they tracked eastward. Two EF0 tornadoes caused minimal damage in the Chicago suburbs of Plainfield and Naperville. Farther east in Indiana, a high-end EF1 tornado damaged the roof of a warehouse, snapped trees, and damaged or destroyed barns and outbuildings near McCordsville. In Ohio, another high-end EF1 tornado caused considerable damage to homes, trees, and outbuildings in and around Jacksonburg. An EF0 tornado overturned mobile homes and damaged abandoned farm structures at the Pickaway Correctional Institution near Orient. Several other weak tornadoes were also confirmed across all three states as well.

=== Confirmed tornadoes ===
Confirmed tornadoes by Enhanced Fujita rating
EFU	EF0	EF1	EF2	EF3	EF4	EF5	Total
3	13	12	3	0	0	0	31

=== February 26 event ===
List of confirmed tornadoes – Sunday, February 26, 2023 (Note: All dates are based on the local time zone where the tornado touched down; however, all times are in Coordinated Universal Time for consistency.)
EF#	Location	County / Parish	State	Start Coord.	Time (UTC)	Path length	Max width
EF0	Eastern Liberal	Seward	KS	37.014°N 100.9198°W	22:42–22:54	3.89 mi (6.26 km)	20 yd (18 m)
EF0	A small high-end EF0 tornado moved through the eastern edge of Liberal. A house and an adjacent outbuilding suffered garage door failure, resulting in the uplift of a portion of the roof deck, while other homes had minor damage. A few mobile homes sustained roof and window damage, one of which slid off its foundation blocks. An outbuilding was heavily damaged, and a small, unanchored garden shed was rolled 30 feet (9.1 m). Fencing was blown over, and some empty plastic chemical tanks were tossed around.						
EF0	WNW of Shamrock	Wheeler	TX	35.2457°N 100.3964°W	00:29–00:30	0.19 mi (0.31 km)	25 yd (23 m)
EF0	A very brief tornado was captured on video; no damage was observed.						
EF1	SE of Kelton	Wheeler	TX	35.3868°N 100.1214°W	00:41–00:46	1.88 mi (3.03 km)	50 yd (46 m)
EF1	This high-end EF1 tornado captured on video by a storm chaser as it touched down southeast of the rural community of Kelton. A metal outbuilding was completely destroyed, with debris strewn downwind and wrapped around trees. Another outbuilding was damaged, trees were snapped or uprooted, and tumbleweeds were blown into a fence that was partially knocked down.						
EFU	NE of Dodson, TX to SSE of Vinson	Harmon	OK	34.81°N 99.954°W	01:08–01:14	7.5 mi (12.1 km)	200 yd (180 m)
EFU	Storm chasers observed a tornado. No damage was observed, and the tornado's path length is estimated.						
EF2	Western Cheyenne to W of Strong City	Roger Mills	OK	35.61°N 99.70°W	01:13–01:18	7 mi (11 km)	500 yd (460 m)
EF2	1 death – A high-end EF2 tornado touched down at the Mignon Laird Municipal Airport and caused major damage as it struck the west edge of Cheyenne, along with rural areas north-northeast of town. Several manufactured homes were obliterated and swept away, and an occupant of one of the residences was killed. Debris from the manufactured homes was scattered long distances through fields, vehicles were flipped and tossed, and major tree damage occurred, including some debarking. A cell tower was toppled over, and a two-story frame home had a large section of its roof removed, along with a second floor exterior wall. A few other houses also had significant roof damage, and an RV was rolled into the side of one residence. Outbuildings were also damaged or destroyed, power poles were snapped, and an ODOT building had a large section of its roof torn off. Some metal-framed buildings were also heavily damaged, one of which sustained buckling of its roof purlins. In addition to the fatality, at least three people were injured. A photograph from one of the destroyed mobile homes was found roughly 100 miles (160 km) away in Lambert.						
EF1	S of Erick	Beckham	OK	35.15°N 99.918°W	01:13–01:18	6 mi (9.7 km)	100 yd (91 m)
EF1	A few barns were destroyed, while power lines and tree branches were damaged as well.						
EF1	ENE of Vinson to S of Willow	Greer	OK	34.937°N 99.682°W	01:23–01:34	11 mi (18 km)	75 yd (69 m)
EF1	Trees were damaged or uprooted, power poles were snapped, and outbuildings were damaged. This tornado was upgraded from EF0 to EF1 by the National Weather Service in Norman, Oklahoma three months later.						
EF1	E of Lone Wolf to NNW of Hobart	Kiowa	OK	34.987°N 99.202°W	01:45–01:54	7.5 mi (12.1 km)	600 yd (550 m)
EF1	This tornado was caught on video via a Ring security camera. A propane tank was tossed, power poles were snapped, and tree limbs were downed. Outbuildings were damaged or destroyed, and metal debris was thrown into fields. A stop sign was blown over as well.						
EF0	NW of Amorita	Alfalfa	OK	36.94°N 98.306°W	02:31–02:32	0.2 mi (0.32 km)	50 yd (46 m)
EF0	A farm shed was destroyed by this brief tornado.						
EF0	NW of Gracemont	Caddo	OK	35.163°N 98.284°W	02:32–02:39	5.1 mi (8.2 km)	75 yd (69 m)
EF0	Trees were damaged and granite headstones were moved at a cemetery.						
EF0	WSW of Minco	Grady	OK	35.276°N 98.013°W	02:52–02:53	0.25 mi (0.40 km)	75 yd (69 m)
EF0	This brief tornado damaged a barn and a garage.						
EF1	W of Tuttle to WNW of Mustang	Grady, Canadian	OK	35.284°N 97.867°W	02:57–03:07	10.7 mi (17.2 km)	200 yd (180 m)
EF1	This tornado passed to the west of Tuttle and Mustang, inflicting major roof damage to multiple homes, and damaging or destroying several metal outbuildings. Power poles were snapped, a decorative brick wall was blown over, and a stop sign was bent to the ground. A few trees were uprooted as well.						
EF1	Western Oklahoma City to Bethany	Oklahoma	OK	35.424°N 97.66°W	03:12–03:18	5.5 mi (8.9 km)	500 yd (460 m)
EF1	This tornado moved through the western suburbs of Oklahoma City. Metal buildings and a restaurant supply business had roofing torn off, and another business had one of its exterior walls blown out. Carports, fences, power poles, and trees were damaged as well.						
EF2	NE of Cole to Southeastern Norman to SSW of Newalla	McClain, Cleveland	OK	35.123°N 97.55°W	03:15–03:38	26.12 mi (42.04 km)	900 yd (820 m)
EF2	A strong, fast-moving and damaging tornado touched down near Cole and moved northeastward, damaging the roofs of homes, overturning a semi-truck on I-35, snapping power poles, and causing considerable damage to hangars at the David J Perry Airport in Goldsby. The tornado crossed the Canadian River into the southeastern part of Norman and strengthened to high-end EF2 intensity, destroying part of a self-storage facility, heavily damaging two gas stations, and damaging 450 homes and some apartment buildings. 150 homes sustained some sort of roof damage, 50 of which had partial to total loss of their roofs, along with a few that had some loss of exterior walls. The NCED Hotel and Conference Center sustained considerable damage to one of its exterior walls, and several cars were flipped, moved, or damaged by flying debris. Many trees were snapped or uprooted in Norman, and numerous wooden power poles were also snapped. Continuing northeast of Norman, the tornado damaged many additional homes, several of which had their roofs and exterior walls ripped off at high-end EF2 strength. Extensive tree and power pole damage occurred before the tornado moved farther to the northeast, causing less intense damage to trees and power poles in and around the rural community of Stella before dissipating. The tornado injured twelve people and caused $50.2 million (2023 USD) in damage. In an analysis of the tornado, it was determined that this tornado was moving over 60 miles per hour (97 km/h).						
EF1	SSE of Newalla to southern McLoud	Cleveland, Pottawatomie	OK	35.376°N 97.146°W	03:42–03:48	6 mi (9.7 km)	100 yd (91 m)
EF1	A couple of homes had roof damage, a mobile home was damaged, and an RV was overturned. Outbuildings were damaged, power poles were snapped, and trees were snapped or uprooted.						
EF2	Northern Shawnee to E of Meeker	Pottawatomie, Lincoln	OK	35.39°N 96.922°W	03:45–03:51	6.1 mi (9.8 km)	200 yd (180 m)
EF2	This strong tornado touched down just north of the Shawnee Mall at the northern edge of Shawnee, snapping power poles and overturning pivot irrigation sprinklers. It tracked to the north-northeast and reached high-end EF2 strength as it moved into Aydelotte, where it partially or completely unroofed a few homes, overturned vehicles, downed trees, and damaged or destroyed well-built garages and storage buildings. The tornado crossed into Lincoln County and caused some additional tree and outbuilding damage before dissipating. Another high-end EF2 tornado would strike Shawnee and Aydelotte on April 19.						

=== February 27 event ===
List of confirmed tornadoes – Monday, February 27, 2023
EF#	Location	County / Parish	State	Start Coord.	Time (UTC)	Path length	Max width
EF1	NW of McElhany	Newton	MO	36.80°N 94.42°W	07:02–07:03	0.75 mi (1.21 km)	200 yd (180 m)
EF1	Over ten farm outbuildings and farm implements were heavily damaged or destroyed, two RVs were rolled, and minor roof damage was inflicted to a few homes. Trees and power lines were damaged as well.						
EF0	E of Golden City	Dade	MO	37.372°N 94.045°W	07:25–07:27	1.65 mi (2.66 km)	200 yd (180 m)
EF0	A large machinery outbuilding was heavily damaged, with tin from the structure being strewn in a cyclonic manner. Tree limbs were downed as well.						
EF0	E of Cane Hill	Dade	MO	37.56°N 93.69°W	07:47–07:49	1.29 mi (2.08 km)	100 yd (91 m)
EF0	A few weakly-rooted trees were uprooted, and large branches were broken off other trees.						
EF0	E of Bondville	Champaign	IL	40.0975°N 88.3564°W	14:43–14:44	1.14 mi (1.83 km)	30 yd (27 m)
EF0	A farm outbuilding suffered minor damage.						
EFU	N of Champaign	Champaign	IL	40.1694°N 88.2649°W	14:55–14:56	1.53 mi (2.46 km)	25 yd (23 m)
EFU	A tornado touched down and crossed I-57, inflicting no damage.						
EFU	SW of Clarence	Ford	IL	40.4400°N 88.0000°W	15:15–15:17	1.6 mi (2.6 km)	50 yd (46 m)
EFU	A tornado was confirmed by eyewitness accounts and photos and videos. No known damage occurred.						
EF0	NW of Shorewood to Southwestern Plainfield	Kendall, Will	IL	41.5501°N 88.2636°W	15:41–15:44	2.2 mi (3.5 km)	100 yd (91 m)
EF0	This high-end EF0 tornado inflicted trim and roof shingle damage to numerous homes as it moved through residential areas. A few homes also had damage to gutters and windows, and one home suffered additional damage after a trampoline was thrown into it, impaling several pieces of it into the home's siding. The roof of a garden shed was damaged, and trees and tree branches were downed as well.						
EF0	Northern Naperville	DuPage	IL	41.7839°N 88.1619°W	15:52–15:54	1.4 mi (2.3 km)	30 yd (27 m)
EF0	Several trees were damaged in Naperville as a result of this weak tornado.						
EF1	SE of McCordsville	Hancock	IN	39.8656°N 85.9115°W	18:28–18:34	5.24 mi (8.43 km)	50 yd (46 m)
EF1	A high-end EF1 tornado damaged the roof of a warehouse and destroyed a farm outbuilding. A large and historic barn was damaged and slid off its foundation, and numerous trees were snapped.						
EF1	Eden	Hancock	IN	39.9423°N 85.7692°W	18:37–18:39	0.29 mi (0.47 km)	50 yd (46 m)
EF1	A brief tornado touched down in the rural community of Eden, removing the roof and exterior wall of a barn, and driving 2x4 beams into the ground at different angles downwind of the structure. Several trees were snapped or uprooted as well.						
EF1	Jacksonburg to NW of Middletown	Butler	OH	39.5381°N 84.5036°W	19:37–19:43	4.17 mi (6.71 km)	150 yd (140 m)
EF1	This tornado first touched down in Jacksonburg, where minor tree and outbuilding damage occurred. The tornado continued to the northeast, where homes suffered minor to severe roof and siding damage, including one two-story home that was unroofed and had a second story back wall knocked down at high-end EF1 strength. A nearby barn was also leveled on the property, with debris from the structure being strewn through an adjacent field. An RV trailer was tipped over onto a vehicle, and dozens of trees were snapped or uprooted along the path as well.						
EF0	Convoy	Van Wert	OH	40.9171°N 84.7159°W	20:00–20:02	0.59 mi (0.95 km)	75 yd (69 m)
EF0	A weak tornado lofted a swing set and tossed a small, unanchored chicken coop over a shed. The side of the shed was pushed in, while its metal roofing was pushed out. Sporadic tree and shingle damage occurred in town as well.						
EF1	N of Dodo to W of Dialton	Clark	OH	40.0091°N 84.004°W	20:19–20:21	2.31 mi (3.72 km)	300 yd (270 m)
EF1	A barn was completely destroyed, and several homes had roof shingles and siding removed, including four well-built homes that suffered minor to moderate roof damage. One of the homes also had its garage door blown in, and trees were snapped or uprooted as well, including one tree that fell on and severely damaged a home's front porch awning.						
EF0	SW of Orient	Pickaway	OH	39.7889°N 83.1773°W	21:03–21:05	1.35 mi (2.17 km)	100 yd (91 m)
EF0	A high-end EF0 tornado rolled two strapped down single-wide manufactured homes onto their sides and caused lesser damage to several other nearby manufactured homes. A garage was unroofed, and multiple abandoned farm structures at the Pickaway Correctional Institution sustained considerable damage. A frame home sustained minor roof damage, and trees and tree branches were downed. The tornado dissipated as it was entering Orient, although building insulation was found in trees throughout the town.						
EF0	SE of Etna	Licking	OH	39.9491°N 82.6492°W	21:41–21:42	0.29 mi (0.47 km)	90 yd (82 m)
EF0	A brief tornado lofted a small metal shed over some trees, with debris scattered 200 feet (61 m) away. Several softwood trees were snapped or uprooted as well.						

== See also ==
- Tornadoes of 2023
  - List of United States tornadoes from January to March 2023
- List of North American tornadoes and tornado outbreaks
- List of tornadoes in Cleveland County, Oklahoma
- Weather of 2023
