= Northeastern Local School District (Clark County, Ohio) =

School district in Ohio, United States

Address
- 4435 Bosart Road Springfield, Ohio, 45503; United States

District information
- Type: Public
- Grades: PK–12
- Schools: 4
- NCES District ID: 3904625

Students and staff
- Students: 2,961 (2024–2025)
- Teachers: 161.35 (on an FTE basis) (2024–2025)
- Staff: 370.28 (on an FTE basis) (2024–2025)
- Student–teacher ratio: 18.35 (2024–2025)

Other information
- Website: www.nelsd.org

Northeastern Local School District is a school district mostly in Clark County, Ohio.

In Clark County, the district includes Catawba, Northridge, South Vienna, and a portion of Springfield. Townships in Clark County that the district has include Pleasant and most of Harmony and Moorefield. A small portion is in Champaign County, where it occupies a part of Union Township.

== History ==
John Kronour, who was superintendent, resigned effective 2024.

On August 1, 2024, Jack Fisher was scheduled to become the superintendent.

== Schools ==
- Kenton Ridge Middle and High School
- Northeastern Middle and High School
- Kenton Ridge Elementary School
- Northeastern Elementary School
