= Eagle City =

Eagle City may refer to the following places in the United States:

- Eagle City, Ohio, an unincorporated community
- Eagle City, Oklahoma, a community in Blaine County
- Eagle City, Utah, a ghost town in Garfield County
- Eagle City, North Carolina, a former city in Eagle Mills Township, Iredell County
