= Sugar Grove =

Sugar Grove may refer to the following places in the United States:

- Sugar Grove, Illinois, a village
- Sugar Grove, Schuyler County, Illinois, an unincorporated community
- Sugar Grove, North Carolina, an unincorporated community
- Sugar Grove, Ohio, Fairfield County, a village
- Sugar Grove, Clark County, Ohio, an unincorporated community
- Sugar Grove, Pennsylvania, a borough
- Sugar Grove, Virginia, Smyth County, a census designated place
- Sugar Grove, Montgomery County, Virginia, an unincorporated community
- Sugar Grove, West Virginia, a small community
- Sugar Grove, Wisconsin, an unincorporated community
- Sugar Grove Township (disambiguation), various townships
- Sugar Grove Station, a National Security Agency facility near Sugar Grove, West Virginia
