= Clark County, Ohio =

County in Ohio, United States

- County
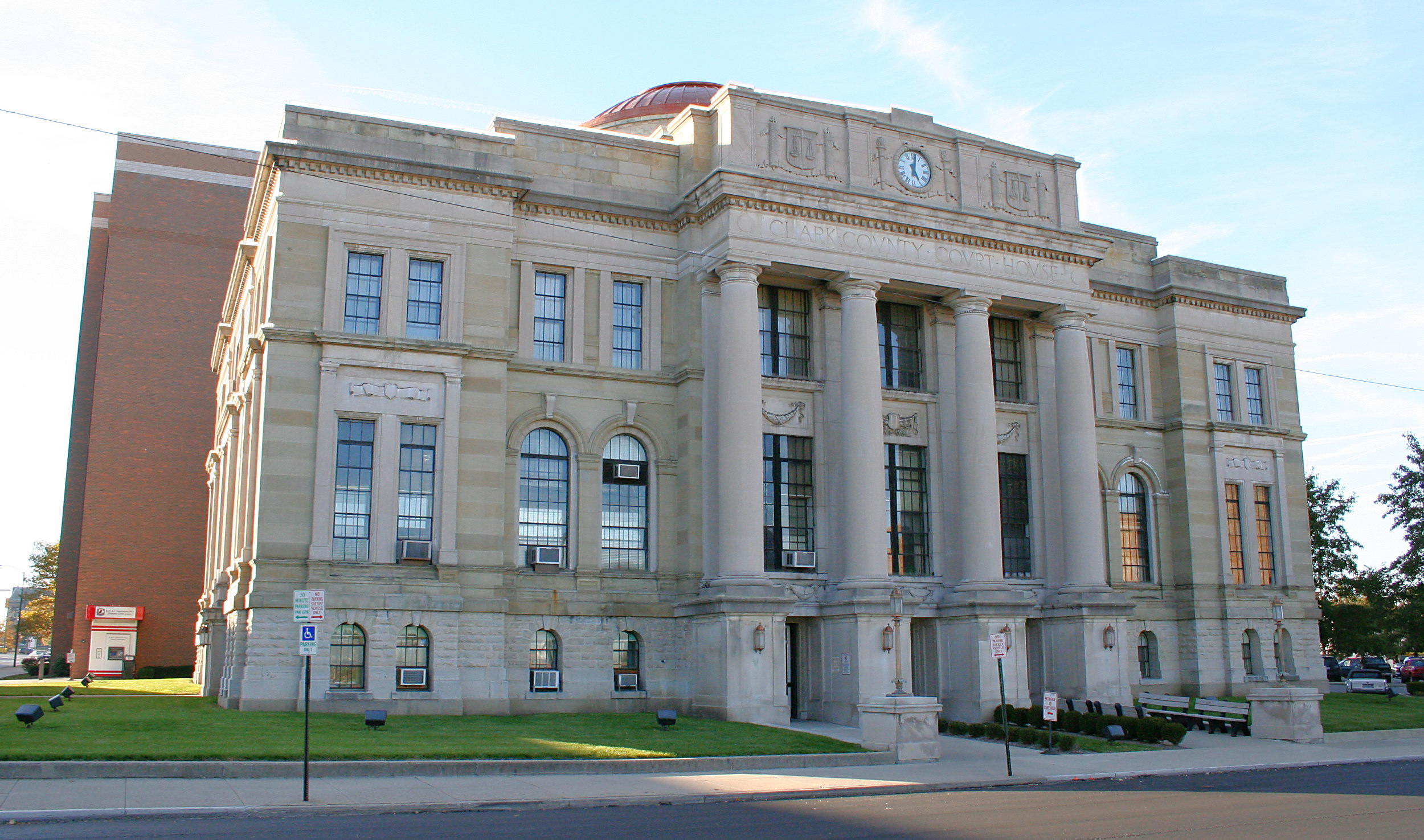
- Clark County Courthouse

- Flag Seal

- Location within the U.S. state of Ohio
- Coordinates: 39°55′N 83°47′W
- Country: United States
- State: Ohio
- Founded: March 1, 1818
- Named for: George Rogers Clark
- Seat: Springfield
- Largest city: Springfield

Area
  - Total: 403 sq mi (1,040 km^{2})
  - Land: 397 sq mi (1,030 km^{2})
  - Water: 5.1 sq mi (13 km^{2}) 1.3%

Population (2020)
  - Total: 136,001
  - Estimate (2025): 135,340 ▼
  - Density: 343/sq mi (132/km^{2})
- Time zone: UTC−5 (Eastern)
  - Summer (DST): UTC−4 (EDT)
- Congressional districts: 10th, 15th
- Website: www.clarkcountyohio.gov

Clark County is a county located in the west central portion of the U.S. state of Ohio. As of the 2020 census, the population was 136,001. Its county seat and largest city is Springfield. The county was created on March 1, 1818, and was named for General George Rogers Clark, a hero of the American Revolution. Clark County comprises the Springfield, OH Metropolitan Statistical Area, which is also included in the Dayton-Springfield-Sidney-OH Combined Statistical Area.

== Geography ==
According to the U.S. Census Bureau, the county has a total area of 403 square miles (1,040 km^{2}), of which 397 square miles (1,030 km^{2}) is land and 5.1 square miles (13 km^{2}) (1.3%) is water. It is the third-smallest county in Ohio by total area.

=== Adjacent counties ===
- Champaign County (north)
- Madison County (east)
- Greene County (south)
- Montgomery County (southwest)
- Miami County (west)

== Demographics ==
Historical population
Census	Pop.	Note	%±
1820	9,533		—
1830	13,114		37.6%
1840	16,882		28.7%
1850	22,178		31.4%
1860	25,300		14.1%
1870	32,070		26.8%
1880	41,948		30.8%
1890	52,277		24.6%
1900	58,939		12.7%
1910	66,435		12.7%
1920	80,728		21.5%
1930	90,936		12.6%
1940	95,647		5.2%
1950	111,661		16.7%
1960	131,440		17.7%
1970	157,115		19.5%
1980	150,236		−4.4%
1990	147,548		−1.8%
2000	144,742		−1.9%
2010	138,333		−4.4%
2020	136,001		−1.7%
2025 (est.)	135,340	▼	−0.5%
U.S. Decennial Census; 1790-1960 1900-1990; 1990-2000 2020

=== 2020 census ===
As of the 2020 census, the county had a population of 136,001 and a median age of 42.0 years; 22.3% of residents were under the age of 18 and 20.4% were 65 years of age or older. For every 100 females there were 94.7 males, and for every 100 females age 18 and over there were 91.9 males.

The racial makeup of the county was 81.7% White, 9.0% Black or African American, 0.3% American Indian and Alaska Native, 0.7% Asian, 0.1% Native Hawaiian and Pacific Islander, 1.9% from some other race, and 6.4% from two or more races. Hispanic or Latino residents of any race comprised 3.9% of the population.

74.6% of residents lived in urban areas, while 25.4% lived in rural areas.

There were 55,844 households in the county, of which 27.8% had children under the age of 18 living in them. Of all households, 43.0% were married-couple households, 19.3% were households with a male householder and no spouse or partner present, and 29.1% were households with a female householder and no spouse or partner present. About 30.5% of all households were made up of individuals and 14.3% had someone living alone who was 65 years of age or older.

There were 60,987 housing units, of which 8.4% were vacant. Among occupied housing units, 66.3% were owner-occupied and 33.7% were renter-occupied. The homeowner vacancy rate was 1.6% and the rental vacancy rate was 7.7%.

The median income for a household in the county was $51,504, and the median income for a family was $63,361. 15.3% of the population were below the poverty line, including 21.8% of those under age 18 and 8.6% of those age 65 or over.

The labor force participation rate for those aged 20 to 64 was 76.6%. 88.9% of the population over the age of 25 had obtained a high school diploma or equivalency, 18.9% of those over the age of 25 held bachelor's degrees.

=== Racial and ethnic composition ===
Clark County, Ohio – Racial and ethnic composition Note: the US Census treats Hispanic/Latino as an ethnic category. This table excludes Latinos from the racial categories and assigns them to a separate category. Hispanics/Latinos may be of any race.
Race / Ethnicity (NH = Non-Hispanic)	Pop 1980	Pop 1990	Pop 2000	Pop 2010	Pop 2020	% 1980	% 1990	% 2000	% 2010	% 2020
White alone (NH)	135,352	132,640	126,748	117,976	109,794	90.09%	89.90%	87.57%	85.28%	80.73%
Black or African American alone (NH)	13,100	12,954	12,867	11,999	12,074	8.72%	8.78%	8.89%	8.67%	8.88%
Native American or Alaska Native alone (NH)	201	277	353	302	314	0.13%	0.19%	0.24%	0.22%	0.23%
Asian alone (NH)	448	627	751	849	898	0.30%	0.42%	0.52%	0.61%	0.66%
Native Hawaiian or Pacific Islander alone (NH)	x	x	31	47	91	x	x	0.02%	0.03%	0.07%
Other race alone (NH)	259	80	187	232	538	0.17%	0.05%	0.13%	0.17%	0.40%
Mixed race or Multiracial (NH)	x	x	2,106	3,123	6,979	x	x	1.46%	2.26%	5.13%
Hispanic or Latino (any race)	876	970	1,699	3,805	5,313	0.58%	0.66%	1.17%	2.75%	3.91%
Total	150,236	147,548	144,742	138,333	136,001	100.00%	100.00%	100.00%	100.00%	100.00%

=== 2010 census ===
As of the 2010 United States census, there were 138,333 people, 55,244 households, and 36,906 families living in the county. The population density was 348.0 inhabitants per square mile (134.4/km^{2}). There were 61,419 housing units at an average density of 154.5 units per square mile (59.7 units/km^{2}). The racial makeup of the county was 86.3% white, 8.8% black or African American, 0.6% Asian, 0.3% American Indian, 1.4% from other races, and 2.5% from two or more races. Those of Hispanic or Latino origin made up 2.8% of the population. In terms of ancestry, 25.3% were German, 15.0% were Irish, 13.8% were American, and 10.5% were English.

Of the 55,244 households, 31.1% had children under the age of 18 living with them, 47.5% were married couples living together, 14.1% had a female householder with no husband present, 33.2% were non-families, and 27.7% of all households were made up of individuals. The average household size was 2.45 and the average family size was 2.96. The median age was 40.5 years.

The median income for a household in the county was $44,141 and the median income for a family was $53,678. Males had a median income of $43,209 versus $30,811 for females. The per capita income for the county was $22,110. About 11.1% of families and 15.9% of the population were below the poverty line, including 24.5% of those under age 18 and 7.4% of those age 65 or over.

=== 2000 census ===
As of the census of 2000, there were 144,742 people, 56,648 households, and 39,370 families living in the county. The population density was 362 people per square mile (140 people/km^{2}). There were 61,056 housing units at an average density of 153 units per square mile (59/km^{2}). The racial makeup of the county was 88.12% White, 8.95% Black or African American, 0.28% Native American, 0.53% Asian, 0.02% Pacific Islander, 0.53% from other races, and 1.58% from two or more races. 1.17% of the population were Hispanic or Latino of any race. 23.8% were of German, 21.6% American, 10.4% Irish and 8.7% English ancestry according to Census 2000.

There were 56,648 households, out of which 31.40% had children under the age of 18 living with them, 52.60% were married couples living together, 12.80% had a female householder with no husband present, and 30.50% were non-families. 26.00% of all households were made up of individuals, and 11.10% had someone living alone who was 65 years of age or older. The average household size was 2.49 and the average family size was 2.97.

In the county, the population was spread out, with 25.10% under the age of 18, 9.10% from 18 to 24, 26.80% from 25 to 44, 24.30% from 45 to 64, and 14.70% who were 65 years of age or older. The median age was 38 years. For every 100 females there were 92.50 males. For every 100 females age 18 and over, there were 88.60 males.

The median income for a household in the county was $40,340, and the median income for a family was $48,259. Males had a median income of $37,157 versus $24,688 for females. The per capita income for the county was $19,501. About 7.90% of families and 10.70% of the population were below the poverty line, including 14.90% of those under age 18 and 8.20% of those age 65 or over.

=== Metropolitan Statistical Area ===
The Springfield metropolitan area was first defined in 1950. Then known as the Springfield Standard Metropolitan Area (Springfield SMA), it consisted of a single county – Clark – and had a population of 111,661. Following a term change by the Bureau of the Budget (present-day Office of Management and Budget) in 1959, the Springfield SMA became the Springfield Standard Metropolitan Statistical Area (Springfield SMSA). By the census of 1960, the population had grown to 131,440, an 18 percent increase over the previous census. Champaign County was added to the Springfield SMSA in 1973. The two-county area had a combined population of 187,606 in 1970.

In 1983, the official name was shortened to the Springfield Metropolitan Statistical Area (Springfield MSA). That same year, Dayton and Springfield were grouped together as the Dayton-Springfield Metropolitan Statistical Area. The new MSA consisted of four counties – Clark, Greene, Miami, and Montgomery. This arrangement remained unchanged until 2003, when the MSA was split with Springfield's newly defined metropolitan area including only Clark County.

== Notable people ==
- George Harrison Shull (1874–1954) plant geneticist, was born in Clark County

== Politics ==
Clark County has voted Republican in every presidential election since 2004, with Donald Trump receiving 57% of the vote in 2016, a deviation from the usual tight results in the county. In 2012, Mitt Romney won the county, but by only 523 votes out of 64,301 cast for president.

County Commissioners - (President) Melanie Flax Wilt (R), Rick Lohnes (R), and Lowell McGlothlin (R)

Sheriff - Christopher Clark (R)

Recorder - Nancy Pence (R)

Treasurer - Pamela Littlejohn (R)

Auditor - Hillary Hamilton (R)

Prosecuting Attorney - Dan Driscoll (R)

Coroner - Susan L. Brown, DO (D)

Judicial

Municipal Court

Clerk of Courts - Sheila Rice (D)

Judges - Valerie Wilt (R), Stephen A. Schumaker (R), Daniel Carey (R)

Common Pleas Court

Clerk of Courts - Melissa Tuttle (R)

General Division - Judges Douglas Rastatter (R) and Brian Driscoll (R)

Domestic Relations - Judge Thomas Capper (R)

Juvenile Court - Judge Katrine M Lancaster (R)

Probate - Judge Richard Carey (R)

United States presidential election results for Clark County, Ohio
Year	Republican		Democratic		Third party(ies)	
Year	No.	%	No.	%	No.	%
1856	2,641	60.74%	1,539	35.40%	168	3.86%
1860	3,017	60.15%	1,730	34.49%	269	5.36%
1864	3,720	68.61%	1,702	31.39%	0	0.00%
1868	3,928	64.12%	2,198	35.88%	0	0.00%
1872	4,095	60.80%	2,612	38.78%	28	0.42%
1876	5,136	58.90%	3,536	40.55%	48	0.55%
1880	6,229	58.95%	4,179	39.55%	158	1.50%
1884	7,517	57.25%	5,204	39.64%	408	3.11%
1888	7,128	51.79%	5,860	42.58%	774	5.62%
1892	6,214	50.10%	5,255	42.37%	933	7.52%
1896	7,667	53.89%	6,382	44.86%	179	1.26%
1900	8,806	57.33%	6,243	40.64%	312	2.03%
1904	9,355	62.02%	4,565	30.26%	1,164	7.72%
1908	8,917	52.97%	6,529	38.78%	1,388	8.25%
1912	6,036	36.16%	5,217	31.25%	5,440	32.59%
1916	8,715	47.64%	8,848	48.37%	730	3.99%
1920	19,869	57.52%	14,097	40.81%	574	1.66%
1924	20,340	66.44%	8,415	27.49%	1,860	6.08%
1928	26,666	71.72%	10,316	27.74%	201	0.54%
1932	19,028	51.49%	17,314	46.86%	610	1.65%
1936	15,483	36.40%	26,138	61.44%	919	2.16%
1940	20,681	44.41%	25,888	55.59%	0	0.00%
1944	22,207	49.83%	22,362	50.17%	0	0.00%
1948	18,548	51.64%	17,236	47.99%	133	0.37%
1952	27,464	56.92%	20,786	43.08%	0	0.00%
1956	28,767	61.94%	17,680	38.06%	0	0.00%
1960	30,588	57.67%	22,456	42.33%	0	0.00%
1964	19,112	35.80%	34,275	64.20%	0	0.00%
1968	23,748	43.58%	24,029	44.10%	6,714	12.32%
1972	34,447	61.79%	19,725	35.38%	1,578	2.83%
1976	26,745	48.93%	26,135	47.81%	1,780	3.26%
1980	27,237	50.42%	22,630	41.90%	4,148	7.68%
1984	35,831	62.05%	21,154	36.63%	759	1.31%
1988	32,729	57.92%	23,247	41.14%	527	0.93%
1992	24,011	37.79%	26,692	42.01%	12,835	20.20%
1996	22,297	38.57%	27,890	48.25%	7,615	13.17%
2000	27,660	48.06%	27,984	48.62%	1,915	3.33%
2004	34,941	50.78%	33,535	48.74%	331	0.48%
2008	33,634	50.21%	31,958	47.71%	1,395	2.08%
2012	31,820	49.49%	31,297	48.67%	1,184	1.84%
2016	35,205	56.88%	23,328	37.69%	3,360	5.43%
2020	39,032	60.65%	24,076	37.41%	1,243	1.93%
2024	40,403	63.92%	21,847	34.56%	956	1.51%

United States Senate election results for Clark County, Ohio1
Year	Republican		Democratic		Third party(ies)	
Year	No.	%	No.	%	No.	%
2024	36,611	58.45%	23,630	37.73%	2,393	3.82%

== Education ==
=== Public school districts ===
Public school districts include:

- Clark - Shawnee Local School District
  - Shawnee High School, Springfield (the Braves)
- Greenon Local School District
  - Greenon High School, Springfield (the Knights)
- Northeastern Local School District
  - Kenton Ridge High School, Springfield (the Cougars)
  - Northeastern High School, Springfield (the Jets)
- Northwestern Local School District
  - Northwestern High School, Springfield (the Warriors)
- Southeastern Local Schools
  - Southeastern High School, South Charleston (the Trojans)
- Springfield City School District
  - Springfield High School, (the Wildcats)
- Tecumseh Local School District
  - Tecumseh High School, New Carlisle (the Arrows)

=== Colleges and Universities ===
- Clark State College, Springfield (the Eagles)
- Wittenberg University, Springfield (the Tigers)

== Communities ==
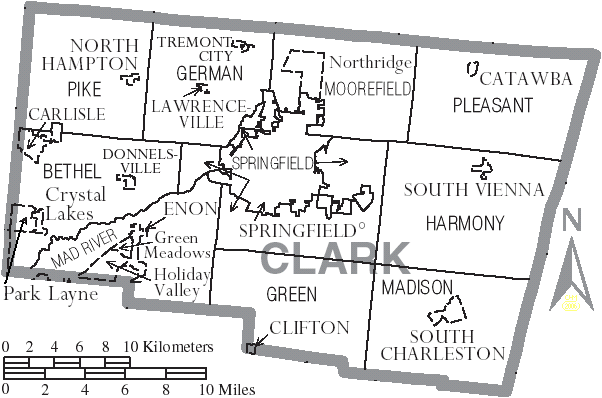
Map of Clark County, Ohio with Municipal and Township Labels

=== Cities ===
- New Carlisle
- Springfield (county seat)

=== Villages ===
- Catawba
- Clifton
- Donnelsville
- Enon
- North Hampton
- South Charleston
- South Vienna
- Tremont City

=== Townships ===
- Bethel
- German
- Green
- Harmony
- Mad River
- Madison
- Moorefield
- Pike
- Pleasant
- Springfield

=== Census-designated places ===
- Crystal Lakes
- Green Meadows
- Holiday Valley
- Lawrenceville
- Medway
- Northridge
- Park Layne

=== Unincorporated communities ===
- Beatty
- Brighton
- Cortsville
- Dialton
- Dodo
- Dolly Varden
- Durbin
- Eagle City
- Harmony
- Hustead
- Limestone City
- Lisbon
- Locustgrove
- New Moorefield
- Pitchin
- Plattsburgh
- Selma
- Sugar Grove
- Villa

== See also ==
- Clark County Public Library
- Clark County Heritage Center
- National Register of Historic Places listings in Clark County, Ohio
