= Bromide (disambiguation) =

Bromide is the anion of bromine, or any ionic salt containing bromide as the only anion, or (as a common name) any covalent compound containing bromine in the −1 oxidation state.

Bromide can also refer to:

== Science and technology ==
- Bromide paper, paper coated with an emulsion of silver bromide, used primarily for photographic prints
- Potassium bromide, an anticonvulsant and sedative (most pharmacologic information is here).
- Sodium bromide, an anticonvulsant and sedative

== Geography ==
- Bromide, Oklahoma, a small village in the southern central part of the state
- Bromide Basin, a basin in Utah

== Other uses ==
- Bromide (language), a figure of speech meaning a tranquilizing phrase, cliché or platitude used as a verbal sedative
- Bromide (Japanese culture), commercial photographic portraits of celebrities including geisha, singers, actors and sports-people
