= Moorefield Township, Clark County, Ohio =

Township in Ohio, US

- Township
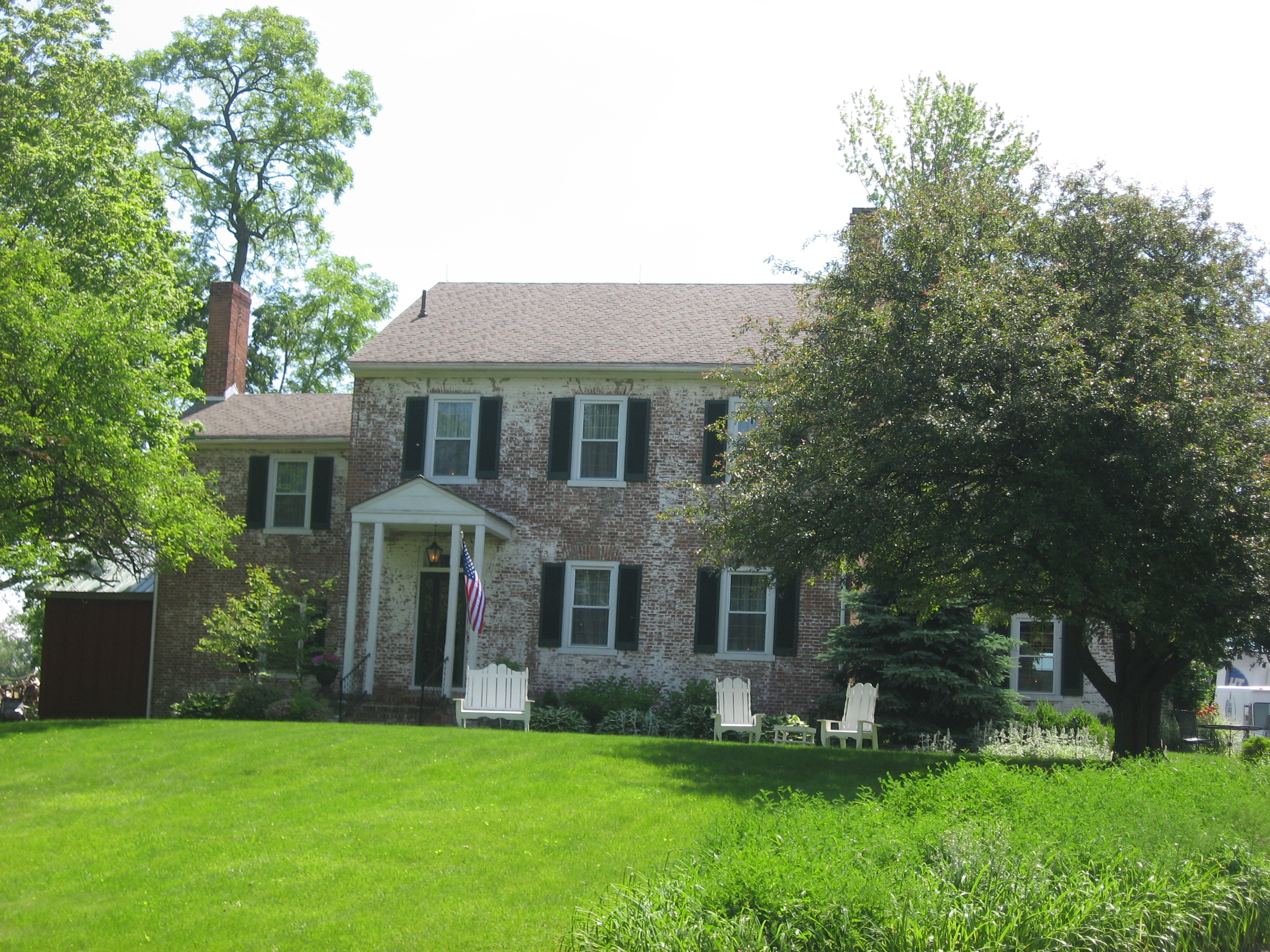
- The Kenton-Hunt Farm, a historic site in the township

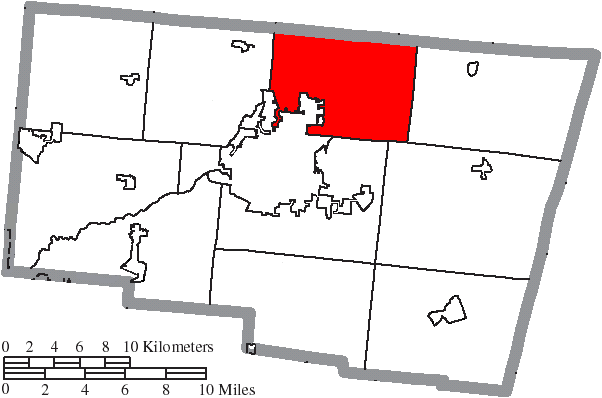
- Location of Moorefield Township in Clark County
- Coordinates: 39°59′0″N 83°46′3″W
- Country: United States
- State: Ohio
- County: Clark

Area
  - Total: 33.0 sq mi (85.5 km^{2})
  - Land: 29.9 sq mi (77.4 km^{2})
  - Water: 3.1 sq mi (8.1 km^{2})
- Elevation: 1,099 ft (335 m)

Population (2020)
  - Total: 12,622
  - Density: 422/sq mi (163/km^{2})
- Time zone: UTC-5 (Eastern (EST))
  - Summer (DST): UTC-4 (EDT)
- FIPS code: 39-51912
- GNIS feature ID: 1085856
- Website: moorefieldtownshipclark.gov

Moorefield Township is one of the ten townships of Clark County, Ohio, United States. The population as of the 2020 census was 12,622.

== Geography ==
Located in the northern part of the county, it borders the following townships:

- Urbana Township, Champaign County - north
- Union Township, Champaign County - northeast
- Pleasant Township - east
- Harmony Township - southeast
- Springfield Township - south
- German Township - west
- Mad River Township, Champaign County - northwest corner

Part of the city of Springfield, the county seat of Clark County, is located in southwestern Moorefield Township, and the census-designated place of Northridge is located in the township's west.

== Name and history ==
Moorefield Township was organized in 1818. It was named after Moorefield, West Virginia (then a city in Virginia), the former hometown of many of its first settlers.

Statewide, the only other Moorefield Township is located in Harrison County.

== Government ==
The township is governed by a three-member board of trustees, who are elected in November of odd-numbered years to a four-year term beginning on the following January 1. Two are elected in the year after the presidential election and one is elected in the year before it. There is also an elected township fiscal officer, who serves a four-year term beginning on April 1 of the year after the election, which is held in November of the year before the presidential election. Vacancies in the fiscal officership or on the board of trustees are filled by the remaining trustees.

== Schools ==
Most of the township is in the Northeastern Local School District. A small piece is in the Northwestern Local School District.

Moorefield Township is home to Kenton Ridge High School, Northeastern High School, Northridge Middle School, South Vienna Middle School, Rolling Hills Elementary School, Northridge Elementary School, and South Vienna Middle School. All of these are part of the Northeastern Local School District.
