= Harmony, Ohio =

Unincorporated community in Ohio, U.S.

Coordinates: 39°55′22″N 83°41′50″W

Harmony is an unincorporated community in Clark County, in the U.S. state of Ohio.

== History ==
Harmony was platted in 1832, and named after Harmony Township, in which it is located. A post office called Harmony was established in 1851, and discontinued in 1879.
