= Northridge, Ohio =

Northridge is the name of some places in the U.S. state of Ohio:

- Northridge, Clark County, Ohio
- Northridge, Montgomery County, Ohio
