= Cortsville, Ohio =

Unincorporated community in Ohio, U.S.

Coordinates: 39°47′47″N 83°43′16″W

Cortsville is an unincorporated community in Clark County, in the U.S. state of Ohio.

== History ==
The first settlement at Cortsville was made in 1830. A post office called Cortsville was established in 1837, and remained in operation until 1841. In 1881, Cortsville had 57 inhabitants.
