= Sugar Grove Township =

Sugar Grove Township is the name of several places in the United States:

- Sugar Grove Township, Kane County, Illinois
- Sugar Grove Township, Dallas County, Iowa
- Sugar Grove Township, Mercer County, Pennsylvania
- Sugar Grove Township, Warren County, Pennsylvania

== See also ==
- Sugar Grove (disambiguation)
