= Hustead, Ohio =

Unincorporated community in Ohio, U.S.

Coordinates: 39°50′26″N 83°51′47″W

Hustead is an unincorporated community in Clark County, in the U.S. state of Ohio.

== History ==
A post office called Hustead was established in 1868, and remained in operation until 1914. The community was named for the local Hustead family.
