= Pleasant Township, Clark County, Ohio =

Township in Ohio, US

- Township
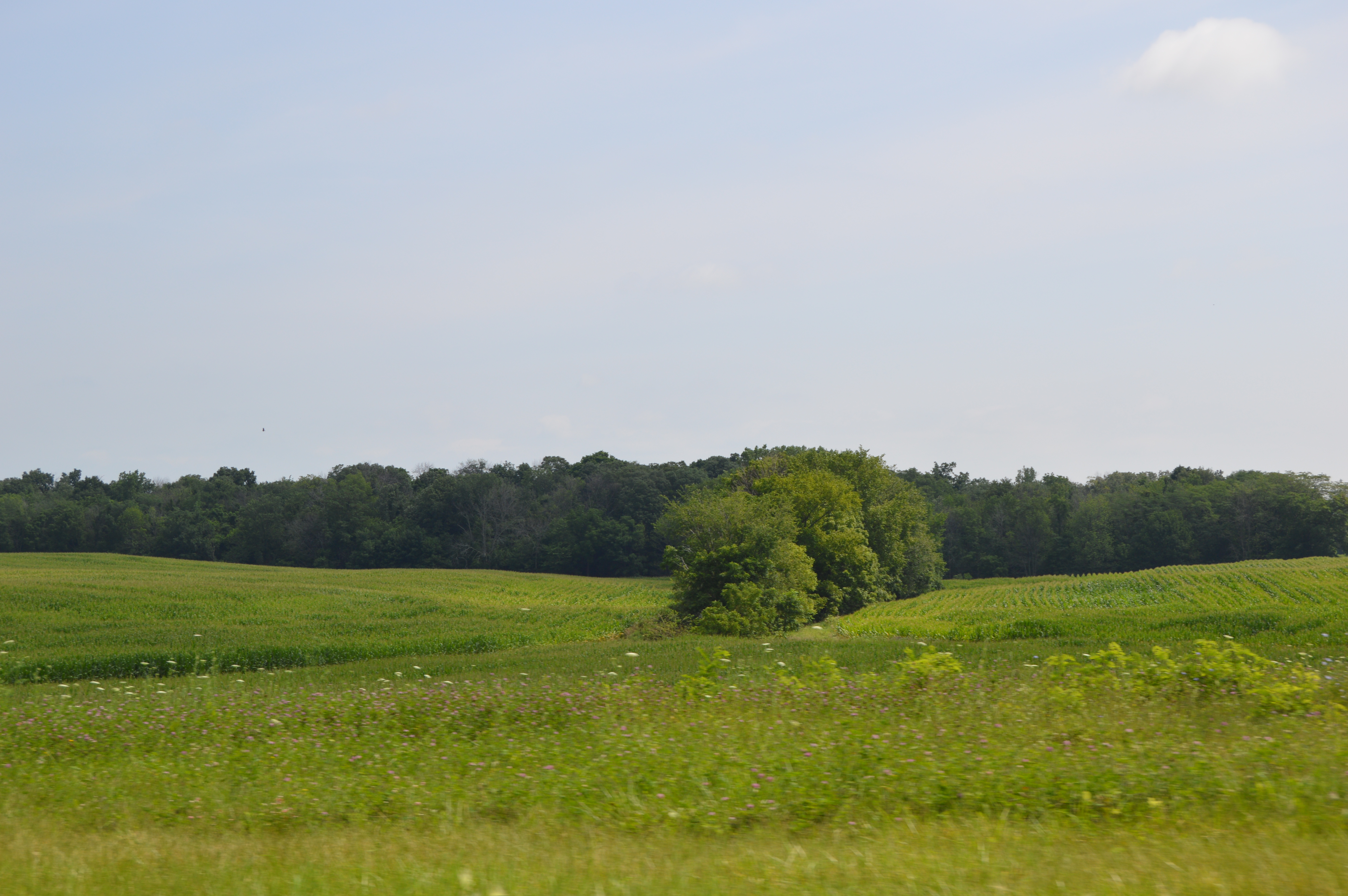
- Countryside east of Catawba

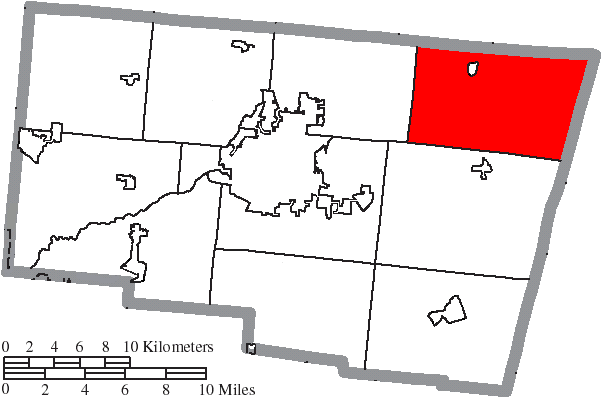
- Location of Pleasant Township in Clark County
- Coordinates: 39°58′33″N 83°36′37″W
- Country: United States
- State: Ohio
- County: Clark

Area
  - Total: 42.4 sq mi (109.8 km^{2})
  - Land: 42.2 sq mi (109.2 km^{2})
  - Water: 0.23 sq mi (0.6 km^{2})
- Elevation: 1,194 ft (364 m)

Population (2020)
  - Total: 3,143
  - Density: 74.55/sq mi (28.78/km^{2})
- Time zone: UTC-5 (Eastern (EST))
  - Summer (DST): UTC-4 (EDT)
- FIPS code: 39-63226
- GNIS feature ID: 1085858

Pleasant Township is one of the ten townships of Clark County, Ohio, United States. The 2020 census reported 3,143 people living in the township.

== Geography ==
Located in the northeastern corner of the county, it borders the following townships:

- Goshen Township, Champaign County - north
- Somerford Township, Madison County - east
- Harmony Township - south
- Moorefield Township - west
- Union Township, Champaign County - northwest

The village of Catawba is located in northern Pleasant Township.

== Name and history ==
It is one of fifteen Pleasant Townships statewide.

== Government ==
The township is governed by a three-member board of trustees, who are elected in November of odd-numbered years to a four-year term beginning on the following January 1. Two are elected in the year after the presidential election and one is elected in the year before it. There is also an elected township fiscal officer, who serves a four-year term beginning on April 1 of the year after the election, which is held in November of the year before the presidential election. Vacancies in the fiscal officership or on the board of trustees are filled by the remaining trustees.

== Education ==
It is in the Northeastern Local School District.
