= Durbin, Ohio =

Unincorporated community in Ohio, U.S.

Coordinates: 39°54′40″N 83°53′20″W

Durbin is an unincorporated community in Clark County, in the U.S. state of Ohio.

== History ==
Durbin had its start when the railroad was extended to that point. The community was named for General Durbin Ward, a railroad official.
