= Villa, Ohio =

Unincorporated community in Ohio, U.S.

Coordinates: 39°57′55″N 83°45′31″W

Villa is an unincorporated community in Clark County, in the U.S. state of Ohio.

== History ==
Villa was not officially platted. A post office called Villa was established in 1887, and remained in operation until 1903.
