= Lisbon, Clark County, Ohio =

Unincorporated community in Ohio, U.S.

Coordinates: 39°51′39″N 83°38′07″W

Lisbon is an unincorporated community in Harmony Township, Clark County, Ohio, US.

== History ==
Lisbon was laid out in 1815.
