= Clark County Courthouse (Ohio) =

Local government building in the United States

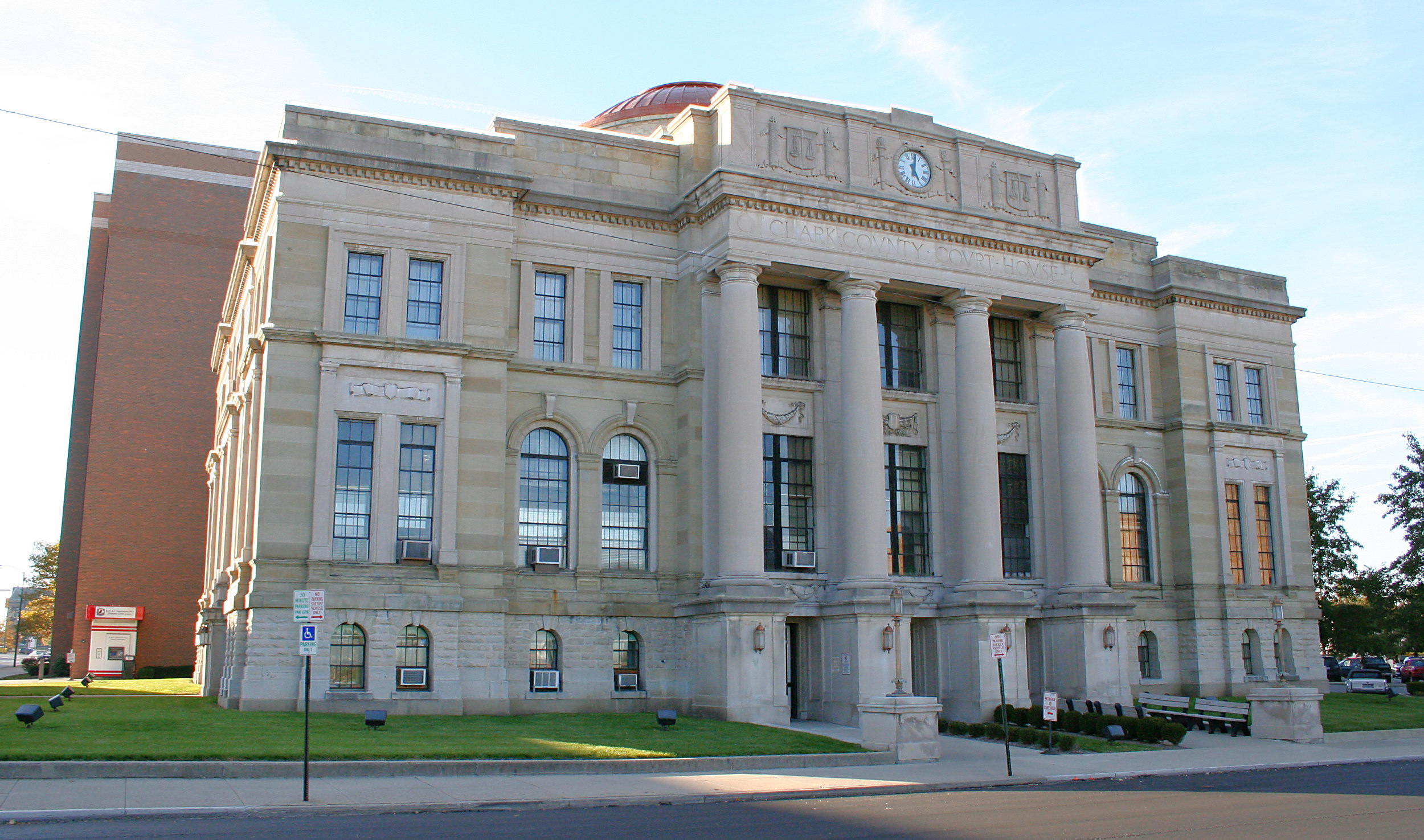
- Clark County Courthouse in Springfield, Ohio
- Interactive map of the Clark County Courthouse area

General information
- Architectural style: Romanesque
- Location: Springfield, Ohio, United States
- Coordinates: 39°55′37″N 83°48′15″W
- Construction started: 1918
- Completed: 1924
- Cost: $115,000
- Client: Clark County Commissioners

Design and construction
- Architect: William K. Schilling
- Engineer: Builder:

The Clark County Courthouse is located at the northwest corner of North Limestone and East Columbia Streets in Springfield, Ohio. The courthouse standing is the third for the county and is built over the foundations of the second.

== History ==
Clark County was established in 1818 and was carved from lands from Champaign, Greene, and Madison counties. The court met in various locations in Springfield but no budget allowed for the construction of a courthouse. In 1819, the commissioners were approached by a group of citizens who pledged $2,215 to the construction of a permanent courthouse. This first courthouse began construction and was due to be completed in 1820, but dragged on until 1828 and was designed by the architectural firm of Ambler & Fisher.

The building was based on the first capitol for Ohio at Chillicothe. The square building was built as a two-story red brick structure with three shuttered windows on both sides with white trim. The windows were recessed and set in an arch. Four large chimneys on each side protruded from the high hipped roof, which was mounted by a central cupola. The cupola consisted of a square base supporting an octagonal drum with a dome capped by a spire.

This courthouse served for 50 years until the demands of the county proved the courthouse too small. The old courthouse was sold in 1878 for $50.00 and was demolished so the new courthouse could be built on the site. Thomas J. Tolan & Son, Architects, of Fort Wayne Indiana, designed the new courthouse and Nathaniel Cregar, whose father, Charles Cregar, was studying with Tolan, was named as supervising contractor.

The new building was designed in the popular Second Empire style. The square building was constructed of limestone, with a rusticated foundation and smooth stone blocks above. The two story building is capped by a mansard roof with mansard towers at each corner with projecting dormers. The building's focus was on Columbia Street with large tower capped by a large spire and a four sided clock. An arched portico framed the entrance, which was reached by a flight of stairs. The courthouse caught fire about 1 o'clock on the morning of March 12, 1918, and destroyed the interior and most of the exterior. The court records were saved, as the county had implemented a policy of storing the records in a separate location.

== Exterior ==
The courthouse standing today is a mix of old and new, and was rebuilt from 1918-1924 by architect William K. Schilling. Parts of the exterior walls were saved from the 1918 fire and were reconstructed. The ground floor is still rusticated with smooth blocks on the first and second floors. The basement windows are small arched openings grouped in pairs. The first floor windows are large arched openings and are separated by Doric pilasters. The third floors contains long rectangular windows with no decoration and simple solid pilasters. Decorative panels and friezes separate the first and second floor windows.

The building lost its large front tower, stairs and mansard roof from the fire. The entrance has been changed to face Limestone Street and is now reached on the ground level; large pedestals on each side of the entrances support large Doric columns supporting a projected roof. An entablature runs along the building with the words "Clark County Court House" engraved above the entrance. A solid balustrade rests upon this entablature and contains decorative friezes above the entrance and a single clock face. A low dome rests in the center of the roof and is partially hidden by the entablature.
