= Beatty, Ohio =

Unincorporated community in Ohio, U.S.

Coordinates: 39°52′54″N 83°50′25″W

Beatty is an unincorporated community in Clark County, in the U.S. state of Ohio.

== History ==
Beatty was originally called Chambersburg; the present name was adopted when the post office was established. A post office called Beatty was established in 1888, and remained in operation until 1910.
