= Limestone City, Ohio =

Unincorporated community in Ohio, U.S.

Coordinates: 39°54′43″N 83°52′36″W

Limestone City is an unincorporated community in Clark County, in the U.S. state of Ohio.

== History ==
Limestone City was platted in 1886, and named for the local limestone-quarrying industry.
