= South Vienna, Ohio =

- Village
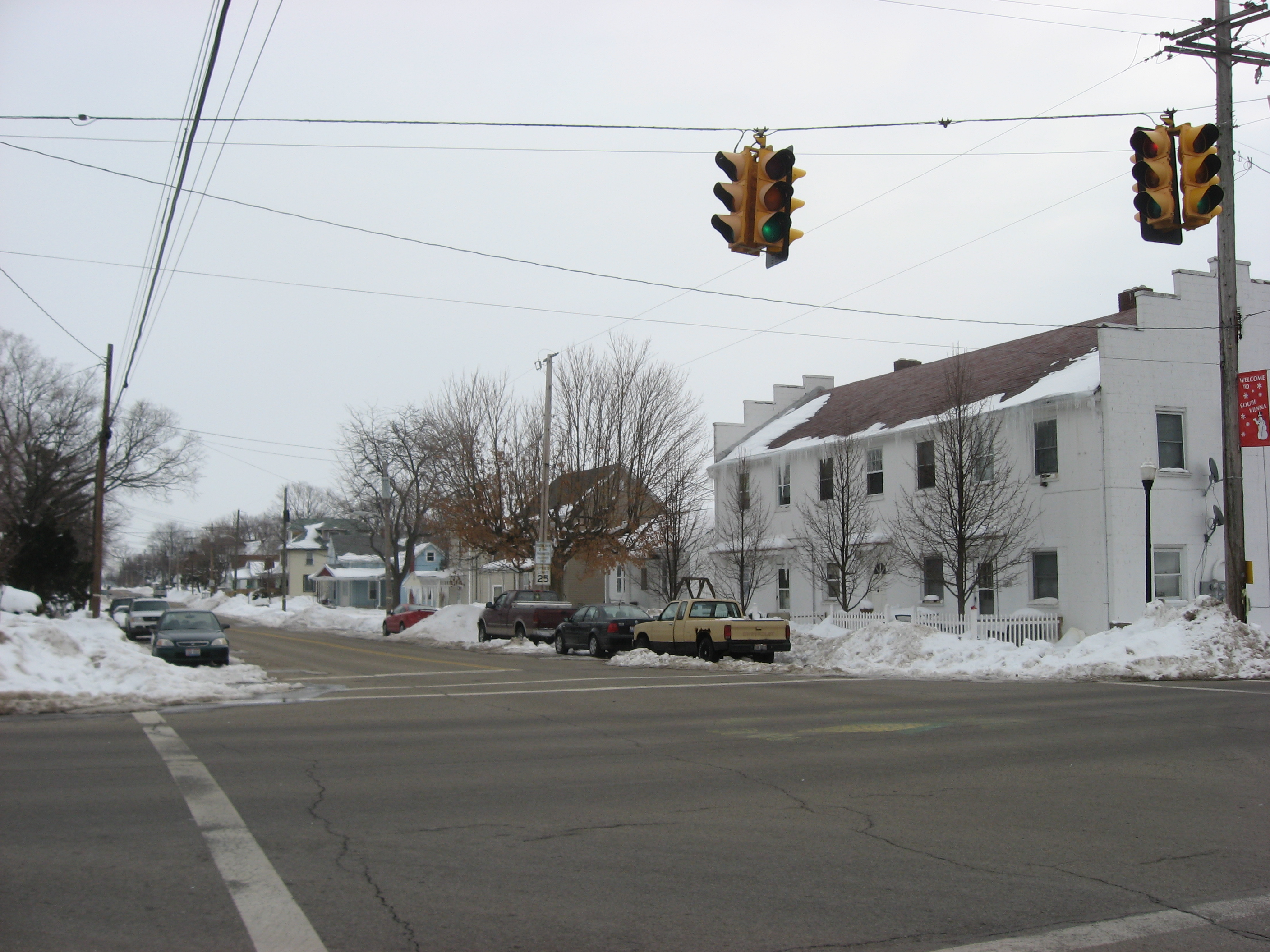
- Main Street in South Vienna

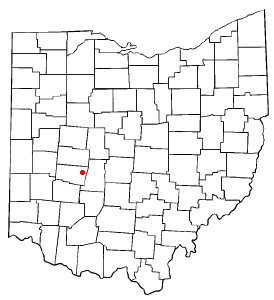
- Location of South Vienna, Ohio

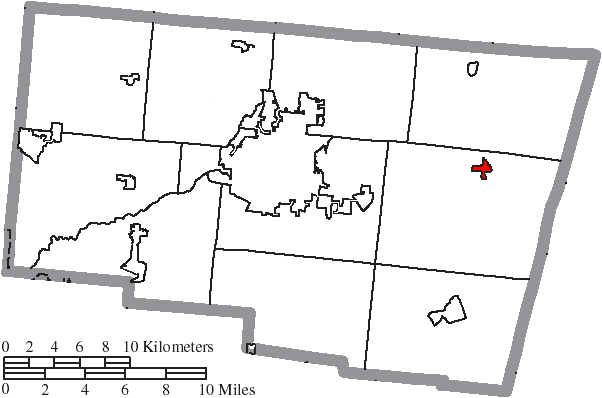
- Location of South Vienna in Clark County
- Coordinates: 39°55′47″N 83°37′12″W
- Country: United States
- State: Ohio
- County: Clark
- Township: Harmony

Government
  - Mayor: Toni Keller

Area
  - Total: 0.65 sq mi (1.69 km^{2})
  - Land: 0.65 sq mi (1.69 km^{2})
  - Water: 0 sq mi (0.00 km^{2})
- Elevation: 1,188 ft (362 m)

Population (2020)
  - Total: 402
  - Density: 617.4/sq mi (238.38/km^{2})
- Time zone: UTC-5 (Eastern (EST))
  - Summer (DST): UTC-4 (EDT)
- ZIP code: 45369
- Area codes: 937, 326
- FIPS code: 39-73796
- GNIS feature ID: 2399860
- Website: http://southvienna.org

South Vienna is a village in Clark County, Ohio, United States. The population was 402 at the 2020 census. It is part of the Springfield, Ohio Metropolitan Statistical Area.

Located about halfway between Dayton, OH and Columbus, the South Vienna Corn Festival is held in the area on the weekend after Labor Day. The village also has the distinction of having Permit #1, issued by the State of Ohio for traffic lights.

== History ==
South Vienna was originally called Vienna, and under the latter name was platted in 1833. A post office called Vienna Cross Roads was established in 1840, and the name was changed to South Vienna in 1909.

== Geography ==
According to the United States Census Bureau, the village has a total area of 0.52 square miles (1.35 km^{2}), all of it land.

== Demographics ==
Historical population
Census	Pop.	Note	%±
1910	368		—
1920	392		6.5%
1930	398		1.5%
1940	420		5.5%
1950	424		1.0%
1960	440		3.8%
1970	545		23.9%
1980	464		−14.9%
1990	550		18.5%
2000	469		−14.7%
2010	384		−18.1%
2020	402		4.7%
U.S. Decennial Census

=== 2010 census ===
As of the census of 2010, there were 384 people, 148 households, and 102 families living in the village. The population density was 738.5 inhabitants per square mile (285.1/km^{2}). There were 166 housing units at an average density of 319.2 per square mile (123.2/km^{2}). The racial makeup of the village was 90.4% White, 0.8% African American, 0.5% Native American, 0.5% Asian, 5.7% from other races, and 2.1% from two or more races. Hispanic or Latino of any race were 7.8% of the population.

There were 148 households, of which 35.1% had children under the age of 18 living with them, 48.0% were married couples living together, 16.2% had a female householder with no husband present, 4.7% had a male householder with no wife present, and 31.1% were non-families. 25.0% of all households were made up of individuals, and 8.8% had someone living alone who was 65 years of age or older. The average household size was 2.59 and the average family size was 2.98.

The median age in the village was 40.7 years. 26.8% of residents were under the age of 18; 8.9% were between the ages of 18 and 24; 20.4% were from 25 to 44; 34.4% were from 45 to 64; and 9.6% were 65 years of age or older. The gender makeup of the village was 48.4% male and 51.6% female.

=== 2000 census ===
As of the census of 2000, there were 469 people, 166 households, and 131 families living in the village. The population density was 1,157.8 inhabitants per square mile (447.0/km^{2}). There were 173 housing units at an average density of 427.1 per square mile (164.9/km^{2}). The racial makeup of the village was 97.65% White, 0.21% African American, 0.85% from other races, and 1.28% from two or more races. Hispanic or Latino of any race were 2.13% of the population.

There were 166 households, out of which 41.0% had children under the age of 18 living with them, 60.2% were married couples living together, 15.7% had a female householder with no husband present, and 20.5% were non-families. 16.9% of all households were made up of individuals, and 5.4% had someone living alone who was 65 years of age or older. The average household size was 2.83 and the average family size was 3.16.

In the village, the population was spread out, with 32.6% under the age of 18, 8.1% from 18 to 24, 28.4% from 25 to 44, 19.6% from 45 to 64, and 11.3% who were 65 years of age or older. The median age was 32 years. For every 100 females there were 92.2 males. For every 100 females age 18 and over, there were 87.0 males.

The median income for a household in the village was $40,625, and the median income for a family was $51,875. Males had a median income of $36,389 versus $25,833 for females. The per capita income for the village was $17,271. About 8.5% of families and 8.2% of the population were below the poverty line, including 1.3% of those under age 18 and 17.9% of those age 65 or over.

== Education ==
It is in the Northeastern Local School District.

Northeastern Elementary School and Northeastern Middle and High School are in South Vienna.

== Notable people ==
- Chris Daugherty - the winner of Survivor: Vanuatu
- Harvey Haddix - baseball pitcher lived in South Vienna during his playing career in the 1960s.
- Jenny Mae - indie rock singer-songwriter
