= Kenton Ridge Middle and High School =

Kenton Ridge High School
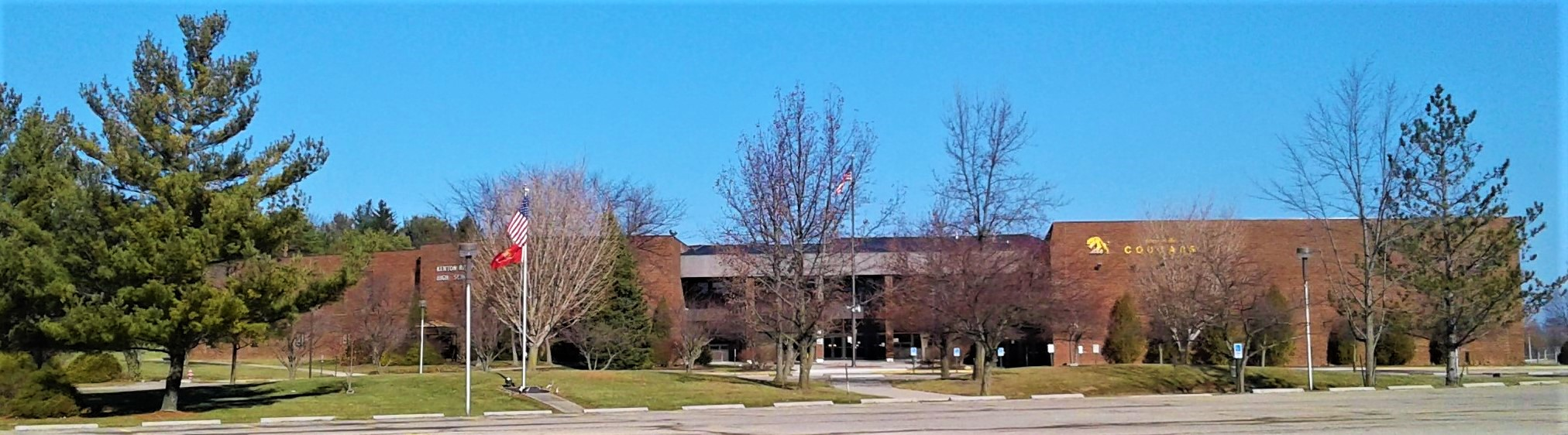

Location
- 4444 Middle Urbana Road; Springfield, Clark County, Ohio 45503; United States; 39°59′11″N 83°45′44″W

Information
- Type: Public, coeducational
- Established: 1977
- School district: Northeastern Local School District
- Superintendent: John P. Kronour
- Principal: John Hill
- Teaching staff: 53.92 (FTE)
- Grades: 6-12
- Student to teacher ratio: 15.65
- Colors: Brown and gold
- Athletics conference: Central Buckeye Conference
- Nickname: Cougs
- Team name: Cougars
- Website: https://krhs.nelsd.org/

Kenton Ridge Middle and High School is a public middle school and high school in Moorefield Township, Clark County, Ohio, near Springfield. It is one of two secondary schools in the Northeastern Local School District, along with Northeastern Middle and High School.

== Awards and recognition ==
Kenton Ridge High School has won the following Ohio High School Athletic Association state championships:

- Boys' bowling – 2009, 2010
- Boys' golf - 2011
- Girls' bowling - 2024
- Girls' softball - 2025, 2026

The Kenton Ridge marching band performed in the 2012 Macy's Thanksgiving Day Parade and was in the virtual Parade Across America for the inauguration of President Joe Biden in 2021.

== Notable alumni ==
- Dave Burba, former MLB player (Seattle Mariners, San Francisco Giants, Cincinnati Reds, Cleveland Indians, Texas Rangers, Milwaukee Brewers) and current Minor League Baseball coach (Hartford Yard Goats)
- Adam Eaton, former MLB player (Arizona Diamondbacks, Chicago White Sox, Washington Nationals)
- Jan Finney, softball player; professional MMA fighter
- Dustin Hermanson, former MLB player (San Diego Padres, Montreal Expos, St. Louis Cardinals, Boston Red Sox, San Francisco Giants, Chicago White Sox)
- Chris Via, professional bowler on the PBA Tour, who has won the 2016 U.S. Amateur Championship and the 2021 U.S. Open
- Rick White, former MLB player (Pittsburgh Pirates, Tampa Bay Devil Rays, New York Mets, Saint Louis Cardinals, Colorado Rockies, Houston Astros, Chicago White Sox, Cleveland Indians, Philadelphia Phillies, Cincinnati Reds, Seattle Mariners)
- Andy Wilson, 52nd Attorney General of Ohio
