= Locustgrove, Ohio =

- Unincorporated community
- Location within Ohio Location within the United States
- Coordinates: 39°53′15″N 83°45′16″W
- Country: United States
- State: Ohio
- County: Clark
- Elevation: 1,040 ft (320 m)
- Time zone: UTC-5 (Eastern (EST))
  - Summer (DST): UTC-4 (EDT)
- Area codes: 937, 326
- GNIS feature ID: 1061289

Locustgrove is an unincorporated community in Clark County, Ohio, United States. Locustgrove is 3.8 miles (6.1 km) southeast of Springfield.
