= New Moorefield, Ohio =

Unincorporated community in Ohio, U.S.

Coordinates: 39°59′31″N 83°43′02″W

New Moorefield is an unincorporated community in Clark County, in the U.S. state of Ohio.

== History ==
New Moorefield was first built up in the 1840s when a sawmill and gristmill were started there. A post office called New Moorefield was established in 1866, and remained in operation until 1926.
