= Pitchin, Ohio =

Unincorporated community in Ohio, U.S.

Coordinates: 39°50′34″N 83°45′45″W

Pitchin is an unincorporated community in Green Township, Clark County, in the U.S. state of Ohio. Pitchin is located 6 miles south of Springfield, Ohio.

== History ==
The first permanent settlement at Pitchin was made in the 1840s when several houses and shops were built there. A sawmill was built at the site in 1854. According to tradition, the town's name is derived from an idiom, specifically "pitch in". Some say the proprietor of a mill told all job seekers to "pitch in" and help him build the mill, while others believe a merchant invited townspeople to "pitch in" and help him drink a keg of beer at his new store. A post office called Pitchin was established in 1884, and remained in operation until 1903.
