= Eagle City, Utah =

- Ghost town
- Location within Utah Location within the United States
- Coordinates: 38°04′12″N 110°44′48″W
- Country: United States
- State: Utah
- County: Garfield
- Founded: 1890
- Abandoned: 1970s
- Elevation: 7,789 ft (2,374 m)
- GNIS feature ID: 1435476

Eagle City is a ghost town located in Garfield County, Utah, United States. Nestled in Bromide Basin, high in the remote Henry Mountains of southern Utah, it was a gold mining camp. Eagle City was settled circa 1890, but was almost abandoned by the start of World War I. A single resident remained until the 1970s.

== History ==
In 1889 a pair of prospectors discovered gold deposits in the Bromide Basin area, setting off a small gold rush. Owners of the Bromide and Oro mines built mills on Crescent Creek, where a small town grew up. Eagle City soon had a store, hotel, doctor's office, and saloon. As many as 100 people lived here at one point. Eagle City had a rough reputation, and members of Butch Cassidy's Wild Bunch were known to visit.

As the mine shafts reached the 300-foot (91 m) depth, the mines began to fill with water. A 3,000-foot (910 m) drain tunnel was planned, but never completed due to lack of capital. In 1911 the Bromide Mill burned down. Soon World War I took most of the remaining young men. Only Frank Lawler stayed behind at Eagle City. He lived there alone for the next 60 years, searching for the legendary Lost Josephine Mine.

== Sources ==
- Thompson, George A. (November 1982). Some Dreams Die: Utah's Ghost Towns and Lost Treasures. Salt Lake City: Dream Garden Press. p. 77. ISBN 0-942688-01-5.
