= Eagle City, Ohio =

Unincorporated community in Ohio, U.S.

Coordinates: 39°58′37″N 83°50′05″W

Eagle City is an unincorporated community in Clark County, in the U.S. state of Ohio.

== History ==
A post office called Eagle City was established in 1879, and remained in operation until 1901. Besides the post office, Eagle City had a mill, and the place was originally called Baker Mills before the post office was established.
