= Sugar Grove, Clark County, Ohio =

Unincorporated community in Ohio, U.S.

Coordinates: 39°55′33″N 83°51′42″W

Sugar Grove is an unincorporated community in Clark County, Ohio, US.

== History ==
Sugar Grove was laid out in 1874.
