= Union Township, Champaign County, Ohio =

Township in Ohio, US

- Township
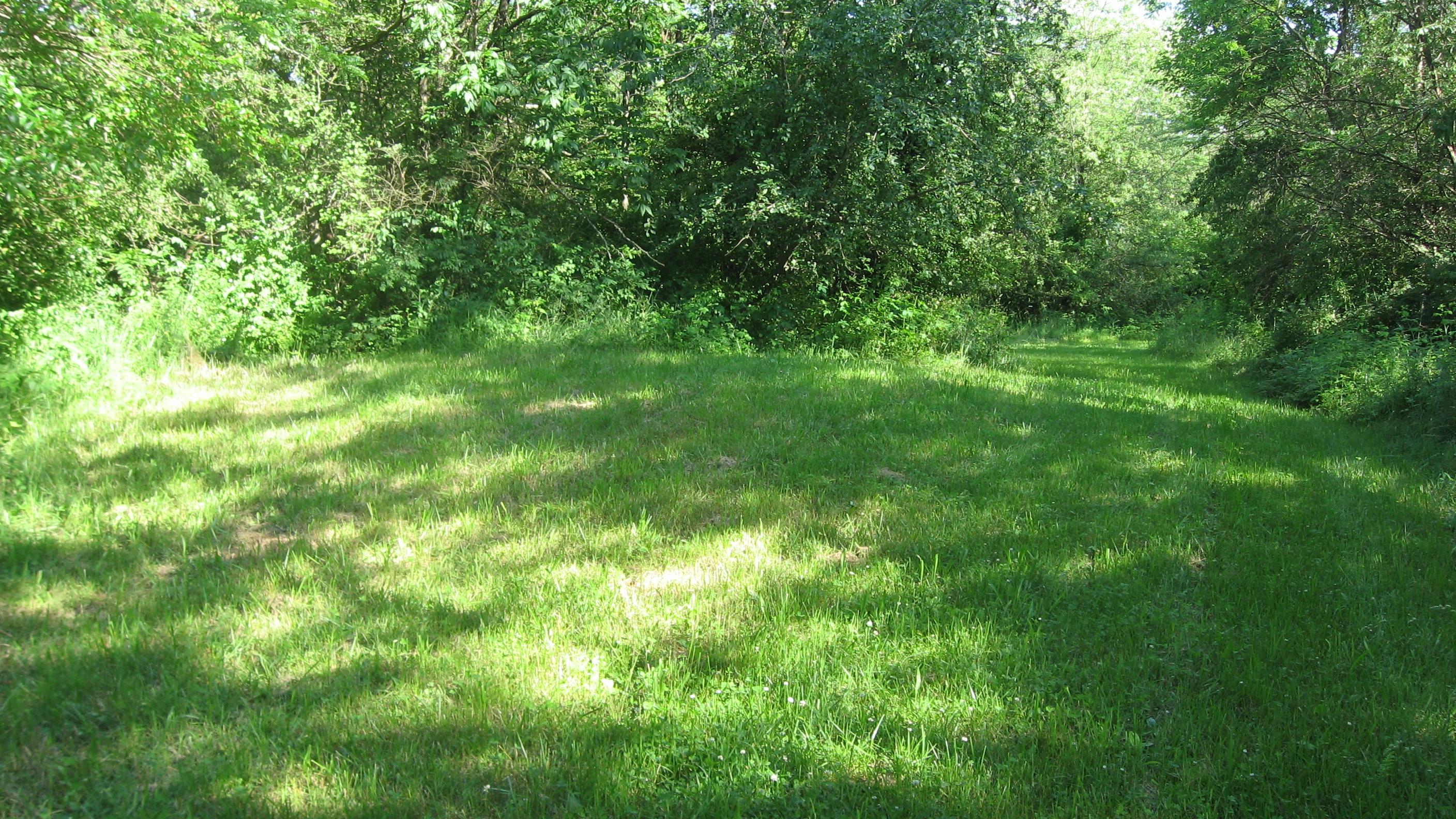
- The Carl Potter Mound, a prehistoric Indian mound

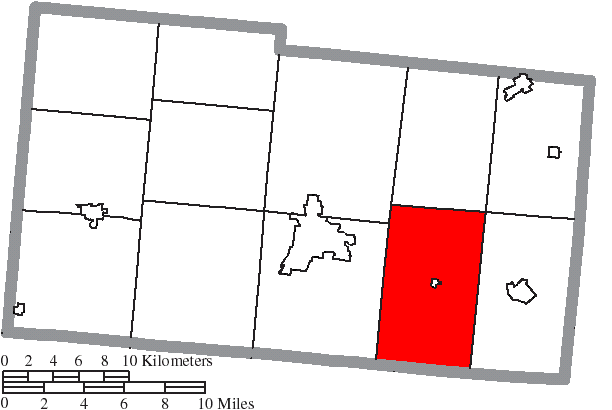
- Location of Union Township in Champaign County
- Coordinates: 40°4′40″N 83°38′24″W
- Country: United States
- State: Ohio
- County: Champaign

Area
  - Total: 37.59 sq mi (97.35 km^{2})
  - Land: 37.56 sq mi (97.28 km^{2})
  - Water: 0.027 sq mi (0.07 km^{2})
- Elevation: 1,194 ft (364 m)

Population (2020)
  - Total: 2,112
  - Density: 56.23/sq mi (21.71/km^{2})
- Time zone: UTC-5 (Eastern (EST))
  - Summer (DST): UTC-4 (EDT)
- FIPS code: 39-78274
- GNIS feature ID: 1085847

Union Township is one of the twelve townships of Champaign County, Ohio, United States. The 2020 census reported 2,112 people living in the township.

== Geography ==
Located in the southeastern part of the county, it borders the following townships:

- Wayne Township - north
- Rush Township - northeast corner
- Goshen Township - east
- Pleasant Township, Clark County - south
- Moorefield Township, Clark County - southwest
- Urbana Township - west
- Salem Township - northwest

The village of Mutual is located in the center of the township.

== Name and history ==
Union Township was established about 1805, but since the records were lost the exact date is likely unknown.

It is one of twenty-seven Union Townships statewide.

Union Township is the location of a Native American mound, the Carl Potter Mound. Believed to be a work of the Adena culture, the mound is an archaeological site and is listed on the National Register of Historic Places.

== Government ==
The township is governed by a three-member board of trustees, who are elected in November of odd-numbered years to a four-year term beginning on the following January 1. Two are elected in the year after the presidential election and one is elected in the year before it. There is also an elected township fiscal officer, who serves a four-year term beginning on April 1 of the year after the election, which is held in November of the year before the presidential election. Vacancies in the fiscal officership or on the board of trustees are filled by the remaining trustees.
