= Dialton, Ohio =

Unincorporated community in Ohio, U.S.

Coordinates: 40°01′38″N 83°56′26″W

Dialton is an unincorporated community in Clark County, in the U.S. state of Ohio.

== History ==
Dialton had its start in 1851 when a sawmill was built there. A post office called Dialton was established in 1865, and remained in operation until 1901. The community was named for Judge Dial, who was instrumental in securing the post office for the town.
