= Dodo, Ohio =

Unincorporated community in Ohio, U.S.

Coordinates: 39°59′00″N 83°59′34″W

Dodo is an unincorporated community in Clark County, in the U.S. state of Ohio.

== History ==
A gristmill was started in 1814 on Honey Creek at the site of what is now Dodo. A post office called Dodo was established in 1884, and remained in operation until 1901.
