= Northeastern Middle and High School =

Location
- 1480 Bowman Road; South Vienna, (Clark County), Ohio 45502-8805; United States; 39°56′28″N 83°40′49″W

Information
- Type: Public, Coeducational high school
- School district: NELSD
- Principal: Todd Justice
- Teaching staff: 33.00 (FTE)
- Grades: 6-12
- Student to teacher ratio: 12.91
- Colors: Cardinal and Gold
- Athletics conference: Ohio Heritage Conference
- Mascot: Jets
- Team name: Jets
- Website: https://nehs.nelsd.org/
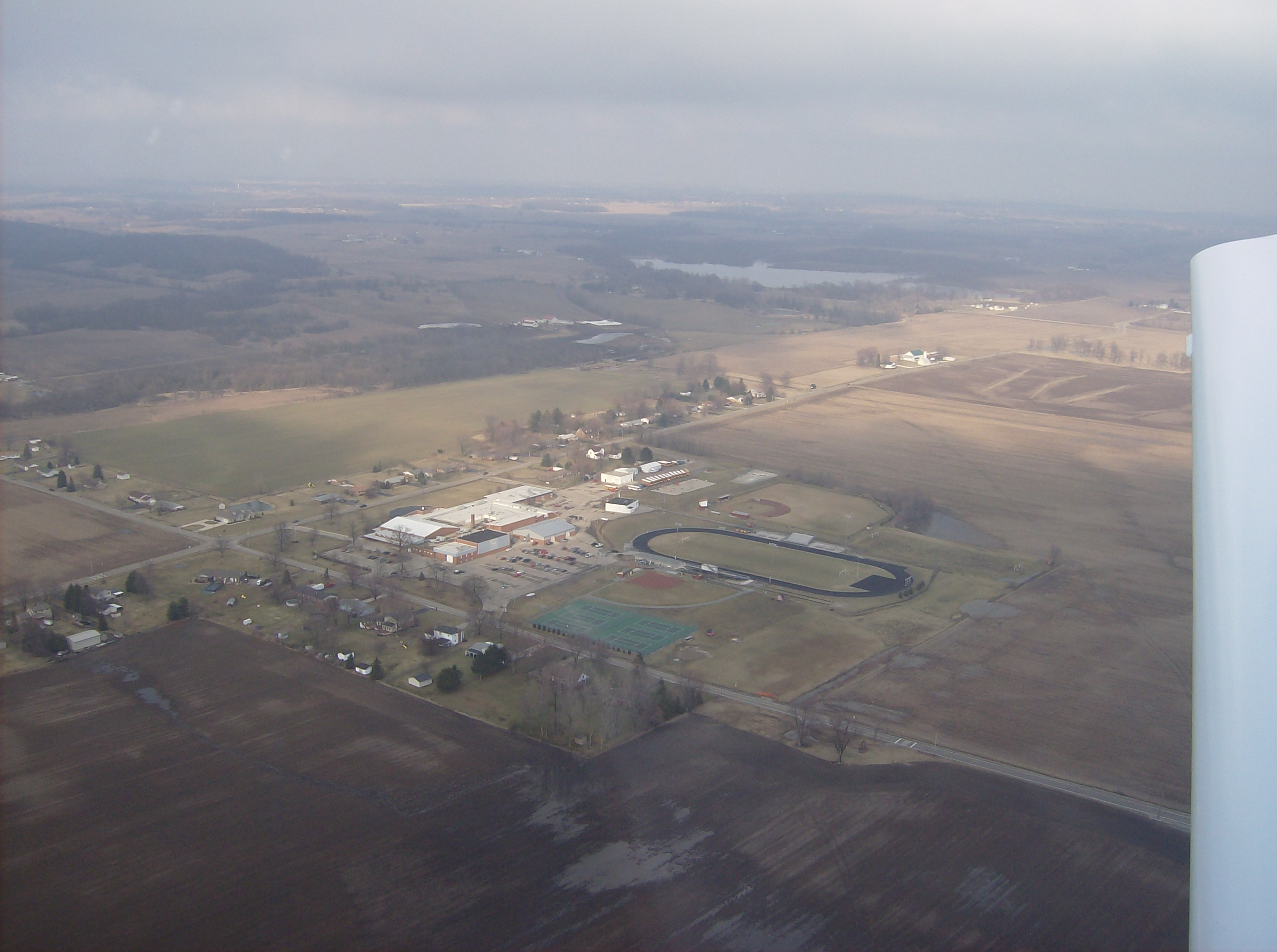
- The school seen from the south

Northeastern Middle and High School is a public middle school and high school in South Vienna, Ohio, United States. It is one of two secondary schools in the Northeastern Local School District, the other school being Kenton Ridge Middle and High School.

== State championships ==
Northeastern High School has won the following Ohio High School Athletic Association state championship:

- Boys Basketball – 1923*

* Title won by Plattsburgh High School prior to consolidation into Northeastern in 1952.
