= Northridge, Clark County, Ohio =

Northridge, Ohio
- Census-designated place
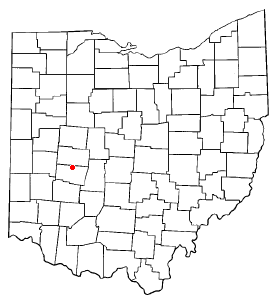
- Location of Northridge, Clark County, Ohio
- Coordinates: 40°00′05″N 83°46′43″W
- Country: United States
- State: Ohio
- County: Clark
- Township: Moorefield

Area
  - Total: 3.06 sq mi (7.93 km^{2})
  - Land: 3.06 sq mi (7.93 km^{2})
  - Water: 0 sq mi (0.00 km^{2})
- Elevation: 1,102 ft (336 m)

Population (2023)
  - Total: 8,369
  - Density: 2,454.2/sq mi (947.56/km^{2})
- Time zone: UTC-5 (Eastern (EST))
  - Summer (DST): UTC-4 (EDT)
- FIPS code: 39-56938
- GNIS feature ID: 2393159

Northridge is a census-designated place (CDP) in Clark County, Ohio, United States. The population was 7,518 at the 2020 census. It is part of the Springfield, Ohio Metropolitan Statistical Area.

== Geography ==
Northridge is located in north-central Clark County in the western part of Moorefield Township. It is bordered to the south by the city of Springfield. Ohio State Route 334 crosses the southern tip of the CDP, leading east to Ohio State Route 4 and west to U.S. Route 68. Ohio State Route 72 (Urbana Road) forms part of the western edge of the CDP. The center of Springfield is about 6 miles (10 km) south of the center of Northridge.

According to the United States Census Bureau, the CDP has a total area of 3.1 square miles (7.9 km^{2}), all of it land.

== Demographics ==
Historical population
Census	Pop.	Note	%±
2020	7,518		—
U.S. Decennial Census

As of the census of 2000, there were 6,853 people, 2,828 households, and 2,101 families residing in the CDP. The population density was 2,244.7 inhabitants per square mile (866.7/km^{2}). There were 2,905 housing units at an average density of 951.5 per square mile (367.4/km^{2}). The racial makeup of the CDP was 97.78% White, 1.21% African American, 0.35% Asian, 0.07% from other races, and 0.58% from two or more races. Hispanic or Latino of any race were 0.48% of the population.

There were 2,828 households, out of which 29.0% had children under the age of 18 living with them, 63.9% were married couples living together, 8.3% had a female householder with no husband present, and 25.7% were non-families. 23.2% of all households were made up of individuals, and 12.9% had someone living alone who was 65 years of age or older. The average household size was 2.42 and the average family size was 2.84.

In the CDP the population was spread out, with 23.0% under the age of 18, 5.5% from 18 to 24, 24.4% from 25 to 44, 29.1% from 45 to 64, and 18.1% who were 65 years of age or older. The median age was 43 years. For every 100 females there were 92.2 males. For every 100 females age 18 and over, there were 87.8 males.

The median income for a household in the CDP was $50,100, and the median income for a family was $57,672. Males had a median income of $42,410 versus $24,485 for females. The per capita income for the CDP was $21,555. About 1.2% of families and 2.4% of the population were below the poverty line, including 2.4% of those under age 18 and 4.9% of those age 65 or over.

== Education ==
It is in the Northeastern Local School District.
