= Selma, Ohio =

Unincorporated community in Ohio, U.S.

Coordinates: 39°47′12″N 83°42′31″W

Selma is an unincorporated community in Madison Township, Clark County, Ohio, USA.

== History ==
Selma was platted in 1842 when the Xenia and Columbus Pike was extended to that point. A post office called Selma was established in 1841, and remained in operation until 1967. Selma was a station on the Underground Railroad.
