= Bromide Basin =

Basin in Utah, United States

Coordinates: 38.0652633°N 110.7904314°W

Bromide Basin (elevation 10,269 ft [3,130 m]) is a basin in Garfield County, Utah, United States.

Bromide Basin took its name from a nearby mine which was originally erroneously thought to contain bromide ore.
