= Harmony Township, Clark County, Ohio =

Township in Ohio, US

- Township
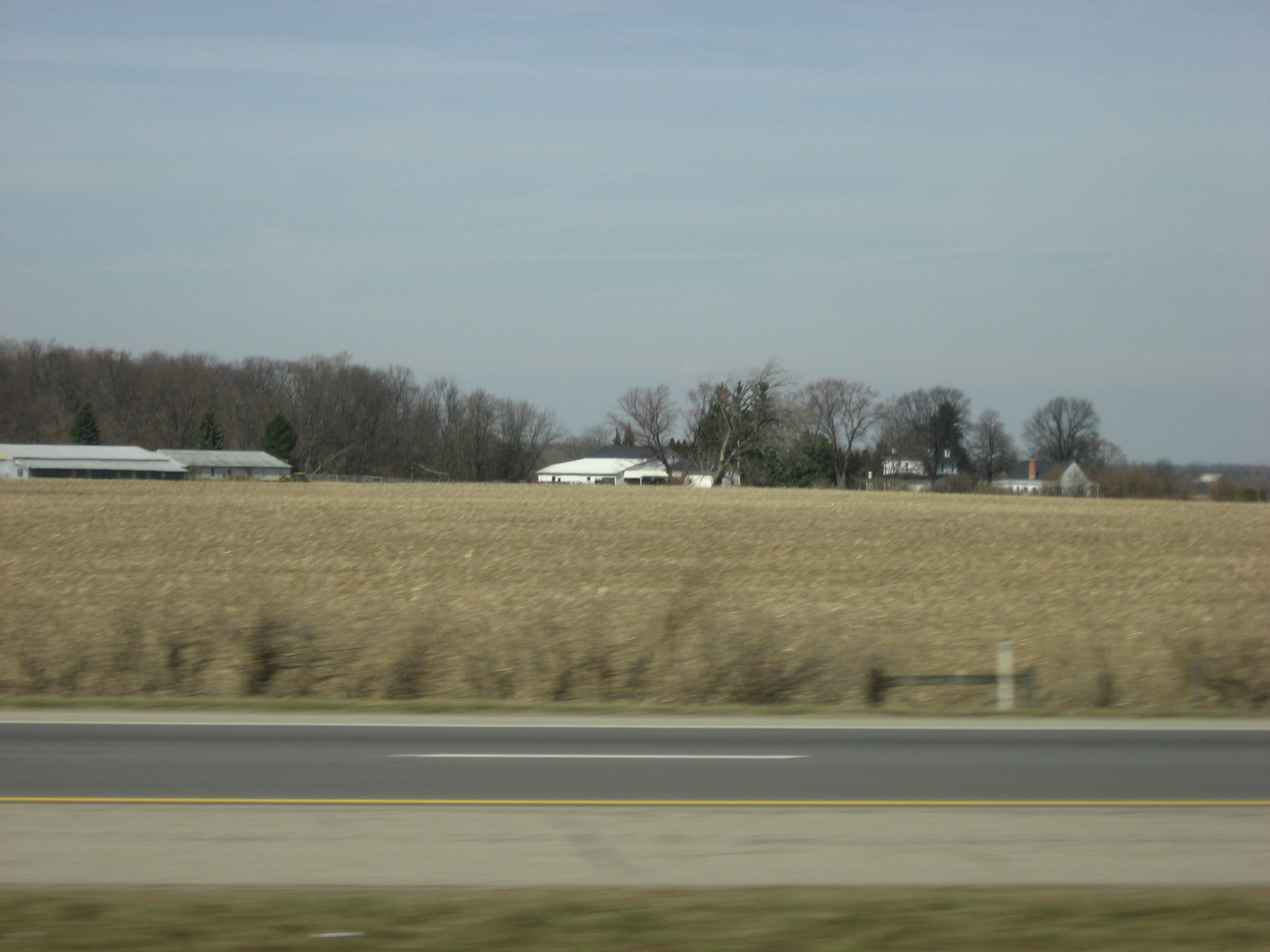
- Fields in western Harmony Township

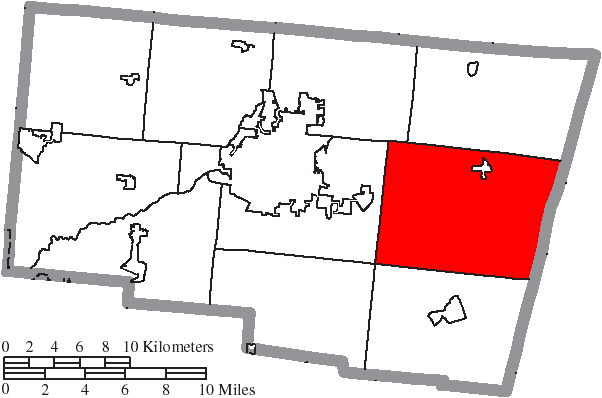
- Location of Harmony Township in Clark County
- Coordinates: 39°54′25″N 83°37′41″W
- Country: United States
- State: Ohio
- County: Clark

Area
  - Total: 51.0 sq mi (132.0 km^{2})
  - Land: 50.8 sq mi (131.6 km^{2})
  - Water: 0.15 sq mi (0.4 km^{2})
- Elevation: 1,109 ft (338 m)

Population (2020)
  - Total: 3,652
  - Density: 71.87/sq mi (27.75/km^{2})
- Time zone: UTC-5 (Eastern (EST))
  - Summer (DST): UTC-4 (EDT)
- FIPS code: 39-33586
- GNIS feature ID: 1085853

Harmony Township is one of the ten townships of Clark County, Ohio, United States. The 2020 census reported 3,652 people living in the township.

== Geography ==
Located in the eastern part of the county, it borders the following townships:

- Pleasant Township - north
- Somerford Township, Madison County - northeast
- Union Township, Madison County - east
- Paint Township, Madison County - southeast
- Madison Township - south
- Green Township - southwest corner
- Springfield Township - west
- Moorefield Township - northwest

The village of South Vienna is located in the northern part of the township, and the unincorporated community of Plattsburgh lies at the center of the township.

== Name and history ==
Harmony Township was founded in 1818.

Statewide, the only other Harmony Township is located in Morrow County.

== Government ==
The township is governed by a three-member board of trustees, who are elected in November of odd-numbered years to a four-year term beginning on the following January 1. Two are elected in the year after the presidential election and one is elected in the year before it. There is also an elected township fiscal officer, who serves a four-year term beginning on April 1 of the year after the election, which is held in November of the year before the presidential election. Vacancies in the fiscal officership or on the board of trustees are filled by the remaining trustees.
