= Urbana Junior High =

Urbana Junior High School

Location
- 500 Washington Avenue; Urbana, (Champaign County), Ohio 43078; United States
- Coordinates: 40°6′46″N 83°44′34″W

Information
- Type: Public, Coeducational junior high school
- School district: Urbana City Schools
- Superintendent: Charles Thiel
- Principal: Cheryl Carter and Jason Shultz
- Grades: 6-8
- Colors: Maroon and White
- Fight song: Across the Field
- Athletics: Football, Cross Country, Basketball, Volleyball, Track & Field, and Wrestling
- Athletics conference: Central Buckeye Conference
- Mascot: Sparky
- Nickname: Climbers
- Team name: Hillclimbers
- Rival: Bellefontaine High School; Graham High School
- Accreditation: North Central Association of Colleges and Schools
- Athletic Director: Dan Shay
- Website: www.urbanacityschools.org/2/home

Urbana Junior High School located at 500 Washington Ave, Urbana, Ohio, on top of the "hill" as the locals say. It is located between Washington Ave. and Carson Street. It is one of 6 schools in the Urbana City School District, the other schools in the Urbana City Schools district are North elementary, South elementary, East elementary, Local intermediate, and Urbana High School. It is the only feeder school for Urbana High School

Urbana Junior High was rated Excellent by the Ohio Department of Education for the 2010–2011, and 2011-2012 school years.

Currently grades 7 and 8 attend Urbana Junior High School. It was announced at the April 21st, 2012 Board of Education meeting that Urbana Local would be closing at the end of the 2012–2013 school year and Urbana Junior High will house grades 6–8. This was part of a 1.1 million dollar cost saving measure instituted by Urbana City Schools to help balance the 2013-2014 school budget.

The current principal is Joanne Petty. She began her principalship in August 2012 upon the request of Urbana City Schools Superintendent, Mr. Charles Thiel. Mrs. Petty was formerly the Principal of Urbana Local Elementary (grades 5 and 6). Mr. Greg Stickel proceeded Mrs. Petty in guiding Urbana Junior High. Mr. Stickel was principal from 2009 to 2012. Greg Stickel is currently the principal at West Muskingum Middle School in Ohio. Mr Stickel assumed the principal duties from Kris Mays in the summer of 2009 as Kris Mays was assigned to Urbana High School Principal.

The students of Urbana Junior High have the opportunity to participate in a variety of extracurricular activities. The sports teams participate under the guidelines established by the Ohio High School Athletic Association. Urbana Junior High currently offers football, volleyball, boys and girls basketball, wrestling, cheer leading, and track.
