= Shawnee High School (Springfield Township, Clark County, Ohio) =

Shawnee Middle and High School

Location
- 1675 East Possum Road; Springfield, (Clark County), Ohio 45502; United States; 39°52′13″N 83°46′51″W

Information
- Type: Public, Coeducational
- Motto: "Where Excellence Is a Tradition"
- Superintendent: Brian Kuhn
- Principal: Michelle Heims (Campus), Devin Spitzer (MS), John Stekli (HS)
- Grades: 7-12
- Colors: Black and Gold
- Fight song: Buckeye Battle Cry
- Athletics conference: Central Buckeye Conference
- Mascot: Braves
- Rival: Kenton Ridge High School, Northwestern High School, Tecumseh High School, Urbana High School, Indian Lake High School
- Yearbook: Shawano
- Website: School Website

Shawnee High School is a public high school in Springfield Township, Clark County, Ohio, near Springfield. It is the only high school in the Clark-Shawnee Local School District. The high school offers college preparatory classes along with many different programs in sports, band, drama, foreign languages, and music. Students and alumni are known as "The Shawnee Braves." The high school campus is located on East Possum Road in Springfield, Ohio. Springfield is located about 50 miles west of Columbus, Ohio, and about 35 miles east of Dayton, Ohio. The school that generally feeds into Shawnee is Shawnee Elementary School in Clark County.

== Ohio High School Athletic Association State Championships ==
- Girls Track and Field – 1992
- Boys Cross Country - 2011
- Football - 2011 (State Runners-Up, Division III)

== Notable alumni ==
- Kevin Donley (1969), college football head coach
- Michelle Gorelow (1989), politician
- Brittany Smart (2003), basketball player
- Elle Smith (2016), model, journalist, and Miss USA 2021
