= Central Buckeye Conference =

High school athletic league in Ohio, United States

The Central Buckeye Conference is an OHSAA athletic league whose members are located in the Ohio counties of Champaign, Clark, Logan, Madison, and Union. The league was established in the fall of 1974.

== Current members ==
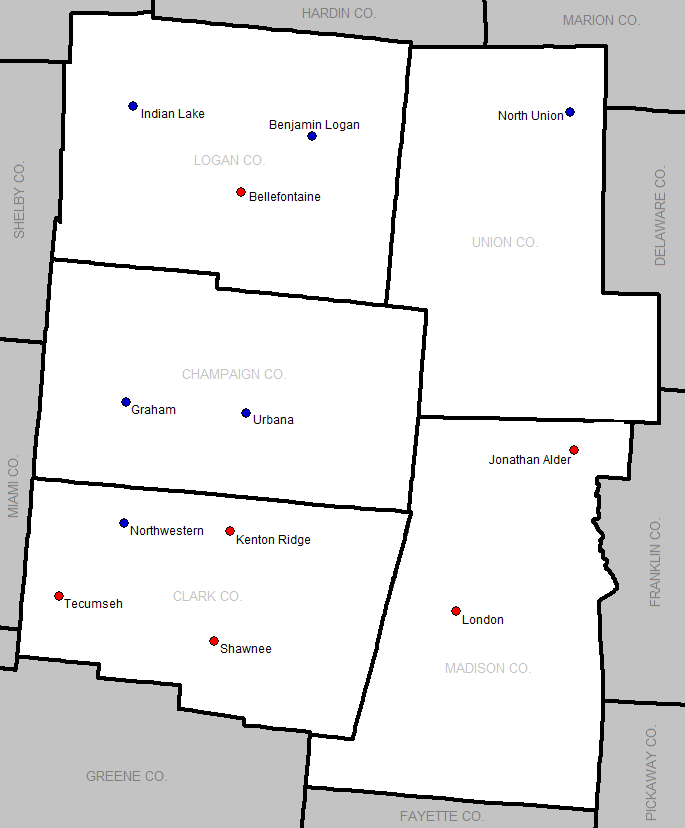
CBC membership as of the 2019-2020 school year. Kenton Trail Division members are in red and Mad River Division members are in blue.

Kenton Trail Division
| School | Nickname | Location | Colors | Joined Conference |
|---|---|---|---|---|
| Bellefontaine | Chieftains | Bellefontaine | | 1974 |
| Jonathan Alder | Pioneers | Plain City | | 2017 |
| Kenton Ridge | Cougars | Springfield | | 1977 |
| London | Red Raiders | London | | 2018 (Football in 2019) |
| Urbana | Hillclimbers | Urbana | | 1974 |
| Tecumseh | Arrows | New Carlisle | | 1991 |

Mad River Division
| School | Nickname | Location | Colors | Joined Conference |
|---|---|---|---|---|
| Benjamin Logan | Raiders | Bellefontaine | | 2001 |
| Graham | Falcons | St. Paris | | 2001 |
| Indian Lake | Lakers | Lewistown | | 2001 |
| North Union | Wildcats | Richwood | | 2018 (Football in 2019) |
| Northwestern | Warriors | Springfield | | 1982 |
| Shawnee | Braves | Springfield | | 1974 |

== Former members ==
| School | Nickname | Location | Colors | Tenure | Left For |
|---|---|---|---|---|---|
| Greenon | Knights | Springfield | | 1974-2017 | OHC |
| Northeastern | Jets | Springfield | | 1974-2001 | OHC |
| Miami East | Vikings | Casstown | | 2001-2006 | CCC |
| Stebbins | Indians | Riverside | | 2007-2016 | GWOC |
| Tippecanoe | Red Devils | Tipp City | | 2001-2016 | GWOC |

== Membership Timeline ==
Kenton Trail Division members are in red, Mad River Division members are in blue, and former members are in green.

== History ==
The CBC was established in time for the 1974-75 school year. The present-day divisions were created to align schools based on size, and every sport recognizes a champion for each division. The charter members of the Central Buckeye Conference were Bellefontaine, Greenon, London, Northeastern, Shawnee, and Urbana.

In 1977, New school Kenton Ridge joined the CBC becoming the 7th member.

In 1978, London left the CBC after 4 years for the now defunct Central Buckeye League bringing the CBC back to 6 members.

Northwestern would join the CBC in 1982 bringing the conference back to 7 members which would eventually grow to 8 when Tecumseh joined in 1991 from the Greater Miami Valley Conference.

The CBC would remain at 8 members until they added 5 new members in Benjamin Logan, Graham, Miami East and Tippecanoe from the Southwestern Rivers Conference, Indian Lake from the Three Rivers Conference, while Northeastern left for the Ohio Heritage Conference bringing the total number of members to 12.

Miami East would leave to join the Cross County Conference in 2006. They would eventually be replaced by Stebbins who joined in 2007.

The CBC would remain at 12 members until 2016 when both Stebbins and Tippecanoe left to join the Greater Western Ohio Conference. Leaving the CBC with 2 divisions of 5 teams each.

In July 2017, both London's and North Union's Board of Educations have approved their membership for the CBC. London will join the Kenton Trail Division with Bellefontaine, Jonathan Alder, Kenton Ridge, Shawnee, and Tecumseh. North Union will join the Mad River Division with Benjamin Logan, Graham, Indian Lake, Northwestern, and Urbana. Date of entry is undetermined. This move brought the CBC back to 12 members allowing for 2, 6 team divisions which allows for easier scheduling.

In March 2025, it was announced that Bethel and Greenon will be joining the conference for the 2027-28 school year. Bethel will be in the Kenton Trail division and Greenon will be in the Mad River division. Bethel will be leaving the Three Rivers Conference, which does not recognize swimming as a conference sport, due to this fact, the Bethel swimteam participated as a conference member startin in the 2025-26 swim season.

== Sponsored Sports ==
The CBC supports 22 league sports for both male and female competition. This includes football, boys and girls basketball, boys and girls track & field, boys and girls cross country, boys and girls soccer, boys and girls golf, boys and girls swimming, boys and girls bowling, boys and girls tennis, baseball, softball, volleyball, wrestling, cheerleading

League champions for each sport are recognized in both the Kenton Trail Division and Mad River Divisions. The CBC also awards an all sports trophy as well.

== Football Championships ==
| Year | Champions | |
|---|---|---|
| Year | Kenton Trail | Mad River |
| 2007 | Tippecanoe | Greenon; Indian Lake; Urbana |
| 2008 | Tecumseh | Urbana |
| 2009 | Tecumseh; Tippecanoe | Graham |
| 2010 | Shawnee | Benjamin Logan; Urbana |
| 2011 | Shawnee | Urbana |
| 2012 | Tecumseh | Urbana |
| 2013 | Tippecanoe | Urbana |
| 2014 | Bellefontaine; Kenton Ridge | Urbana |
| 2015 | Tippecanoe | Indian Lake |
| 2016 | Bellefontaine | Indian Lake |
| 2017 | Bellefontaine | Indian Lake |
| 2018 | Bellefontaine | Indian Lake; Northwestern; Urbana |
| 2019 | Jonathan Alder | North Union |
| 2020 | Jonathan Alder | Graham |
| 2021 | London | Indian Lake; North Union |
| 2022 | Bellefontaine; London | Urbana |

== Swim Meet Championships ==
| Year | BoysSwim Meet Champions | |
|---|---|---|
| Year | **Kenton Trail** | **Mad River** |
| **2009-2010** | **Tippecanoe** | Urbana |
| **2010-2011** | **Tippecanoe** | Urbana |
| **2011-2012** | **Tippecanoe** | Urbana |
| **2012-2013** | **Tippecanoe** | Urbana |
| **2013-2014** | **Kenton Ridge** | Urbana |
| **2014-2015** | **Tippecanoe** | Urbana |
| **2015-2016** | **Tippecanoe** | Urbana |
| **2016-2017** | **Kenton Ridge** | Northwestern |
| **2017-2018** | **Bellefontaine** | Urbana |
| **2018-2019** | **Kenton Ridge** | Benjamin Logan |
| **2019-2020** | **Kenton Ridge** | Benjamin Logan |
| **2020-2021** | **Kenton Ridge** | Benjamin Logan |
| **2021-2022** | **Kenton Ridge** | Indian Lake |
| **2022-2023** | **Bellefontaine** | Benjamin Logan |
| **2023-2024** | **Bellefontaine** | Benjamin Logan |
| **2024-2025** | Bellefontaine | **Benjamin Logan** |
| **2025-2026** | **Bethel** | Benjamin Logan |

Bold denotes overall Champion

| Year | GirlsSwim Meet Champions | |
|---|---|---|
| Year | **Kenton Trail** | **Mad River** |
| **2009-2010** | **Tippecanoe** | Urbana |
| **2010-2011** | **Tippecanoe** | Urbana |
| **2011-2012** | **Tippecanoe** | Urbana |
| **2012-2013** | **Tippecanoe** | Northwestern |
| **2013-2014** | **Tippecanoe** | Urbana |
| **2014-2015** | **Tippecanoe** | Urbana |
| **2015-2016** | **Bellefontaine** | Urbana |
| **2016-2017** | **Bellefontaine** | Benjamin Logan |
| **2017-2018** | **Bellefontaine** | Benjamin Logan |
| **2018-2019** | **Bellefontaine** | Benjamin Logan |
| **2019-2020** | **Bellefontaine** | Benjamin Logan |
| **2020-2021** | **Bellefontaine** | Indian Lake |
| **2021-2022** | **Kenton Ridge** | Northwestern |
| **2022-2023** | **Kenton Ridge** | Northwestern |
| **2023-2024** | **Jonathan Alder** | Benjamin Logan |
| **2024-2025** | **Jonathan Alder** | Benjamin Logan |
| **2025-2026** | Jonathan Alder | **Shawnee** |

Bold denotes overall Champion

== Boys Swimming State Champions ==
| YEAR | SCHOOL | SWIMMER(S) | EVENT |
|---|---|---|---|
| 1994 | Graham | Justin Thornton | 100 Backstroke |
| 1994 | Graham | Justin Thornton | 200 Individual Medley |
| 1995 | Graham | Justin Thornton | 100 Backstroke |
| 1995 | Graham | Justin Thornton | 200 Individual Medley |
| 1996 | Graham | Justin Thornton | 100 Backstroke |
| 1996 | Graham | Justin Thornton | 200 Individual Medley |
| 2016 | Tippecanoe | Elias Jay Bell | 50 Free |
| 2021 | Kenton Ridge | Chase Fyffe, Seth Thomas, Dylan Day, Evan Blazer | 200 Yard Free Relay |
| 2022 | Jonathan Alder | Eli Stoll | 100 yard Backstroke |
| 2023 | Jonathan Alder | Eli Stoll | 100 yard Backstroke |
| 2023 | Kenton Ridge | Evan Blazer | 50 Free |

== All Sports Trophy ==
| Year | Champions | |
|---|---|---|
| Year | Kenton Trail | Mad River |
| 2014-2015 | Kenton Ridge; Tippecanoe | Urbana |
| 2015-2016 | Tippecanoe | Northwestern |
| 2016-2017 | Kenton Ridge | Northwestern |
| 2017-2018 | Jonathan Alder | Northwestern |
| 2018-2019 | Jonathan Alder | Benjamin Logan |
| 2019-2020 | Jonathan Alder | Benjamin Logan |
| 2020-2021 | Jonathan Alder | Benjamin Logan |
| 2021-2022 | Jonathan Alder | Benjamin Logan |
| 2022-2023 | Jonathan Alder | Graham |
| 2023-2024 | Jonathan Alder | Indian Lake |
| 2024-2025 | Jonathan Alder | Benjamin Logan |
| 2025-2026 | Jonathan Alder | Benjamin Logan Indian Lake |
