= John Lewis (Shawnee leader) =

Shawnee leader

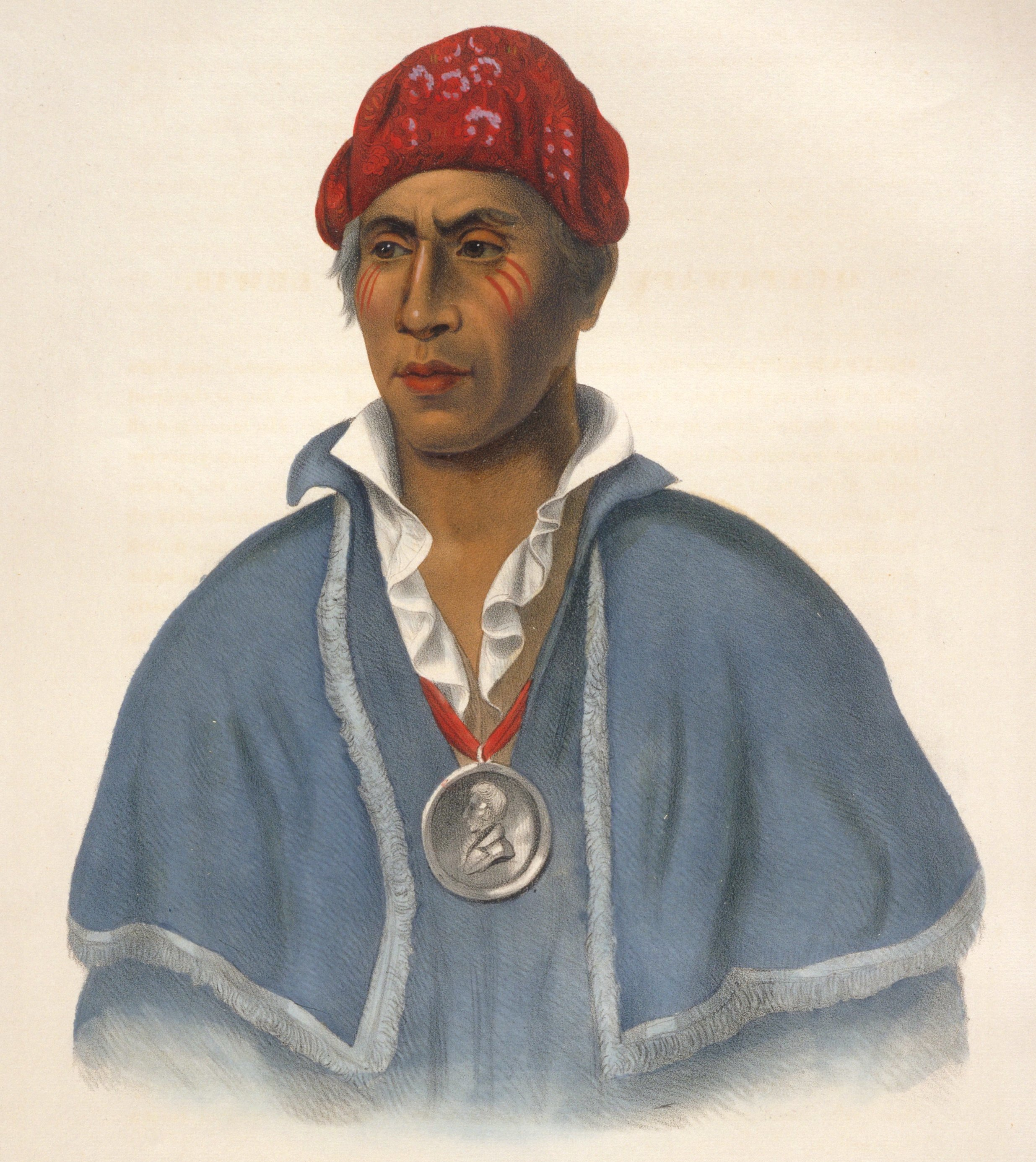
- Born: Quatawapea c. 1760; Pickaway Plains, Ohio Country
- Died: 1826 (aged about 66); Arkansas Territory
- Burial place: Unknown
- Other names: Captain Lewis, Colonel Lewis
- Citizenship: Shawnee
- Occupations: Village chief, diplomat, warrior
- Known for: Leader of the Lewistown Shawnees

Quatawapea or John Lewis (c. 1760 – 1826), also known as Captain Lewis and Colonel Lewis and ‘’’Captain Johnny’’’, was a Shawnee leader for whom Lewistown, Ohio, is named.

== History ==
Lewis fought in the American Revolutionary War (1775–1783) and the Northwest Indian War (1785–1795) as part of Shawnee opposition to the expansion of the United States into Shawnee territory. After the 1795 Treaty of Greenville, he sought to preserve Shawnee autonomy by promoting accommodation with the U.S., working with Black Hoof, the principal Shawnee spokesman.

Lewis served in the War of 1812 as an American ally. After the war, he signed a number of treaties with the U.S., eventually getting Lewistown recognized as an Indian reservation for his band of Shawnees, along with Senecas also living at Lewistown. Lewis made several trips to Washington, D.C. to meet with U.S. officials, including Presidents Thomas Jefferson and James Monroe, to promote Shawnee land rights.

Continued American encroachment on Shawnee lands convinced Lewis to give up on remaining in Ohio. He broke with Black Hoof and advocated Shawnee relocation to the west, promoting a Native confederacy with allied Cherokees in Missouri and the Arkansas Territory. He died before this plan could be realized. After his death, the Shawnees and Senecas of Lewistown, known as the "Mixed Band", were in 1831 compelled to cede their reservation in Ohio and move to Indian Territory. The Lewistown Shawnees eventually became the Eastern Shawnee Tribe of Oklahoma.

== Early life ==
Little is known of Lewis's early life or family background. His year of birth has been estimated as 1760 and 1766. Evidence suggests he was born in the Ohio Country, in one of the Shawnee villages on the Pickaway Plains along the Scioto River, near present-day Circleville, Ohio. In the 1680s, the Shawnees had been driven out of the Ohio Country by the Haudenosaunee. By the mid 1700s, they had begun to reunite in their traditional homeland.

Lewis's Shawnee name was Quatawapea, which was spelled in a variety of ways, including Quitewepea, and has been translated as "the Man Who Swims Below and Above the Water" and "Man on the Water Who Sinks and Rises Again." Shawnees of Lewis's era belonged to one of five tribal divisions: Kispoko, Chalahgawtha (Chillicothe), Mekoche, Pekowi (Piqua), and Hathawekela. Lewis probably belonged to the Piqua division. In addition, each Shawnee belonged to a clan that was named after a totemic animal. Lewis belonged to the Turtle clan.

When Lewis was a child, the Haudenosaunee ceded land south of the Ohio River (including present Kentucky) to the British in the 1768 Treaty of Fort Stanwix. The Shawnees, who used Kentucky as their seasonal hunting ground, had not been consulted in the treaty. They attempted to organize Native resistance to colonial occupation of the region, culminating in the 1774 Battle of Point Pleasant. Lewis fought in the battle as a young man. After losing the battle, the Shawnees were compelled to cede Kentucky to the American colonists. Shawnee resistance to American occupation of Kentucky continued in the American Revolutionary War (1775–1783). Lewis joined Shawnee war parties that raided colonial settlements in Kentucky and Virginia. After the war, the Americans, victorious over the British, claimed the Ohio Country by right of conquest. The Natives of the region continued to resist American encroachment, however, which led to the Northwest Indian War (1785–1795). Lewis fought in that war as well, taking part in St. Clair's defeat (1791) and the Battle of Fallen Timbers (1794), although not in a leading role. The defeat at Fallen Timbers compelled the Shawnees and other Natives to cede much of present-day Ohio to the United States in the 1795 Treaty of Greenville. Lewis likely attended the treaty negotiations, though he did not sign the document.

In the mid-1780s, Lewis married Polly Baker, a white captive who had been adopted into his Shawnee tribe as a child. They had two children. His son was Othowakasica "Yellow Feather". He married a second time to Mary Succopanus, who was of mixed Shawnee-Mingo heritage. They apparently had no children together.

== Lewistown ==
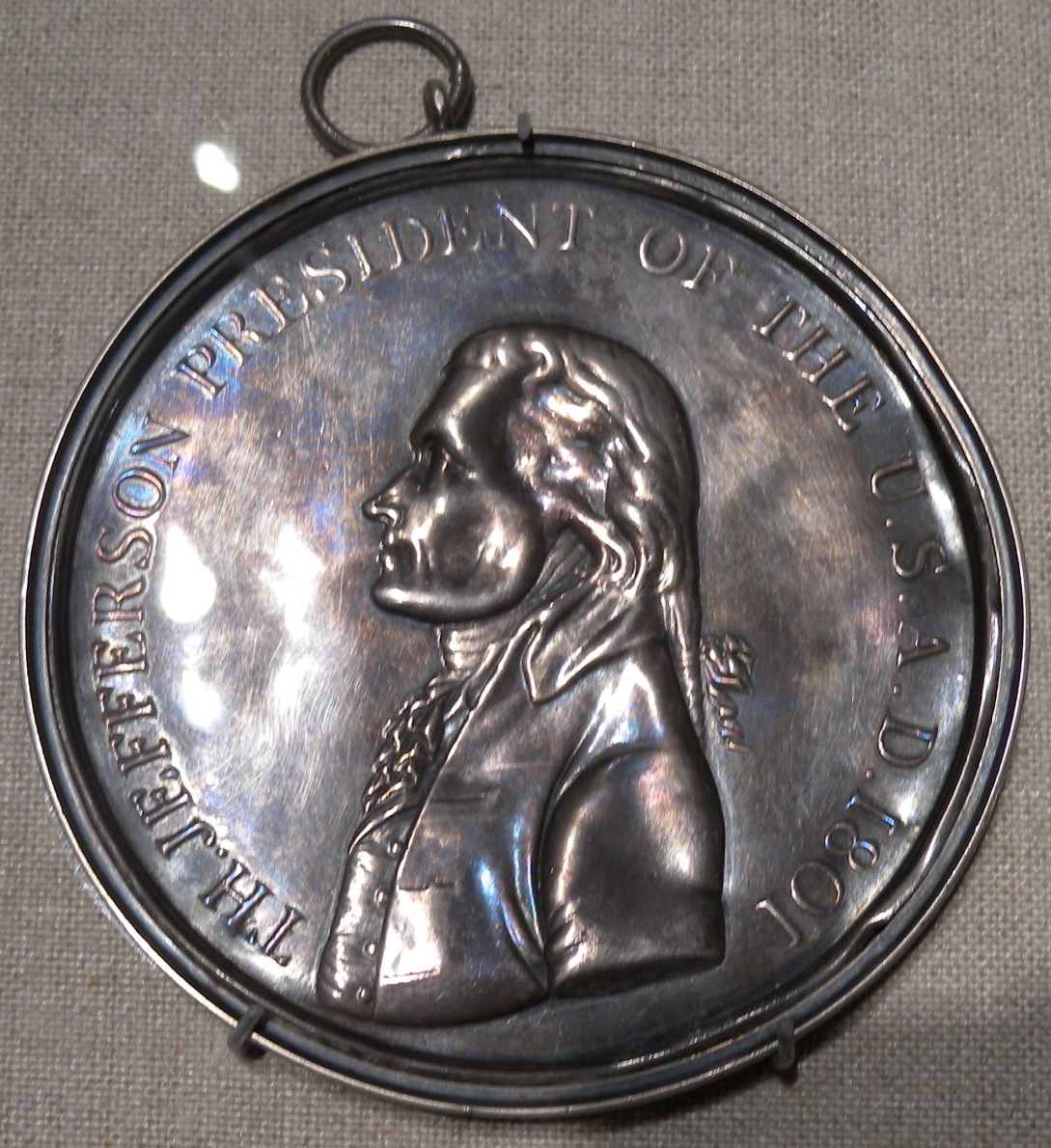
Lewis often wore a "peace medal" like this one, which he received from President Thomas Jefferson in 1802.

After their defeat in the Northwest Indian War, the Shawnees were divided between those who sought accommodation with the United States, those who wished to continue resisting, and those who left the U.S. by moving west of the Mississippi River. Lewis was among those Shawnees who hoped to hold onto their remaining Ohio lands by accommodating the United States. Around 1796, he and his followers established the Shawnee village of Lewistown, in present-day Logan County, Ohio, just north of the Greenville Treaty line. Nearby were two other Shawnee settlements: Hog Creek and Wapakoneta. Wapakoneta was the home of Chief Black Hoof, the principal spokesman of the Ohio Shawnees and foremost advocate of accommodation with the United States.

On February 5, 1802, Lewis was part of a Shawnee and Lenape (Delaware) delegation that met with President Thomas Jefferson and Secretary of War Henry Dearborn in Washington, D.C. Black Hoof spoke for the Shawnees. He complained about white American poachers trespassing on their lands, and asked the government for a deed for their Ohio lands, hoping to secure permanent Shawnee title to their homeland. The U.S. officials promised to punish the poachers, but they refused to issue a deed, saying that the division of lands on the Indian side of the Greenville boundary was outside of their jurisdiction. Lewis received a "peace medal" from Jefferson on this trip, which he would often wear.

Back in Ohio, Lewis and Black Hoof encouraged their fellow Shawnees to adopt some American-style practices to better coexist with their white neighbors. Working with Quaker missionaries, Shawnee men were encouraged to give up hunting and begin farming, which among Shawnees had been considered women's work. In 1808, Black Hoof and Lewis were the only Shawnees to sign the Treaty of Brownstown, which granted the United States a right-of-way to build a road through northwestern Ohio.

Lewis and Black Hoof faced opposition from an emerging Shawnee leader named Tenskwatawa, who became known as the Shawnee Prophet. In 1806, Tenskwatawa and his brother Tecumseh established a new town, Greenville, less than fifty miles from Lewistown. There they attracted hundreds of converts to a movement that rejected the accommodationist program, which represented a challenge to the Shawnee chiefs who sat on the tribal council at Wapakoneta. Most Ohio Shawnees followed Black Hoof's path and rejected the Prophet's leadership. Sugden (1997) wrote that Lewis initially supported the Prophet's movement, but Edmunds (2017) disagreed, saying that Lewis was by 1807 a proponent of Black Hoof's acculturation program.

In 1808, Tenskwatawa and Tecumseh moved to a new town, Prophetstown, north of present-day Lafayette, Indiana. As the Americans continued to acquire additional Native land in a series of treaties, tensions arose between Prophetstown and the governor of the Indiana Territory, William Henry Harrison. In 1811, Harrison assembled an army to march on Prophetstown, hoping to disperse the settlement and bring an end to the Prophet's movement. Black Hoof and Lewis assured American officials they would remain at peace during the conflict.

== War of 1812 ==
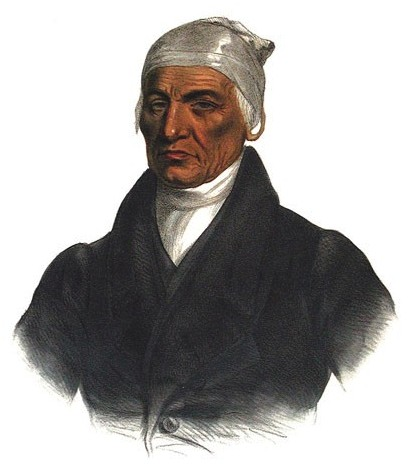
Black Hoof (Catecahassa) was the principal spokesman for the Ohio Shawnees. Lewis followed his lead until the 1820s.

After Harrison destroyed Prophetstown, Tenskwatawa and Tecumseh joined forces with the British in Upper Canada at the outset of the War of 1812. Lewis and other Shawnee leaders agreed to act as scouts and interpreters for the American army under General William Hull that was marching through Ohio to protect Detroit. Lewis took no part in the early skirmishing around Detroit; instead, he and Black Hoof encouraged other Natives to remain neutral in the conflict. This proved to be difficult after Tecumseh helped the British capture Detroit and Hull's entire army. Many Natives decided to side with the British, who seemed to have the upper hand in this early stage of the war.

The tide began to turn in September 1812 when a new American army under William Henry Harrison began a campaign to recapture Detroit. Lewis and several other Shawnees, including Captain Logan, served as scouts for Harrison's army. American soldiers made little distinction between hostile and friendly Natives, however. On January 25, 1813, while Lewis and Black Hoof were meeting with Ohio militia General Edward Tupper, an unknown American militiaman shot Black Hoof in the face. Black Hoof survived the assassination attempt; the assailant was never caught.

While Black Hoof recovered, Lewis continued to scout for the Americans. In April, he was in Fort Meigs with Harrison when Tecumseh and a British force under General Henry Procter unsuccessfully laid siege to the fort. Although Lewis and other Natives served with the Americans in the war, many whites continued to distrust them. To demonstrate their loyalty, Captain Lewis joined more than 200 Shawnee and Delaware warriors for Harrison's invasion of Upper Canada, serving as scouts and skirmishers. Lewis and his men were present at the Battle of the Thames on October 5, 1813, in which Tecumseh was killed. Lewis's men were still encircling the British position when the Americans charged, and so the battle was over before Lewis and his warriors were engaged. Although Tecumseh is popularly associated with Shawnee resistance to the United States, more Shawnees served in Harrison's army at the Battle of the Thames than alongside Tecumseh.

Lewis returned to Lewistown after the battle, only to find that a mob of Americans had attacked his village, burning some cabins and destroying the cornfields. Indian agent John Johnston restored peace and provided the Shawnees with food to get through the winter. In the 1814 Treaty of Greenville, the Americans sought to gain the loyalty of Natives who had been fighting for the British. Lewis signed the treaty, although he doubted the sincerity of some of the other signatories.

In October 1814, Lewis and 65 Shawnees joined Colonel Duncan McArthur's invasion of Upper Canada, fighting at the Battle of Malcolm's Mills on November 6. The Shawnees suffered no casualties in the battle. At the end of the war, Lewis, Black Hoof, and other Shawnees signed the Treaty of Spring Wells on September 8, 1815, which confirmed that the Shawnees still owned the land guaranteed to them in the 1795 Treaty of Greenville.

== Reservation ==
The American population in Ohio continued to rise after the War of 1812, increasing pressure on the Shawnees to cede their territory and move west of the Mississippi. Lewis and Black Hoof resisted these pressures, and worked to secure a definitive title to their lands. In the 1817 Treaty of Fort Meigs, they and leaders from other tribes ceded northwestern Ohio to the United States in exchange for carefully delineated reservations. The treaty created three small Shawnee reservations in Ohio: Wapakoneta, Lewistown, and Hog Creek, encompassing about 170 square miles (440 km^{2}). The Lewistown reservation was 48 square miles (120 km^{2}), divided between Shawnees and Senecas who lived at Lewistown. The treaty authorized the Lewistown chiefs to divide the reservation into lots assigned to individual families. According to Lakomäki (2014), "The United States had finally recognized exclusive Shawnee ownership of clearly bounded territories. Now no other nation would be able to sell the land under Shawnee feet."

The Treaty of Fort Meigs met with opposition in the United States Senate. Senators disliked the notion of Natives holding land in fee simple, and so they instructed U.S. officials to renegotiate the treaty. A supplemental agreement, the 1818 Treaty of St. Mary's, was created with language that made clear the U.S. government still ultimately controlled the land, and if Shawnees sold the land, they could only sell it to the U.S. government. Lewis signed the second treaty, although he was likely discouraged by the change. Indian agent John Johnston reported that there were 800 Shawnees living in Ohio in 1819: 559 at Wapakoneta, 169 at Lewistown, and 72 at Hog Creek.

Although the Ohio Shawnees now had reservations, white settlers continued to poach on their lands. In 1820, Lewis and Black Hoof made another trip to Washington, D.C., where they met with Secretary of War John C. Calhoun. The Shawnees wanted to secure patents in fee simple to their lands, but their request was denied. Officials in Washington now favored a policy of Indian removal, which encouraged Natives to cede their lands to the government and resettle west of the Mississippi.

== Removal ==
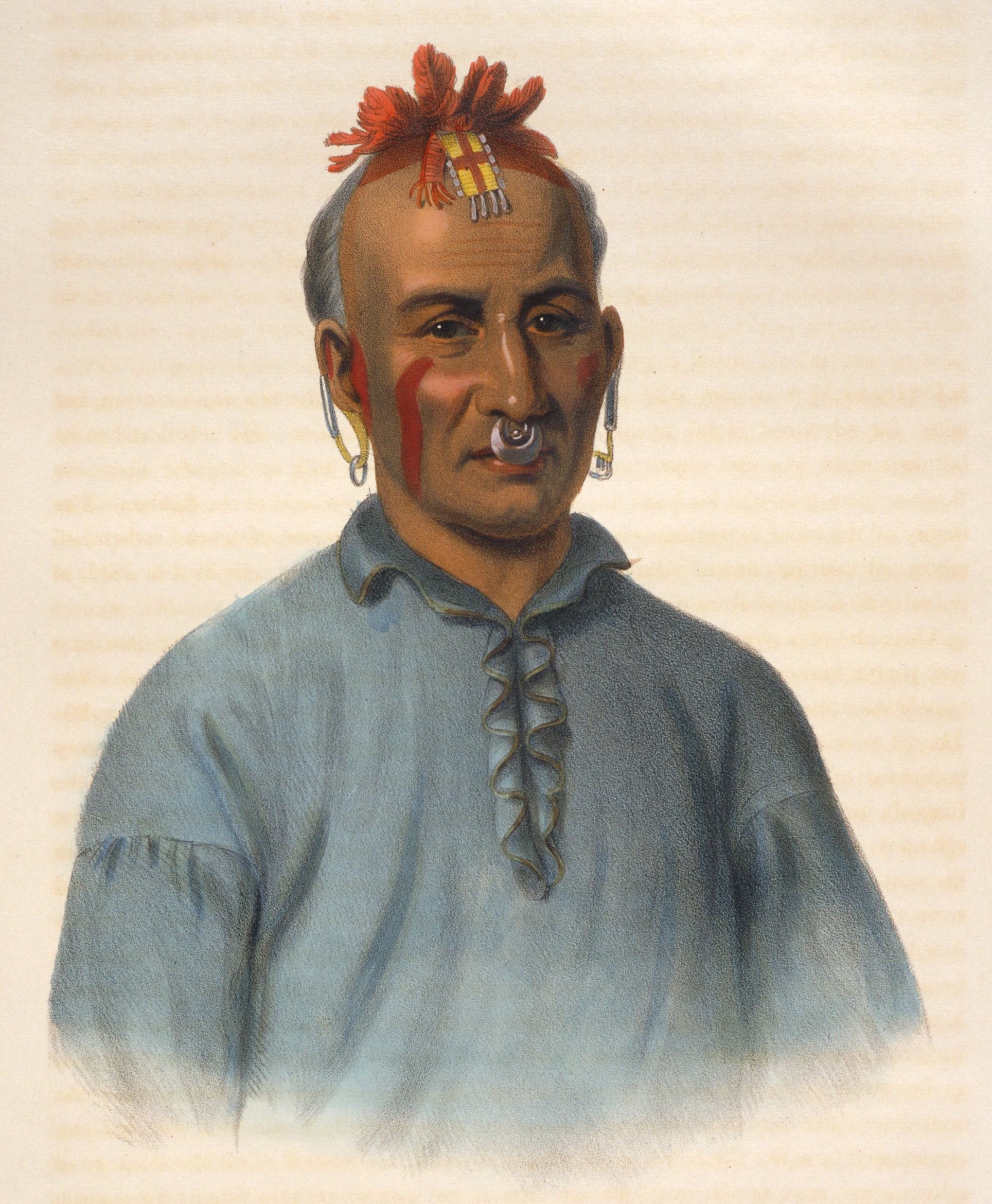
Kiscallawa, a chief from the Missouri Shawnees, joined Lewis on the 1825 trip to Washington, D.C.

After the failed 1820 trip to Washington, Lewis seemed to have concluded that remaining in Ohio was no longer feasible. In 1822, he took his family and a small band of followers from Lewistown to the Arkansas Territory, establishing a village on Lovely's Purchase near present-day Yellville, Arkansas. There Lewis supported Cherokee Chief Takatoka's plan to create a Native confederacy of tribes in Arkansas and southern Missouri. The confederacy would defend against white trespassers as well as Osages, who were in frequent conflict with the Native immigrants. Lewis soon became a leading figure of the proposed confederacy. In August 1823, he traveled back to Ohio to invite the Shawnees to join. On the way he met with Indian agent William Clark and told him about the plan. Clark endorsed the idea and wrote Secretary Calhoun, urging him to support it as well.

Back in Ohio, some Shawnees supported Lewis's proposal to relocate, but Black Hoof was steadfastly opposed. In October 1823, Lewis traveled to Kaskaskia, Illinois, to meet with a Cherokee delegation headed by Takatoka. Takatoka became ill and died at Kaskaskia, depriving Lewis of his most influential ally in creating the confederacy. Lewis returned to Wapakoneta with Indian agent Pierre Menard to make another attempt at convincing Black Hoof to emigrate to the west, which was again unsuccessful. In February 1825, Lewis made another trip to Washington, D.C., where he met with Calhoun and President James Monroe. Monroe disapproved of Lewis's plan, because American politicians from Missouri and Arkansas opposed settling more Natives there. Instead, U.S. officials proposed creating a Native reservation even further west. Lewis supported the idea, but Black Hoof and John Johnston worked against the plan. Johnston spread rumors that Lewis was only attempting to enrich himself, telling American officials that Lewis was no longer a chief.

A council was held at Wapakoneta in May 1825, where Lewis tried to convince Shawnees to emigrate to the west. In attendance was Lewis Cass, governor of the Michigan Territory, who had brought Tenskwatawa, Lewis's old opponent, to help promote the removal plan. Black Hoof still opposed removal, and he criticized Lewis for promoting the idea without the support of the Wapakoneta council. In the autumn of 1825, Lewis left Lewistown with 255 Shawnees and a few Senecas to settle in the west. In November he met with William Clark at St. Louis, and told him that he and his followers would no longer return to Ohio. Lewis disappeared from the historical record after this time, and appears to have died of natural causes in Arkansas in 1826.

== Legacy ==
After the passage of the Indian Removal Act in 1830, American officials increased pressure on Natives still living in Ohio to sign treaties and move to the West. In the 1831 Treaty of Lewistown, the Shawnees and Senecas of Lewistown, known as the "Mixed Band", were compelled to cede their reservation in Ohio and move to Indian Territory. In a treaty with the United States finalized in 1868, the Mixed Band of Senecas and Shawnees separated into two groups, the Shawnees becoming the Eastern Shawnee Tribe of Oklahoma.

== Treaties signed ==
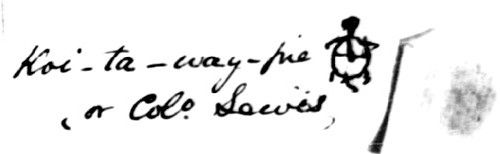
Lewis drew his mark (representing the Turtle clan) next to his name on the 1808 Treaty of Brownstown.

- Treaty of Brownstown (1808) as "Koitawaypie, or Col. Lewis"
- Treaty of Greenville (1814) as "Quitawepeh, or captain Lewis"
- Treaty of Spring Wells (1815) as "Quatawwepay, or capt. Lewis"
- Treaty of Fort Meigs (1817) as "Quitawepea, or Captain Lewis"
- Treaty of St. Mary's (1818) as "Quitawepa, or Colonel Lewis"
