= Kidding Around =

Kidding Around may refer to:

- Kidding Around, 1985 album by Greg & Steve
- Kidding Around, 1997 album by Arnett Howard
- Kidding Around, 1999 album by Alex Beaton
- Kidding Around, 2002 book by Margaret Clark (Australian writer)
- "Kidding Around", track from 2015 album B'lieve I'm Goin Down...
- "Kidding Around", segment in Canadian TV program Ants in Your Pants
- Kidding Around, a toy store in Chelsea, Manhattan, New York City.
