= Ray DeCola =

American football player and coach (1930–2017)

Biographical details
- Born: September 17, 1930; Shadyside, Ohio, U.S.
- Died: April 3, 2017 (aged 86); Columbus, Ohio, U.S.

Playing career
- 1950–1953: West Liberty

Coaching career (HC unless noted)
- 1971–1984: Urbana HS (OH)
- 1985–1987: Urbana

Head coaching record
- Overall: 177–54–6 (high school); 9–9–1 (college)

Accomplishments and honors

Awards
- AP Ohio AA Coach of the Year (1992); West Liberty Hall of Fame (1985)

Ramon Edward "Ray" DeCola (September 17, 1930 – April 3, 2017) was an American football coach. A 1953 graduate of West Liberty University in West Liberty, West Virginia, he began his career as a high school coach at various stops including New Albany, St. Mary's, Johnstown, and Urbana in Ohio where he accumulated a record of 177–54–6 over 24 seasons.

From 1985 to 1987, he was the head coach of the resurrected football program at Urbana University in Urbana, Ohio where compiled a 9–9–1.

== Head coaching record ==
=== College ===
Year	Team	Overall	Conference	Standing	Bowl/playoffs
Urbana Blue Knights (Mid-Ohio Conference) (1985–1987)
1985	Urbana	2–0			
1986	Urbana	4–4–1			
1987	Urbana	3–5			
Urbana:		9–9–1			
Total:		9–9–1			
