= Hog Creek =

Hog Creek may refer to:

- Hog Creek (Crooked Creek tributary), a stream in Missouri
- Hog Creek (Ottawa River tributary), a stream in Ohio
