= Robert Hatcher =

Robert Hatcher may refer to:

- Robert D. Hatcher (born 1940), American structural geologist
- Robert A. Hatcher (1819–1886), American politician from Missouri
