= London High School (Ohio) =

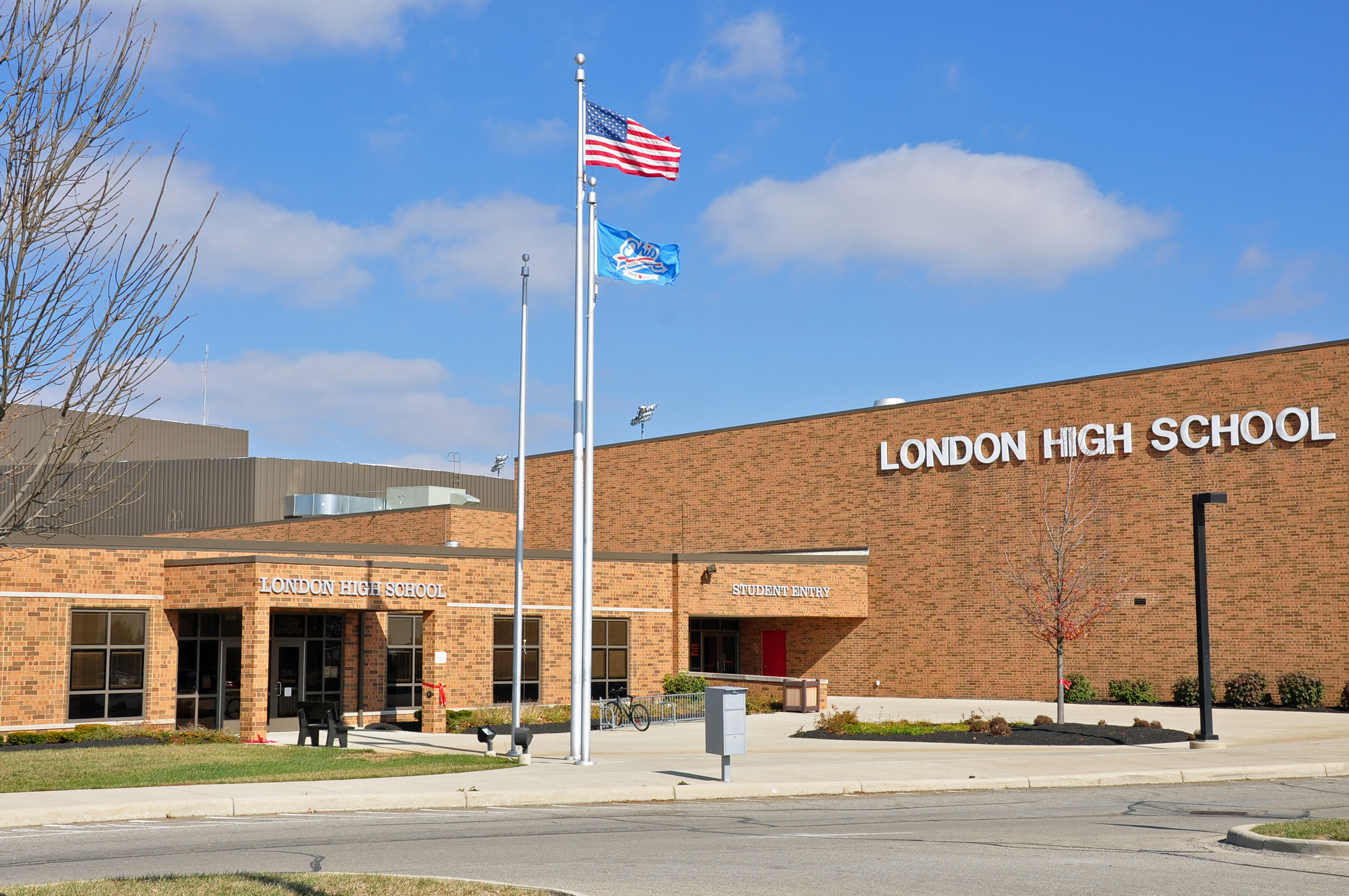
- London High School - London, Ohio

Location
- 336 Elm Street; London, Ohio 43140; United States
- Coordinates: 39°54′19″N 83°26′55″W

Information
- Type: Public, coeducational
- Motto: Love, Learn, Lead
- School district: London City School District
- CEEB code: 363025
- NCES School ID: 390442501182
- Principal: Ryan Rismiller
- Grades: 9–12
- Enrollment: 650 (2023–24)
- Colors: Red and white
- Athletics conference: Central Buckeye Conference (Ohio Division)
- Team name: Red Raiders
- Accreditation: Ohio Department of Education
- Website: london.k12.oh.us/o/lhs

London High School (LHS) is a public high school in London, Ohio, United States. It is the only high school in the London City School District. The school's athletic teams are known as the Red Raiders with school colors of red and white. LHS competes in the Ohio High School Athletic Association (OHSAA) as a member of the Central Buckeye Conference.

== Notable alumni ==
- David "Satch" Davidson, professional umpire in Major League Baseball
- Isaiah Jones, college football linebacker for the Indiana Hoosiers
- Dick LeBeau, professional football player and coach in the National Football League (NFL) and member of the Pro Football Hall of Fame
- Al Mancini, American and UK stage, television and film actor
- Chick McGee, radio personality
