= Indian Lake High School =

- Indicum Lacus Alta Schola

Location
- 6210 State Route 235 North; Lewistown, (Logan County), Ohio 43333; United States
- Coordinates: 40°26′14″N 83°54′18″W

Information
- Type: Public, Coeducational high school
- Opened: 1968
- School district: Indian Lake Local School District
- Superintendent: R. Underwood
- Principal: Kyle Wagner
- Grades: 9-12
- Colors: Red, white and black
- Athletics conference: Central Buckeye Conference
- Team name: Lakers
- Rival: Bellefontaine Local Schools
- Accreditation: North Central Association of Colleges and Schools
- Athletic Director: Jeff Courter
- Website: hs.ils-k12.org

Indian Lake High School is a public high school in Washington Township, Logan County, Ohio, United States, near the village of Lewistown. It is the only high school in the Indian Lake Local School District.
