= Henry Hanford =

American farmer and settler (1784–1866)

Henry Hanford (1784–1866) was a farmer and the first Euro-American settler of Lewistown, Ohio, United States.

Hanford was born in Norwalk, Connecticut. He migrated with his brother Thaddeus, who had preceded him to the then new country, to Hamilton County, Ohio in 1806. He settled at Columbia Township, on the Ohio River, and was engaged in running a provision boat from Columbia to Natchez. In 1810 Henry Hanford married Harriet Chamberlin, a native of New York. Two years later the young family moved to Champaign County, now Clark County.

In January 1834 Henry Hanford purchased 250 acres (1.0 km^{2}) of public land (according to the provisions of the Land Act of 1820) in Logan County, Ohio, utilizing the land office at Piqua. Later he acquired more land, using the Wapakoneta land office, until he owned 825 acres (3.34 km^{2}) in Logan County. He opened a general store and became the first postmaster of Lewistown.

Henry and Harriet Hanford had "seven children, all of whom grew to years of maturity". Henry Hanford died on December 31, 1866, and was buried at Lewistown Cemetery, Ohio.
