= Benjamin Logan High School =

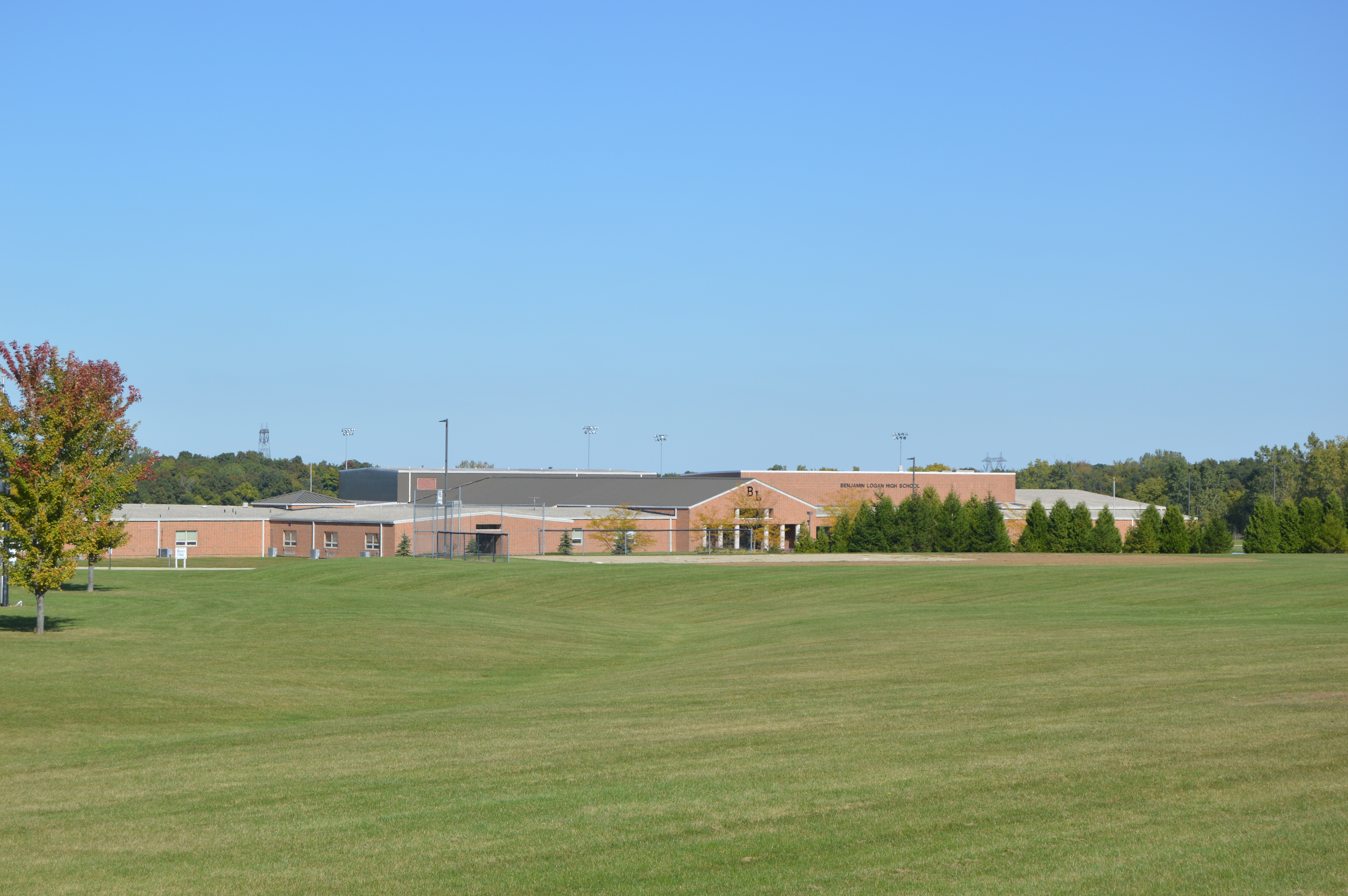
- Overview from the southwest

Location
- 6609 State Route 47 East; Bellefontaine, (Logan County), Ohio 43311; United States
- Coordinates: 40°24′31″N 83°39′18″W

Information
- Type: Public, Coeducational high school
- Opened: 1970
- School district: Benjamin Logan Local School District
- Superintendent: John Scheu
- Principal: Annette Ramga-Alatorre
- Teaching staff: 32.00 (on an FTE basis)
- Grades: 9-12
- Enrollment: 522 (2023–2024)
- Student to teacher ratio: 16.31
- Colors: Black, Gold, and White
- Athletics conference: Central Buckeye Conference
- Team name: Raiders
- Website: https://hs.benjaminlogan.org/

Benjamin Logan High School is a public high school in Logan County, Ohio. It is the only high school in the Benjamin Logan Local Schools district.

== Background ==
Benjamin Logan High School is a secondary school located at 55° 45′ 0″ N 37° 37′ 0″ E. The first high school building was the former Zanesfield building and in 1990 it was moved to its current location.

Teachers from Ben Logan host Japanese teachers as a cultural exchange.

=== Athletics ===
The school offers 13 varsity sports. It holds Ohio state records for:

- Football: longest run (99 yards, Scott Rose)
- Wrestling: third fastest pin (0:05, Cole Carpenter 275 lb (125 kg))
- Baseball: second most home runs in a game (Eric Stucke, 4); second most hits-by-pitches in a game (Landon Small, 3), and fifth for hits-by-pitches in a season (Landon Small, 13)
- Volleyball: fourth kill in a match (Nicole Fawcett, 38) and second kills in a season (Nicole Fawcett, 539)

Benjamin Logan also sponsors soccer, track and field, cross country, golf, bowling, and basketball teams.

Benjamin Logan won its first Ohio High School Athletic Association team state championship in 2025 at the Bowling state tournament.
