= Jonathan Alder High School =

High school in Canaan Township, Ohio, US

Location
- 9200 U.S. Route 42 S Plain City, (Madison County), Ohio 43064; United States; 40°4′41″N 83°17′16″W

Information
- Type: Public, Coeducational high school
- Motto: Value the Past. Invest in Today. Elevate the Future.
- Opened: 1957
- School district: Jonathan Alder Local Schools
- Superintendent: Gary Chapman
- CEEB code: 364205
- Principal: Clint Hayes
- Teaching staff: 34.57 (FTE)
- Grades: 9-12
- Student to teacher ratio: 19.41
- Campus type: Rural
- Colors: Black and Scarlet
- Athletics conference: Central Buckeye Conference
- Team name: Pioneers
- Accreditation: North Central Association of Colleges and Schools
- Newspaper: The Pioneer Press
- Yearbook: The Powderhorn
- Website: www.alder.k12.oh.us/o/jahs

Jonathan Alder High School is an NCA accredited public high school located in Canaan Township, Ohio, with a Plain City address. It is the only high school in the Jonathan Alder Local School District. The school, as well as the district, are named after Jonathan Alder, the first white settler in Madison County.

Within Madison County the district includes that county's section of Plain City and Plumwood. In Union County the district includes the rest of Plain City and most of the New California census-designated place. In Franklin County the district includes a portion of Dublin.

The current building was first occupied in the 2005–2006 school year. The original Jonathan Alder High School was built at 6440 Kilbury-Huber Rd., and was turned into a Junior High School when the new building was built.

== Athletics ==
- Baseball - 1998 State Champions, 2010 State Champions (Undefeated 34-0 Season), 2013 State Runner-up, 2014 State Runner-up
- Girls Basketball – 2006 State Champions
- Football - 2006 State Runner-up
- Bowling - 2018 DII Boys State Runner up, 2019 DII Boys State Runner up
- Softball - 2019 DII Girls State Champions, 2022 DII State Runner-Up
- Volleyball - 2015 State Runner-up

== Notable alumni ==
- Arnett Howard, trumpet Player
- Donnie Nickey, NFL player
