= Magnetic Springs, Ohio =

- Village
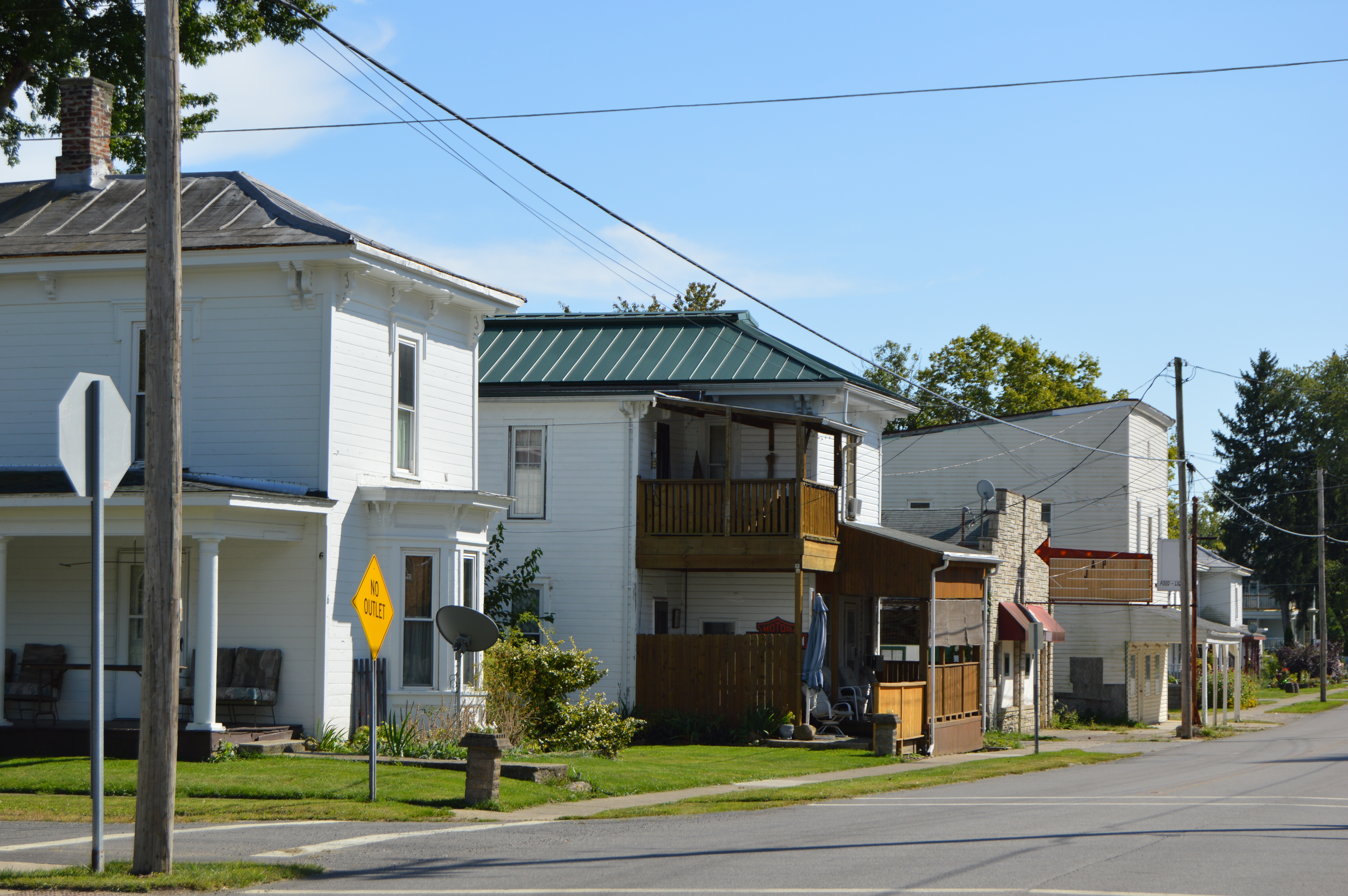
- Main Street (Ohio State Route 37) in Magnetic Springs

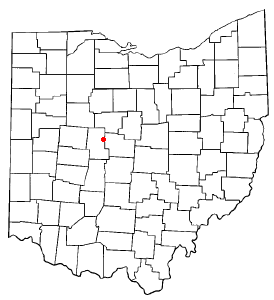
- Location of Magnetic Springs, Ohio

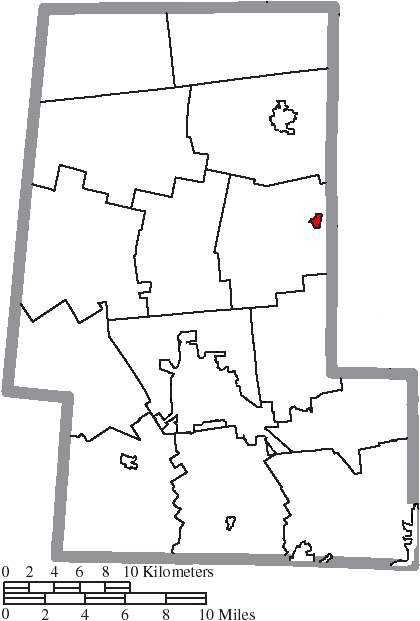
- Location of Magnetic Springs in Union County
- Coordinates: 40°21′13″N 83°15′45″W
- Country: United States
- State: Ohio
- County: Union
- Township: Leesburg

Government
  - Type: Mayor-Council
  - Mayor: Chad Wilson

Area
  - Total: 0.22 sq mi (0.58 km^{2})
  - Land: 0.21 sq mi (0.55 km^{2})
  - Water: 0.0077 sq mi (0.02 km^{2})
- Elevation: 935 ft (285 m)

Population (2020)
  - Total: 267
  - Density: 1,253.2/sq mi (483.86/km^{2})
- Time zone: UTC-5 (Eastern (EST))
  - Summer (DST): UTC-4 (EDT)
- ZIP code: 43036
- Area codes: 937 and 326
- FIPS code: 39-46830
- GNIS feature ID: 2399223
- Website: magneticspringsoh.gov

Magnetic Springs is a village in Leesburg Township, Union County, Ohio, United States. The population was 267 at the 2020 census. The village has a post office with the ZIP Code of 43036.

== History ==
Magnetic Springs was platted in 1879 when underground springs were discovered there. The community earned its name from the mineral waters used for healing processes. Word spread across the country of these springs, and tourists began visiting from locations nationwide; even foreigners appeared occasionally. Hotel resorts sprang up, and the village boomed. Following the discovery of modern medicinal cures, including the vaccine for polio, the interest in natural healing remedies faded, and the city's tourism industry collapsed. By the early 1980s, the hotel resorts had been torn down.

During the Prohibition era of the 1920s, the village was a local hotbed of bootlegging and gambling, although it faced vigorous opposition from the mayor, Mary McFadden. She also led bond raising campaigns for public services and a larger town hall, and to encourage full council meetings she cooked dinner for all the members.

== Geography ==
According to the United States Census Bureau, the village has a total area of 0.24 square miles (0.62 km^{2}), of which 0.23 square miles (0.60 km^{2}) is land and 0.01 square miles (0.03 km^{2}) is water.

== Demographics ==
Historical population
Census	Pop.	Note	%±
1890	257		—
1900	194		−24.5%
1910	155		−20.1%
1920	194		25.2%
1930	178		−8.2%
1940	246		38.2%
1950	321		30.5%
1960	344		7.2%
1970	349		1.5%
1980	314		−10.0%
1990	373		18.8%
2000	323		−13.4%
2010	268		−17.0%
2020	267		−0.4%
U.S. Decennial Census

=== 2010 census ===
As of the census of 2010, there were 268 people, 110 households, and 75 families living in the village. The population density was 1,165.2 inhabitants per square mile (449.9/km^{2}). There were 127 housing units at an average density of 552.2 per square mile (213.2/km^{2}). The racial makeup of the village was 97.4% White, 0.4% African American, 0.7% Native American, and 1.5% from two or more races.

There were 110 households, of which 35.5% had children under the age of 18 living with them, 42.7% were married couples living together, 18.2% had a female householder with no husband present, 7.3% had a male householder with no wife present, and 31.8% were non-families. 26.4% of all households were made up of individuals, and 7.2% had someone living alone who was 65 years of age or older. The average household size was 2.44 and the average family size was 2.84.

The median age in the village was 39.8 years. 25.4% of residents were under the age of 18; 9.8% were between the ages of 18 and 24; 22.4% were from 25 to 44; 35% were from 45 to 64; and 7.5% were 65 years of age or older. The gender makeup of the village was 51.9% male and 48.1% female.

=== 2000 census ===
As of the census of 2000, there were 323 people, 120 households, and 80 families living in the village. The population density was 1,325.0 inhabitants per square mile (511.6/km^{2}). There were 126 housing units at an average density of 516.9 per square mile (199.6/km^{2}). The racial makeup of the village was 97.52% White, 0.62% Asian, 1.24% from other races, and 0.62% from two or more races.

There were 120 households, out of which 36.7% had children under the age of 18 living with them, 50.8% were married couples living together, 9.2% had a female householder with no husband present, and 33.3% were non-families. 28.3% of all households were made up of individuals, and 8.3% had someone living alone who was 65 years of age or older. The average household size was 2.69 and the average family size was 3.30.

In the village, the population was spread out, with 29.4% under the age of 18, 12.4% from 18 to 24, 30.7% from 25 to 44, 19.2% from 45 to 64, and 8.4% who were 65 years of age or older. The median age was 32 years. For every 100 females there were 100.6 males. For every 100 females age 18 and over, there were 107.3 males.

The median income for a household in the village was $40,208, and the median income for a family was $38,750. Males had a median income of $35,000 versus $22,500 for females. The per capita income for the village was $14,821. About 7.0% of families and 6.0% of the population were below the poverty line, including 5.6% of those under age 18 and none of those age 65 or over.

== Economy ==
The Magnetic Springs Water Company was originally founded in Magnetic Springs, but has since relocated to Columbus.

== Education ==
It is in the North Union Local School District. The comprehensive high school is North Union High School.
