= Graham Local School District =

School district in Ohio

Location
- St. Paris, Ohio United States

District information
- Type: Public School District
- Motto: Triumph With Honor
- Established: 1957
- President: Leslie Maurice
- Vice-president: Steve Setty
- Superintendent: Chad Lensman
- Asst. superintendent(s): Emily Smith

Students and staff
- Students: 2,300 (2007-2008)
- Faculty: 123
- Staff: 7
- District mascot: Falcon
- Colors: Black and White

Other information
- Website: www.grahamlocalschools.org

Graham Local School District is a rural district in Champaign County, Ohio. The district serves the St. Paris area, and several other small communities including: Rosewood, Christiansburg, Terre Haute, Carysville, Millerstown, Westville and Thackery and covers a little section of southeastern Shelby county eastern Miami county and far north western Clark county southwestern Logan county and Northwestern portions of the city of Urbana. The district is named after local legend A.B. Graham, the founder of the 4-H agriculture program.

Currently, Graham LSD is one of the largest school districts in Ohio in terms of area covered. The district covers over 185 square miles (480 km^{2}), which is nearly the size the Columbus, Ohio. Despite this, the number of students is relatively small, which is estimated to be about 2300 district-wide.

== History ==
Before the Graham Local School District existed, there were six independent schools in the western Champaign county area: Concord, Christiansburg-Jackson, Rosewood, St. Paris, Terre Haute and Westville. Each school consisted of a one building school which housed all grades for their respected population.

In 1957, these 6 buildings were consolidated to form one district, Graham. Concord School became Graham East Elementary. Christiansburg-Jackson School and Rosewood School became Graham South Elementary and Graham North Elementary, respectively. The St. Paris School became Graham Junior High School, and Graham High School was built on U.S. Route 36, near Kite Road.

Its unclear what Westville and Terre Haute schools were used for initially after the merger.

In 2000, a new building, Graham Middle School, was constructed just east of St. Paris on 36. The old Graham Junior High School building was repurposed and used for the Board of Education, administrative offices, and Graham Digital Academy/A. B. Graham Academy. After the academy closed in 2014, the village of St. Paris obtained the building. They chose to demolish it in 2020.

In 2007, yet another building, Graham Elementary, was built right next to the Middle School. Graham Elementary replaced the venerable elementary schools of Graham North, Graham East and Graham South. Both North and South buildings have been demolished after nearly 100 years of service. Currently, the Concord school (Graham East) building is used as a community center.

In 2009, Graham High School underwent a $13 million renovation, including a new kitchen area, air conditioning, and a new gymnasium.

== Current facilities ==
- Graham High School
- Graham Middle School
- Graham Elementary School

== The Graham Community Foundation ==
In 2000, several graduates representing Graham's six founding schools created The Graham Community Foundation, which is designed to raise funds for scholarships and grants for Graham students. To date, the Foundation has raised $75,000 for this purpose. The funds are administrated by the Troy Foundation in Troy Ohio. Only the interest earned is used for the awards. Since starting the Foundation, fourteen scholarships and grants have been awarded.
