= Clark-Shawnee Local School District =

School district in Ohio, United States

Clark-Shawnee Local School District is a school district in Clark County, Ohio.

The district covers Springfield Township, small parts of Bethel and Harmony townships, and small segments of the City of Springfield.

== History ==
Gregg Morris, previously the superintendent, was scheduled to retire in 2018. Brian Kuhn, then the assistant superintendent, was to take over.

In 2020, the middle and high school building was being renovated while a new consolidated elementary school was being built. The SHP company was responsible for the architectural work.

== Schools ==
- Shawnee Elementary School (PreK-Grade 6)
  - Formed in 2021 as a consolidation of the elementary school components of the three K-8 schools that were consolidated in 2021.
- Shawnee Middle School (Grades 7-8)
  - Formed in 2017 as a consolidation of the middle school components of the three K-8 schools that were consolidated in 2021. It moved into the building with the high school.
- Shawnee High School (Grades 9-12)
  - Opened in 1958.

Former schools (K-8 until 2017, elementary only after 2017, all merged in 2021):

- Possum Elementary/Middle School
- Reid Elementary/Middle School
- Rockaway Elementary/Middle School
