= Jonathan Alder =

American settler (1773–1849)

- Born: September 17, 1773; Gloucester, New Jersey
- Died: January 30, 1849 (aged 75); Canaan Township, Madison County, Ohio
- Occupation: Farmer
- Known for: Captivity among Shawnee; First settling Madison County, Ohio
- Spouses: Barshaw; Mary Ann Blont

Jonathan Alder (September 17, 1773 – January 30, 1849) was an American pioneer, and the first Euro-American settler in Madison County, Ohio. As a young child living in Virginia, Alder was kidnapped by Shawnee, and later adopted by a Mingo chief in the Ohio Country. He lived with the Native Americans for many years before returning to the white community.

Alder settled near present-day Plain City, Ohio, where he became a farmer. He was reunited with his birth family, which moved to Ohio with him, and also had a short career as a military officer during the War of 1812. A middle school, high school, and school district in Plain City all bear his name.

== Early life ==
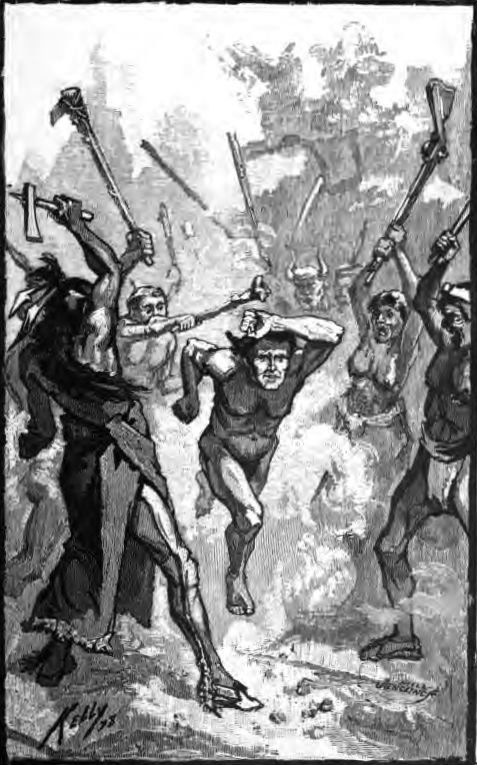
Example of running the gauntlet

Alder was born September 17, 1773, in Gloucester, New Jersey, to Bartholomew Alder and Hannah Worthington. The family moved in 1775 to Wythe County, Virginia, where Alder's father died about a year later. In May 1782, Jonathan, at eight years old, was sent out with his brother David to search for a couple of horses that ran away. They were attacked by a small group of Shawnee Indians from Ohio. David saw the Indians first and tried to escape, but he was chased down, killed, and later scalped. The Indian group also captured Alder's neighbor, Mrs. Martin, and her young child.

The group travelled north, passing present-day Chillicothe, Ohio, on the way to a Mingo village on the north side of the Mad River, somewhere near present-day Logan County, Ohio. During the trip, the Indians killed and scalped Martin's child, whom they found burdensome. Martin responded by screaming in grief; when the Indians' threats to scalp her did not quiet her screams, they whipped her until she was silent. Alder's life was spared due to his appearance; his captors thought his black hair would allow him to pass as an Indian.

When the group reached the village, Alder learned why his life had been spared. One of the Mingo chiefs, Succohanos, and his wife, Whinecheoh, were an aging couple who had lost their son, and planned to adopt Alder as a replacement. Alder was forced to run the gauntlet, as a rite of passage, and after he exhibited bravery during the trial, he was adopted and cared for by Whinecheoh. The Indians' other prisoner, Mrs. Martin, had been promised to a man in another village, and was taken away during Alder's adoption ceremony.

== Native American life ==
The first few years that Alder lived with the Indians he was very ill, a condition Alder attributed to the Indians' diet. The other children in the village were friendly towards Alder, and worked together to teach him their language, customs, and traditions. In time, Alder fully adopted the Mingo way of life; he lived, hunted, and fought as an Indian. When he was old enough he was given an English musket, which he used to hunt mud turtles, wild turkeys, and raccoons. He was praised in the village for his hunting skills. He grew attached to his new life and when, in 1783, a trader from Kentucky offered to exchange him for a Shawnee prisoner, Alder refused. Alder was living in the Indian village of Mack-a-chack when it was destroyed by Benjamin Logan during his raid into Ohio Country in 1786, and he accompanied the Indians on raids into Kentucky to steal horses from white settlers.

In 1790, Whinecheoh died at the age of eighty, and Succohanos died in 1792 at the age of ninety. After their deaths, Alder wandered from village to village, and began courting an Indian woman from Upper Sandusky named Barshaw. In the fall of 1793, during the peak of the Northwest Indian War, he joined Shawnee chief Blue Jacket to defend against Anthony Wayne's attacks in the Ohio Country, and also took part in the attack on Fort Recovery on June 30, 1794. Alder was asked for advice on the 1795 Treaty of Greenville on land reservations, and urged by the Indians to attend its signing. Alder, not realizing the treaty's importance, chose not to attend.

== Life as settler ==
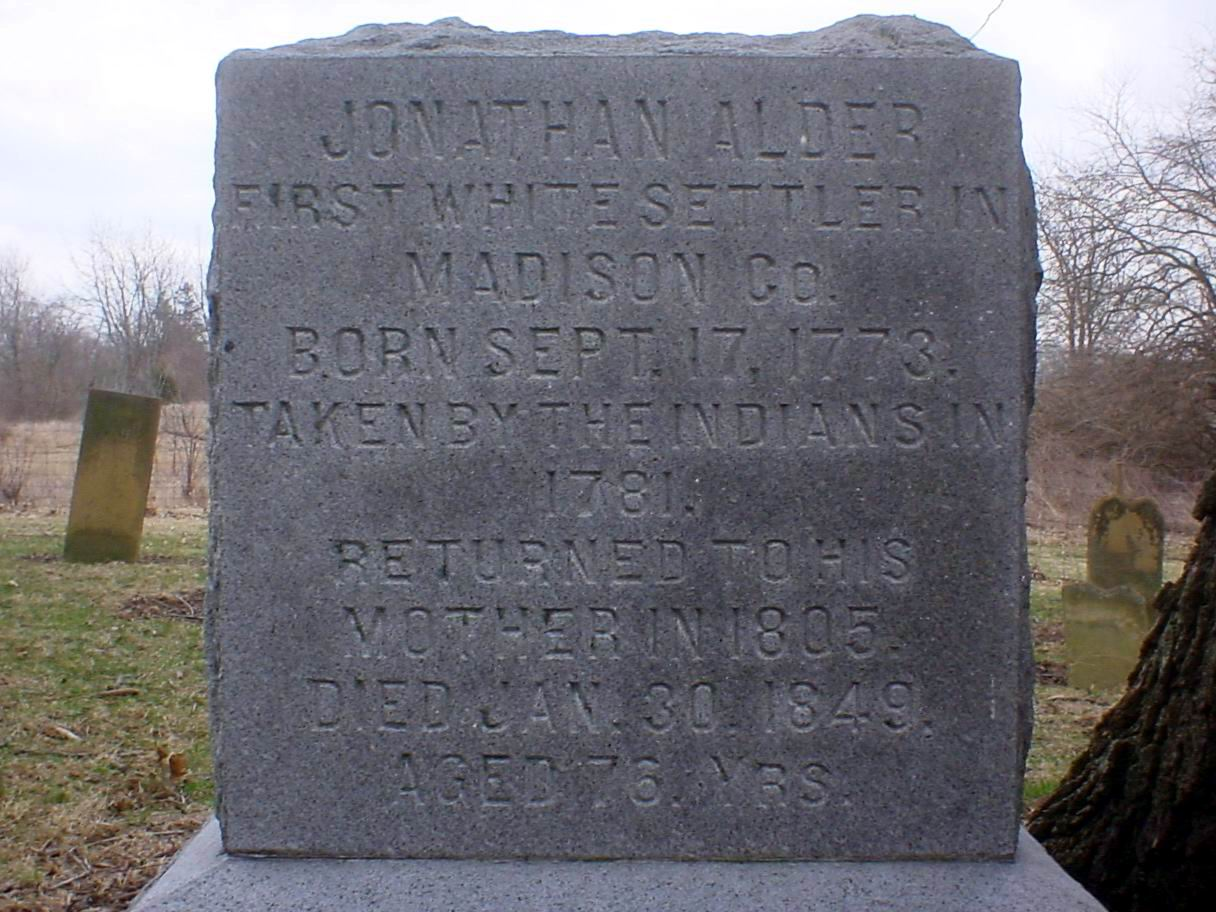
Alder's gravestone

In the summer after the signing of the Treaty of Greenville, which restored peace between Indians and settlers, Alder decided to return to the white community. He married Barshaw, and settled in Pleasant Valley, in the area of Jerome Township, about 5 miles (8 km) north of present-day Plain City, Ohio. He built a cabin, took up the lifestyle of a farmer, and raised hogs, cows and horses. He sold milk and butter he made to the Indians, and pork and horses to the whites. Alder began adopting the white community's habits, and learned English from the other white settlers. While living in Pleasant Valley, Barshaw struggled to integrate with settler life. She gave birth to two of Alder's children, but both died in infancy. The couple decided the Great Spirit was opposed to their marriage, and separated. Alder gave Barshaw most of the couple's property, including the cabin, all of the cows, seven horses, and about $200 in silver. Alder kept only two horses and the hogs.

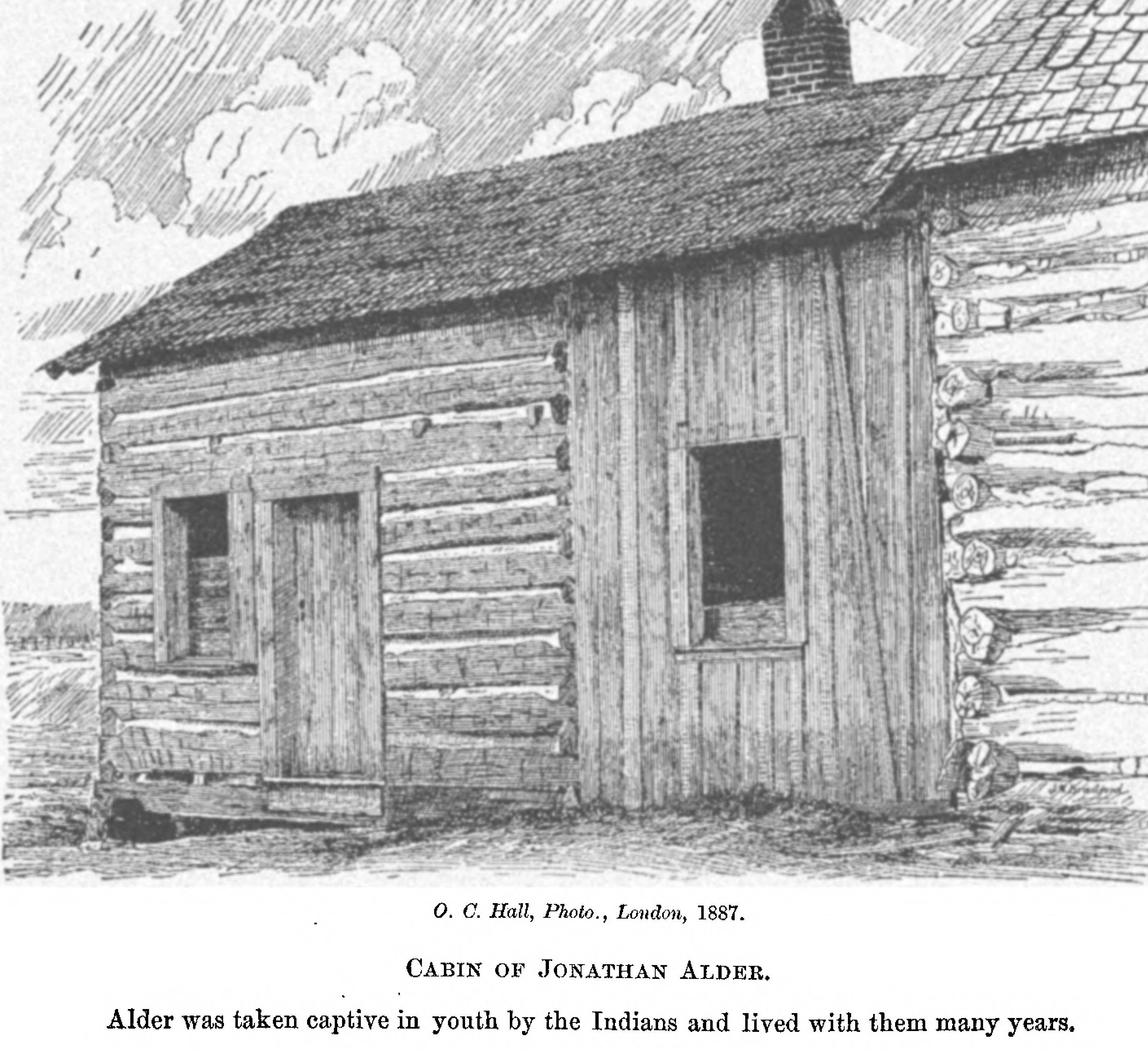
Alder's cabin

After some time, Alder developed interest in his original family in Virginia. A companion, John Moore, learned that Alder had been taken prisoner near Greenbrier, and traveled to Wythe County to search for Alder's family. Initial inquiries were unsuccessful, but one of a series of advertisements Moore placed in the district was seen by Alder's surviving brother Paul. Paul then wrote Jonathan to inform him that the family was still alive.

Alder left for Paul's house, with Moore, in November 1805. He and Moore arrived in Virginia the Sunday after New Year, and Alder was reunited with his biological mother and siblings. Alder stayed with his family in Virginia for over a year, and while visiting his family, he met and fell in love with Mary Ann Blont, a woman from Virginia. The couple were married on January 6, 1806, and in August 1806, Alder, Blont, and the rest of Alder's family returned to Pleasant Valley. Alder built another log cabin along the Big Darby Creek in 1806, and he and Mary had 12 children between 1808 and 1830.

== Military career ==
During the War of 1812, during the summer of 1812 or 1813, Alder was elected captain of a company of 70 men formed in Plain City. With Frederick Loyd as his lieutenant, Alder's company was ordered by the Governor to march about twenty miles north and build a blockhouse at Mill Creek, about three miles north of Marysville, Ohio, to protect the Darby settlements. The company built and garrisoned the blockhouse for a few weeks, but when a false alarm was sounded regarding Indians attacking the settlements, the men returned to their homes. This was the only fort ever constructed in Union County, and some of the foundation is still visible today.

After the war ended, Alder returned to the life of a farmer. He continued to visit the other former captives with whom he had become friends. In the fall of 1818, Alder received a visit from Simon Kenton, to share and compare stories. The two discovered that they had much in common, and had been at many of the same battles, even if they had been on opposite sides. They met several times up until 1828.

== Legacy ==
Living out the rest of his days as a farmer, Jonathan Alder died on January 30, 1849, in Canaan Township, Madison County, Ohio, at the age of 75. He had become a well-known figure in the region, and is still remembered today with a school district, high school, and junior high school named after him. A historical marker was erected by Ohio in front of Foster Chapel Cemetery at 39°59′42.31″N 83°15′48.11″W, near West Jefferson, where he is buried. The cabin Alder built in 1806 is now located at the Madison County Historical Society Museum in London.

== See also ==
- History of Ohio
