= Benjamin Logan Local School District =

School district in Ohio, United States

Address
- 4740 County Road 26 Bellefontaine, Ohio, 43311; United States

District information
- Type: Public
- Grades: K–12
- Schools: 3
- NCES District ID: 3904807

Students and staff
- Students: 1,591 (2025–2026)
- Teachers: 95.38 (on an FTE basis) (2025–2026)
- Staff: 159.50 (on an FTE basis) (2025–2026)
- Student–teacher ratio: 16.68 (2025–2026)

Other information
- Website: www.benjaminlogan.org

The Benjamin Logan Local School District, also known as "Benjamin Logan Schools", is a school district comprising the eastern half of Logan County, Ohio, United States. The district is noteworthy for its commitment to agribusiness education, as evidenced by a strong FFA chapter and ties with local college agricultural programs. The school district also partners with local colleges and the Honda corporation to provide teacher exchange opportunities at the middle and high school level and in-school courses in the Japanese language.

== History ==
The district was founded in 1970, consolidated from Buckeye Local Schools, Belle Center Schools, and Logan Hills Schools.

The school district is named after Benjamin Logan (1742–1802), an American pioneer, politician, and general of the Virginia militia.

== Schools ==
- Benjamin Logan High School
- Benjamin Logan Middle School
- Benjamin Logan Elementary School
