= Triad High School (North Lewisburg, Ohio) =

Location
- 8099 Brush Lake Road; North Lewisburg, (Champaign County), Ohio 43060; United States
- Coordinates: 40°10′35″N 83°34′55″W

Information
- Type: Public, Coeducational high school
- School district: Triad Local Schools
- Superintendent: Vickie Hoffman
- Principal: J. Kyle Huffman
- Grades: 9-12
- Average class size: 85
- Colors: Red and White
- Athletics conference: Ohio Heritage Conference
- Mascot: Cardinal
- Team name: Cardinals
- Rival: West Liberty Salem Tigers, Mechanicsburg Indians
- Website: https://hs.triadk12.org/

Triad High School is a public high school in North Lewisburg, Ohio. It is the only high school in the Triad Local School District.

== Ohio High School Athletic Association State Championships ==
- Girls Softball – 1992
