= London City School District =

School district in Ohio

The London City School District is a public school district in Madison County, Ohio, United States, serving the city of London.

== Schools ==
- London Elementary School
- London Middle School
- London High School
