= North Union High School (Ohio) =

Location
- 401 Franklin Street; Richwood, Ohio 45614; United States; 40°26′13″N 83°17′51″W

Information
- School type: Public High School
- School district: North Union Local School District
- Superintendent: Justin Ufferman
- Principal: Keith Conkling
- Teaching staff: 23.00 (FTE)
- Grades: 9-12
- Enrollment: 384 (2023-2024)
- Average class size: 21
- Colors: Orange and black
- Slogan: Prepare | Challenge | Empower
- Athletics conference: Central Buckeye Conference (CBC)
- Nickname: Wildcats
- Yearbook: CatTales
- Website: www.n-union.k12.oh.us/northunionhighschool_home.aspx

North Union High School is part of the North Union Local School District in northern Union County, Ohio, USA, with an October 2017 district enrollment of 1,520 students within a 162 square mile boundary line. The district is surrounded by farms with business and factories both to the north and south. The campus is located on the northern edge of Richwood.

Its attendance boundary includes Richwood and Magnetic Springs.

== Sports ==
In the 2011–12 season, the American football and girls' basketball teams won their third consecutive MOAC titles. The football team advanced to the OHSAA playoffs for the third consecutive year and the girls' basketball team advanced to the District Finals.

In July 2017, North Union announced they would leave the MOAC to join the Central Buckeye Conference, possibly as early as 2018.

During the 2019–20 high school basketball season, North Union completed a perfect 21–0 regular season. The Wildcats entered the OHSAA state tournament as the No. 3 seed in the Division III Central District with a chance to win their first district title since 1970.
