= Urbana High School (Ohio) =

Location
- 500 Washington Avenue; Urbana, Ohio 43078; United States
- Coordinates: 40°6′46″N 83°44′34″W

Information
- Type: Public
- School district: Urbana City School District
- NCES School ID: 390449401874
- Principal: Nathan Sever
- Teaching staff: 30.00 (FTE)
- Grades: 9–12
- Enrollment: 528 (2024–25)
- Student to teacher ratio: 17.60
- Colors: Maroon and white
- Fight song: Across the Field; Fight On, Urbana
- Athletics conference: Central Buckeye Conference
- Mascot: Sparky
- Team name: Hillclimbers
- Rival: Bellefontaine High School; Graham High School
- Accreditation: Ohio Department of Education
- Yearbook: The Tower
- Website: hs.urbanacityschools.org/o/uhs

Urbana High School (UHS) is a public high school in Urbana, Ohio, United States, serving students in grades nine through 12. It is the only high school in the Urbana City School District and had a student enrollment of 528 as of the 2024–25 school year. Athletic teams are known as the Hillclimbers and the school colors are maroon and white. UHS was rated as Excellent by the Ohio Department of Education in 2011 and 2012.

== History ==
After creation of the district on April 28, 1849, the original high school building was constructed in 1874 with approved local bonds of initially $60,000, and later increased by $20,000. The last of these bonds were paid off in 1896, and unfortunately this building burnt down due to an unexplained fire on December 12, 1896. The flames from the fire were bright enough to be seen from Piqua, St. Paris, Springfield, and West Liberty. Insurance on the building, totaling $20,000 by the district, allowed for a new high school to be built on the same location as the original building. Construction was completed in the fall of 1897, and the building was designed to resemble a castle on top of the city's highest point, which became commonly referred to as "The Castle".

An addition of a junior high building attached to the north end of the high school building was completed in 1930, with the castle then named the "William McK. Vance Building". On December 12, 1930, exactly 34 years after the original building had been destroyed in a fire, the high school building caught fire again. While the castle burned, the newly adjoined building was spared due to the implementation of fire-proof construction. The origin of this fire was also unknown, but the castle was immediately remodeled, and continued to function as class space for the Urbana Junior High School until April 2018. Further additions to the original buildings have been made over the years, with the most recent of these permanent additions completed in the mid 1950s.

In November 2014, voters of the district approved a 7.15-mill, 28-year building levy for a new high school building on the current property of the high school and junior high school, along with consolidating the district's four (K-2, 3-4, 5-6, and 7-8) elementary and junior high buildings into a single facility. Construction was completed on a new building in April 2018. The new high school was built directly behind the current high school, allowing "The Castle" and the former gymnasium/auditorium building to remain standing on the hill and in use by the district.

== Athletics ==
Athletic teams are known as the Hillclimbers and their mascot is named Sparky. Fall sports include football, boys and girls soccer, boys and girls golf, boys and girls cross country, girls tennis, and girls volleyball. Winter sports include boys and girls basketball, wrestling, boys and girls swimming, and boys and girls bowling. Spring sports include baseball, softball, boys tennis, and boys and girls track and field.

=== State championships ===
- Girls volleyball – 1976
- Baseball – 1982, 1990
- Girls basketball – 1992, 1993
- Boys bowling – 2016
- Girls bowling - 2025

== Notable people ==
- Pete Dye, golf course designer
- Robert L. Eichelberger, General in the United States Army
- Beth Macy, journalist and author
