= Ohio Heritage Conference =

High-school athletic league in Ohio, United States

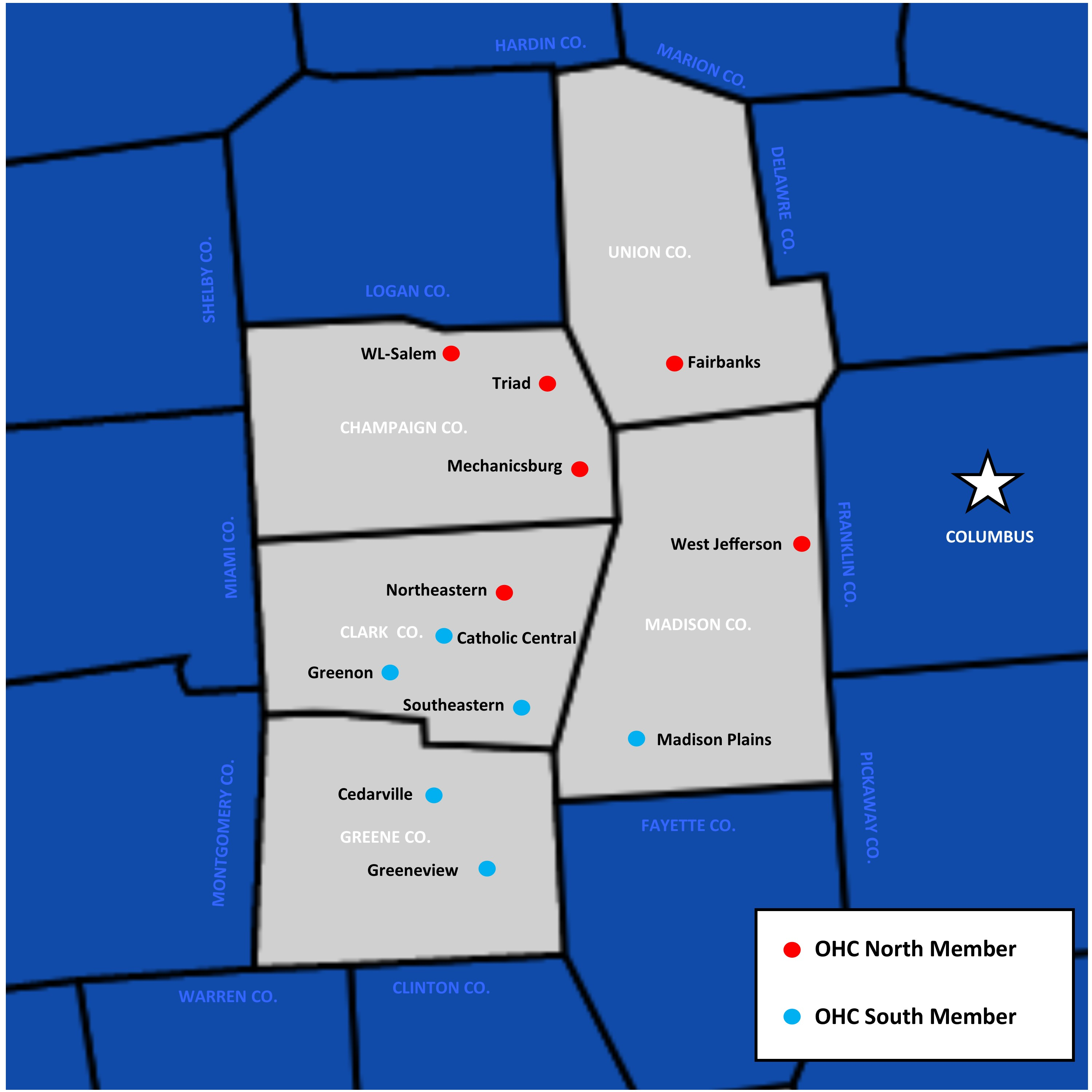
OHC Member Schools are located in 5 Ohio counties (Champaign, Clark, Greene, Union and Madison).

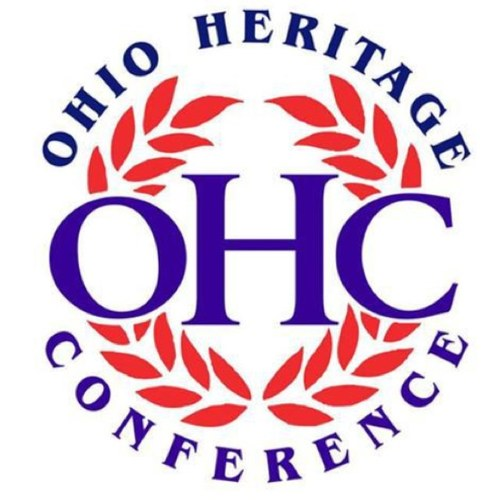
The official logo of the Ohio Heritage Conference

The Ohio Heritage Conference is an OHSAA athletic league whose members are located in the Ohio counties of Champaign, Clark, Madison, Greene and Union. The league was established in the fall of 2001.

== Current Members ==
NORTH DIVISION						
School	Nickname	Location	Colors	Year Joined	Previous Conference	Enrollment
Fairbanks	Panthers	Milford Center		2016*	Mid-Ohio Athletic Conference	291
Mechanicsburg	Indians	Mechanicsburg		2001	West Central Ohio Conference	218
Northeastern	Jets	Springfield		2001	Central Buckeye Conference	260
Triad	Cardinals	North Lewisburg		2001	West Central Ohio Conference	209
West Jefferson	Rough Riders	West Jefferson		2017	Mid State League	234
West Liberty-Salem	Tigers	West Liberty		2001	West Central Ohio Conference	285

SOUTH DIVISION						
School	Nickname	Location	Colors	Year Joined	Previous Conference	Enrollment
Catholic Central	Irish	Springfield		2001	Southwestern Rivers Conference	104
Cedarville	Indians	Cedarville		2001	Kenton Trace Conference	143
Greeneview	Rams	Jamestown		2001	Kenton Trace Conference	303
Greenon	Knights	Springfield		2017	Central Buckeye Conference	382
Madison Plains	Golden Eagles	London		2016*	Mid State League	297
Southeastern	Trojans	South Charleston		2001	Kenton Trace Conference	154

* Fairbanks and Madison Plains joined the Ohio Heritage Conference in the winter of 2016.

== Membership Timeline ==
Source:

== History ==
The Ohio Heritage Conference was established in 2001 with the charter schools being Catholic Central, Cedarville, Greeneview, Mechanicsburg, Northeastern, Southeastern, Triad and West Liberty-Salem.

In 2015, the OHC announced that Fairbanks and Madison Plains would join the conference. Both schools officially joined the conference for the winter sports season in 2016.

In 2016, the OHC announced that Greenon and West Jefferson would join the conference. Both schools officially joined the conference for the fall sports season in 2017.

== Sponsored Sports ==
The OHC supports 23 league sports for both male and female competition.

BOYS
	Baseball	Basketball	Bowling	Cross Country	Football	Golf	Soccer	Swimming	Tennis	Track & Field	Wrestling
Catholic Central	check	check	check	check	check	check	check	check	check	check	check
Cedarville	check	check		check	check	check			check	check	
Fairbanks	check	check	check	check	check	check	check	check		check	check
Greeneview	check	check	check	check	check	check	check	check	check	check	check
Greenon	check	check	check	check	check	check	check	check	check	check	check
Madison Plains	check	check	check	check	check	check	check			check	check
Mechanicsburg	check	check	check	check	check	check		check		check	check
Northeastern	check	check	check	check	check	check	check	check	check	check	check
Southeastern	check	check	check	check	check	check				check	check
Triad	check	check		check	check	check				check	check
West Jefferson	check	check			check	check	check		check	check	check
West Liberty-Salem	check	check	check	check	check	check	check	check		check	check

GIRLS
	Basketball	Bowling	Cross Country	Golf	Gymnastics	Soccer	Softball	Swimming	Tennis	Track & Field	Volleyball
Catholic Central	check	check	check	check	check	check	check	check	check	check	check
Cedarville	check		check				check			check	check
Fairbanks	check	check	check	check	check	check	check	check		check	check
Greeneview	check	check	check	check	check	check	check	check	check	check	check
Greenon	check	check	check	check		check	check	check	check	check	check
Madison Plains	check		check	check		check	check			check	check
Mechanicsburg	check	check	check	check	check	check	check	check		check	check
Northeastern	check	check	check	check		check	check	check		check	check
Southeastern	check	check	check			check	check			check	check
Triad	check		check	check			check			check	check
West Jefferson	check			check		check	check			check	check
West Liberty-Salem	check	check	check	check		check	check	check		check	check

League champions for each sport are recognized in both the North Division and South Division.

== OHC All-Sports Championships ==
Below is a list of the OHC school(s) that has been awarded the most conference championships (all sports) each year:

OHC All-Sports Championships (Team)
Year	School	Championships
23-24	West Liberty-Salem	8
22-23	West Liberty-Salem & Greeneview	6
21-22	West Liberty-Salem & Mechanicsburg	5
20-21	Greeneview	6
19-20	Greeneview, Greenon & West Liberty-Salem	4
18-19	Fairbanks & West Liberty-Salem	5
17-18	West Liberty-Salem	7
16-17	West Liberty-Salem	6
15-16	West Liberty-Salem	7
14-15	West Liberty-Salem	6
13-14	West Liberty-Salem	5
12-13	West Liberty-Salem	8
11-12	West Liberty-Salem	7
10-11	West Liberty-Salem	8
09-10	West Liberty-Salem	8
08-09	Northeastern & West Liberty-Salem	4
07-08	West Liberty-Salem	4
06-07	Greeneview	5
05-06	West Liberty-Salem	8
04-05	West Liberty-Salem	7
03-04	Southeastern & West Liberty-Salem	4
02-03	West Liberty-Salem	5
01-02	Southeastern	5

Below is a list of OHC Championships won by each member school since the OHC's inception.

OHC Team Championships by School (Total)
OHC School	OHC Championships	Last Championship
Catholic Central	36	2021-2022
Cedarville	21	2023-2024
Fairbanks	28	2023-2024
Greeneview	62	2023-2024
Greenon	22	2022-2023
Madison Plains	5	2020-2021
Mechanicsburg	70	2023-2024
Northeastern	33	2022-2023
Southeastern	33	2023-2024
Triad	21	2014-2015
West Jefferson	11	2023-2024
West Liberty-Salem	136	2023-2024

== State Championships ==
YEAR	SCHOOL	SPORT
2021-2022	Mechanicsburg	Bowling - Boys
2020-2021	West Liberty-Salem	Track & Field - Girls
2020-2021	West Liberty-Salem	Cross Country - Girls
2020-2021	Mechanicsburg	Bowling - Boys
2018-2019	West Liberty-Salem	Track & Field - Girls
2018-2019	Mechanicsburg	Bowling - Boys
2017-2018	Mechanicsburg	Wrestling
2016-2017	Mechanicsburg	Bowling - Girls
2014-2016	Mechanicsburg	Bowling - Boys
2005-2006	Greeneview	Soccer - Boys
1991-1992	Triad	Softball
1991-1992	West Liberty-Salem	Wrestling
1982-1983	West Jefferson	Football
1979-1980	West Liberty-Salem	Cross Country - Boys
1978-1979	West Liberty-Salem	Cross Country - Boys
1977-1978	West Jefferson	Football
1977-1978	West Liberty-Salem	Cross Country - Boys
1976-1977	West Jefferson	Football
1976-1977	West Liberty-Salem	Cross Country - Boys
1962-1963	West Jefferson	Football
1960-1961	West Liberty-Salem	Basketball - Boys

== Conference Rivalries ==
West Liberty-Salem vs Mechanicsburg (since 1929, consecutively since 1964)

West Liberty-Salem vs Triad

Triad vs Mechanicsburg

Cedarville vs Greeneview

Cedarville vs Southeastern

Southeastern vs Greeneview

Southeastern vs Madison Plains

West Jefferson vs Madison Plains

West Jefferson vs Mechanicsburg
