= Tippecanoe High School =

- 615 E. Kessler-Cowlesville Road; Tipp City, Ohio 45371; United States

Information
- Type: Public High School
- Motto: Where Excellence is a Tradition
- School district: Tipp City Exempted Village Schools
- CEEB code: 364995
- Principal: Katherine Weaver
- Teaching staff: 43.09 (on an FTE basis)
- Grades: 9-12
- Enrollment: 735 (2023–2024)
- Student to teacher ratio: 17.06
- Colors: Red and White
- Athletics: Baseball, Basketball, Bowling, Cheerleading, Cross Country, Football, Golf, Soccer, Softball, Swimming, Tennis, Track & Field, Volleyball, Wrestling
- Mascot: Red Devil
- Newspaper: The Birchbark
- Website: Tippecanoe High School

Tippecanoe High School is a public high school in Tipp City, Ohio, a suburb of Dayton. It is the only high school in the Tipp City Exempted Village Schools district. According to US News 2016 Ranking of High Schools, Tippecanoe High School is 95th in Ohio and 1919th in the US. The mascot of the school is the Red Devil. As of 2019-20, the Red Devils are a member of the Miami Valley League (MVL).

== Ohio High School Athletic Association State Championships ==
- Boys Cross Country - 2014
- Boys Soccer - 2019, 2023
- Girls Volleyball - 2025

== Clubs and activities ==
=== Academic Quiz Team ===
The Tippecanoe HS Academic Quiz Team program was established in the 1995 fall semester. They have participated on the local TV show High Q and have won three times (1996-1997, 2003-2004, 2006–2007).

== Notable alumni ==
- Steven Reineke - Conductor of The New York Pops.
- Rachael Bade - Political reporter for The Washington Post.
- Ben Sauls - Placekicker for Pittsburgh Steelers.
- Cricket Wampler - Actress.
