= Treaty of Lewistown =

1829 land cession by the Seneca and Shawnee tribes in Lewistown, Ohio, United States

On August 3, 1829, members of the Shawnee Indians and the Seneca Indians signed the Treaty of Lewistown with the United States. In this treaty, Senecas and Shawnees living at Lewistown, Ohio, relinquished their claim to the land and joined the rest of the Ohio Senecas already living on a reservation west of the Mississippi River.

The United States government granted this group of about three hundred Indians 60,000 acres (240 km^{2}) of land in the west and a six thousand dollar advance on the sale of their Ohio lands. In addition, the United States presented the natives with blankets, plows, axes, hoes, rifles, and other supplies.

On July 20, 1831, James B. Gardiner, acting on behalf of U.S. President Andrew Jackson, signed the treaty which stipulated, in part:
