= Northwestern High School (German Township, Clark County, Ohio) =

Northwestern Jr./Sr. High School

Location
- 5780 Troy Road; Springfield, Clark County, Ohio 45502; United States; 39°59′30″N 83°54′35″W

Information
- Type: Public high school
- Superintendent: Ryan Rismiller
- Teaching staff: 32.00 (FTE)
- Grades: 9-12
- Student to teacher ratio: 22.12
- Colors: Red; Blue
- Slogan: "Valuing one another, working with one another, succeeding together."
- Fight song: Go Northwestern Go!
- Athletics conference: Central Buckeye Conference
- Mascot: Warrior
- Team name: Warriors
- Rival: Southeastern
- Website: northwestern.k12.oh.us

Northwestern High School is a public high school in German Township, Clark County, Ohio, near Springfield. It is the only high school in the Northwestern Local Schools district.

== History ==
The school itself is a 1948 consolidation of North Hampton and Lawrenceville high schools, deriving its name from the northwest portion of Clark County. Accordingly, the school serves the residents of North Hampton and Lawrenceville as well as the villages of Tremont City, Dialton and Upper Fox Hollow, and adjacent rural areas in Pike and German Townships.

The district opened two new school buildings, an elementary and a high school, in the fall of 2013. All remaining buildings were demolished, and the middle school ceased to exist. In 2018, the district has opened a new Athletic Complex near its stadium.

== The Ohio High School Athletic Association State Championships ==
- Girls' volleyball – 1983, 1984, 1986, 1987
- Boys' basketball - 1933*

* won by Lawrenceville High School prior to consolidation into Northwestern

== Notable alumni ==
- Robert D. Hatcher, geologist
