= Lewistown, Ohio =

- Census-designated place
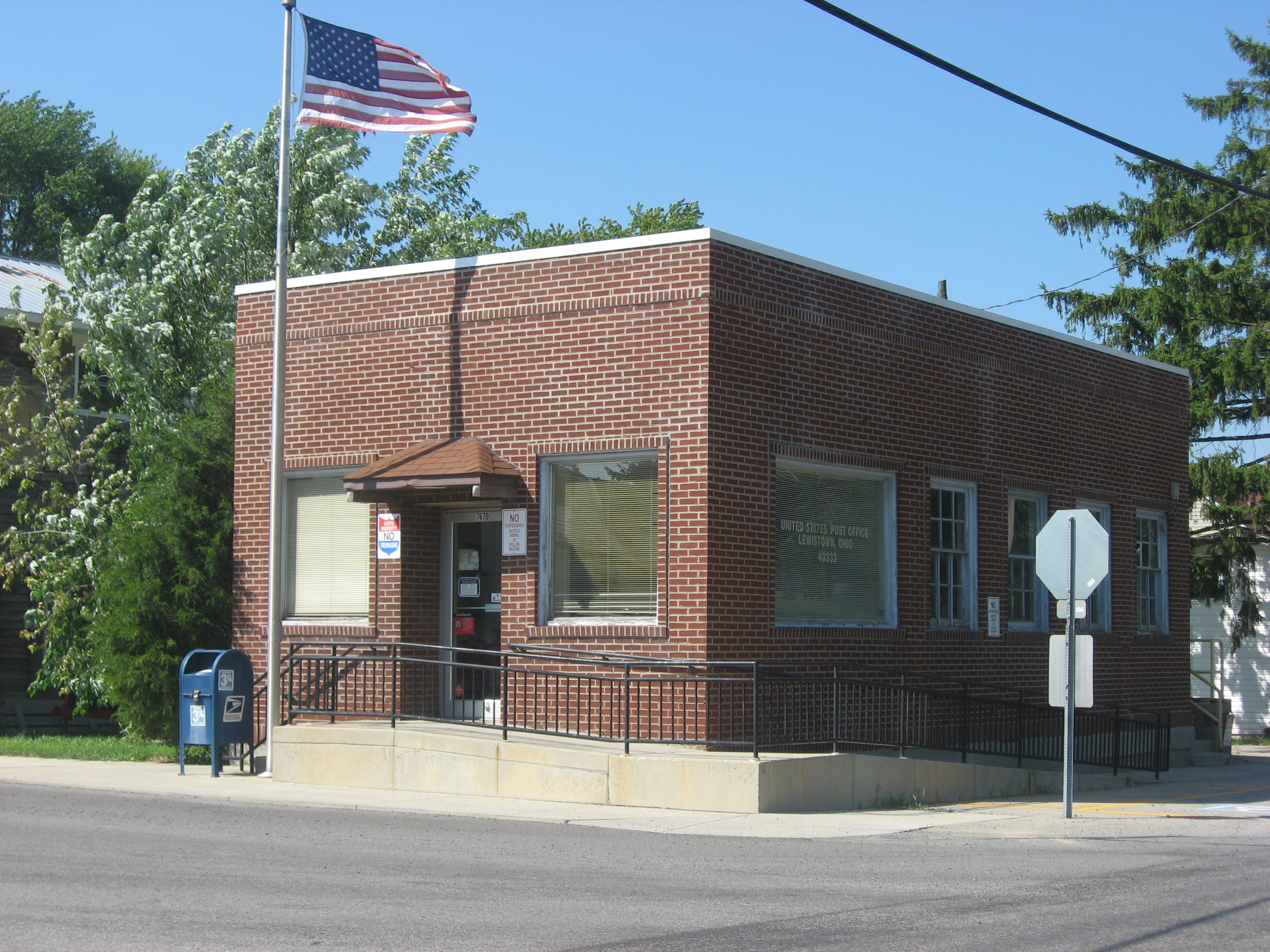
- Post office in Lewistown

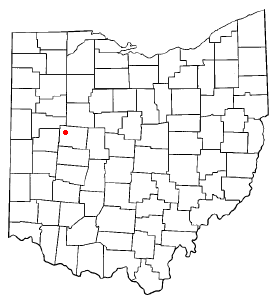
- Location of Lewistown, Ohio
- Coordinates: 40°25′26″N 83°53′05″W
- Country: United States
- State: Ohio
- County: Logan
- Township: Washington

Area
  - Total: 0.77 sq mi (1.99 km^{2})
  - Land: 0.77 sq mi (1.99 km^{2})
  - Water: 0 sq mi (0.00 km^{2})
- Elevation: 1,004 ft (306 m)

Population (2020)
  - Total: 202
  - Density: 263.2/sq mi (101.61/km^{2})
- Time zone: UTC-5 (Eastern (EST))
  - Summer (DST): UTC-4 (EDT)
- ZIP code: 43333
- FIPS code: 39-42966
- GNIS feature ID: 2628925

Lewistown (also Lewis Town or Lewiston) is an unincorporated community and census-designated place (CDP) in central Washington Township, Logan County, Ohio, United States. As of the 2020 census, the population was 202.

Until the 1829 Treaty of Lewistown, the community was the site of a Shawnee Native American reservation, also called Lewistown, named after Captain John Lewis, a Shawnee leader. Nearby Indian Lake was once known as the Lewistown Reservoir, after this settlement. It has a post office with the ZIP code 43333.

== History ==
=== Native Americans ===
The area around Lewistown was populated by several Native American tribes resettled as a result of the Treaty of Fort Meigs. This treaty, signed on September 29, 1817, also provided for the University of Michigan, as well as other grants.

In the 1820s Lewistown was a village primarily inhabited by Seneca and Shawnee people. It was also the eastern point in a reservation for these groups that stretched westward to the headwaters of Loramie Creek.

The Treaty of Lewistown caused the resettlement of about 300 people to "the western side of the Mississippi river", contiguous to lands reserved in previous treaties to Shawnee, Seneca, and Cherokee.

=== Euro-American settlers ===
During the residence of the Indians in Washington Township, as early as 1820, only few white men lived in the area. "They were doubtless squatters, and their stay brief, as no one knows anything of their subsequent history. In the summer of 1832, immediately following the departure of the Indians, a few white families came into the township and began settlement." One of the first permanent settlers was Henry Hanford, a native of Connecticut. Till 1835 Hanford purchased 825 acres (3.34 km^{2}) of land in and around Lewistown.

Daniel Conley, "the pioneer shoemaker in the place" and Hanford's brother-in-law, built the first frame house in the "village". Later Henry Hanford opened a general store and became the first postmaster of Lewistown. Mail was delivered once a week. A semiweekly hack line ran from Bellefontaine to Anna Station, via Lewistown. In 1835 a mill was erected, followed by a steam sawmill. In 1840, a "tavern" (actually more of an inn) began operation in the community. A distillery followed in 1862, but was confiscated by the government when it failed to make tax returns. Till 1880 a tannery concluded the industries of the township.

== Geography ==
Lewistown is located in northwestern Logan County at the intersection of County Roads 54 and 91, a short distance south of State Route 274 and a short distance east of State Route 235. It is 4 miles (6 km) south of Russells Point on Indian Lake and 8 miles (13 km) northwest of Bellefontaine, the Logan county seat.

According to the U.S. Census Bureau, the Lewistown CDP has an area of 0.77 square miles (2.0 km^{2}), all of it recorded as land.

Rennick Creek runs through the southern side of the community, flowing west 1.5 miles (2.4 km) to the Great Miami River.

== Demographics ==
Historical population
Census	Pop.	Note	%±
2020	202		—
U.S. Decennial Census

As of the census of 2000, there were 693 people, 255 households, and 193 families residing in the ZIP Code Tabulation Area (ZCTA) for Lewistown's post office. There are 273 housing units in the ZCTA. The racial makeup of the ZCTA was 98.7% White, 0.1% African American, 0.1% Native American, 0.0% Asian, 0.1% Pacific Islander, 0.0% from other races, and 0.9% from two or more races. Hispanic or Latino of any race were 0.4% of the population.

There were 255 households, out of which 37.3% had children under the age of 18 living with them, 65.1% were married couples living together, 5.5% had a female householder with no husband present, and 24.3% were non-families. 20.4% of all households were made up of individuals, and 9.4% had someone living alone who was 65 years of age or older. The average household size was 2.72 and the average family size was 3.12.

In the ZCTA the population was spread out, with 25.8% under the age of 18, 7.5% from 18 to 24, 31.8% from 25 to 44, 24.9% from 45 to 64, and 10.0% who were 65 years of age or older. The median age was 36.2 years. For every 100 females, there were 102.0 males. For every 100 females age 18 and over, there were 103.2 males.

The median income for a household in the ZCTA was $36,534, and the median income for a family was $61,458. Males had a median income of $37,396 versus $20,363 for females. The per capita income for the ZCTA was $20,187. About 12.0% of families and 8.9% of the population were below the poverty line, including 1.1% of those under age 18 and 11.1% of those age 65 or over.

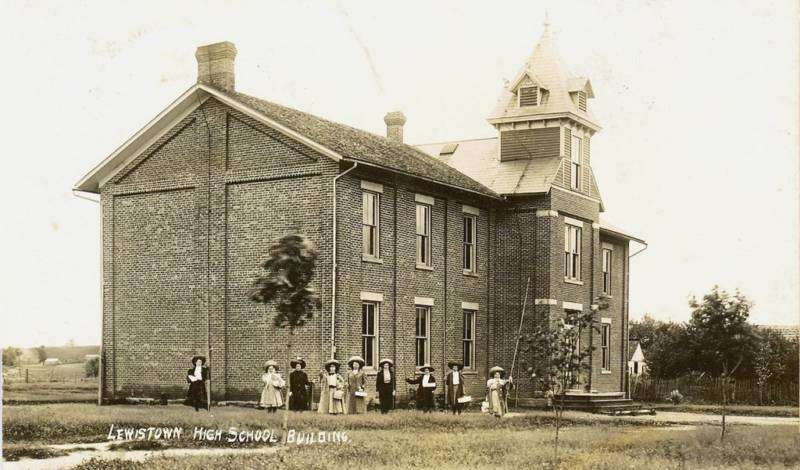
Lewistown High School (circa 1895)

== Education ==
A school was founded in the community in 1833; this was one of the first schools to be built in the lands north of the Greenville Treaty Line. Earlier schools were founded on the Connecticut Western Reserve in 1808, Columbia Township, and 1819 in Elyria. This school was initially housed in a log cabin, but was moved to a frame building in 1840. The Lewistown special school district was founded in 1874; this district is now known as the Indian Lake Local Schools.

Future Los Angeles Dodgers manager Walter Alston once taught shop and coached basketball in the Lewistown building under an arrangement which left him free to participate in baseball with the Dodgers minor league organization. When the school board finally asked him to choose between organizations, the future Baseball Hall of Fame member wisely picked the Dodgers, for whom he managed major league teams in Brooklyn and Los Angeles for 23 seasons. Alston's former high school players were regular guests at Dodgers games in Cincinnati, and he always introduced them to his current players as "my first team". Although he never coached at the current Indian Lake High School, its gym honors his memory as the Walter Alston Gymnasium.

The Indian Lake Local Schools operate three schools in the northwestern part of Logan County. Indian Lake Elementary School, Indian Lake Middle School and Indian Lake High School are located close enough to Lewistown to be served by the post office there (ZIP code: 43333).
