= Arnett Howard =

American Jazz musician (1950-)

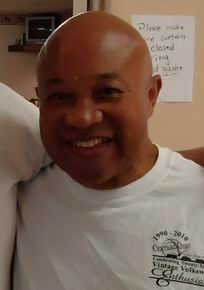

Background information
- Born: September 6, 1950 (age 75); Welch, West Virginia, U.S.
- Genres: Jazz
- Occupation: Musician
- Instruments: Trumpet, keyboards
- Years active: 1967–present

Arnett Howard (born September 6, 1950) is an American jazz musician, journalist, teacher, historian, and ambassador for Columbus, Ohio.

== Career ==
Arnett was born September 6, 1950, in Welch, West Virginia, but was raised in Plain City, Ohio. In 1968, he graduated from Jonathan Alder High School, where he played trumpet in the school's marching band. After high school, he started taking classes at Capital University in 1968 but left in 1970 to pursue a musical career. He graduated from Capital in 1999. Howard returned to Capital University in 2007 to teach a class called "Columbus Jazz History".

He co-wrote the books Columbus: The Musical Crossroads, Listen for the Jazz: Key Notes in Columbus History, and Ohio Jazz: A History of Jazz in the Buckeye State.

Howard started playing music professionally in 1967. He was a member of local bands The Soul Internationals, The Vadicans, The Metronomes, Dave Workman's Blues Band, Cash McCall and his Bumswipe Blues Band Boys, and The Soul Superbs. He led Arnett Howard's Creole Funk Band from 1988 to 2002. He retired from Creole Funk Band in 2002.

== Discography ==
- Arnett Howard's Creole Funk Band (1987)
- Live at Victory's (1988)
- Lancaster Festival Live (1989)
- Ten For Ten (1994)
- Arnett Howard's Rocket '88's (1996)
- Kidding Around (1997)
- Joyful Music, Generous Spirit (2001)
- Extended Family (2002)
- Final Funk (2003)
- Fiyah on the Bayou (2003)
- I'm a Walkin', Talkin' Pair of Pants (2003)
- Elijah's Wooden Book (2003)
- Welcome to the Lancaster Festival (2005)
- Arnett Howard Christmas (2005)
