= Robert D. Hatcher =

American geologist and professor

Robert Dean Hatcher Jr. (born October 22, 1940, in Madison, Tennessee) is an American structural geologist, known as one of the world's leading experts on the geology of the southern and central Appalachians.

== Biography ==
Hatcher attended high school at Springfield, Ohio's Northwestern High School, where he graduated in 1957. At Vanderbilt University, he graduated in 1961 with a B.A. (major in geology and chemistry, minor in mathematics) and in 1962 with a M.S. (major in geology, minor in chemistry). In 1965 he received a Ph.D. in structural geology from the University of Tennessee, Knoxville (UTK) with thesis supervised by George David Swingle (1922–1973). In 1965 Hatcher married Diana Simpson. After about one year as an employee of the Humble Oil and Refining Company (now merged into ExxonMobil), he was appointed an assistant professor at Clemson University. There he was promoted to full professor and taught geology and mineralogy from 1966 to 1979. He and his family in 1978 moved to Tallahassee, Florida, where he was appointed a professor of geology at Florida State University and in 1980 moved to Columbia, South Carolina, where he was a professor until 1988 at the University of South Carolina. In 1986 he returned to Tennessee, where he accepted a joint appointment at the University of Tennessee, Knoxville (UTK) and at Oak Ridge National Laboratory (ORNL) as Distinguished Scientist and Professor of Earth and Planetary Sciences. In 2000 he terminated his position at ORNL but continued as professor at UTK until he retired as professor emeritus in 2018. From 1981 to 1988 Hatcher was the co-editor-in-chief, with William Andrew Thomas (1936–2022), of the Geological Society of America Bulletin.

Hatcher has been concerned about geological aspects of nuclear waste disposal and nuclear reactor safety. For disposal of radioactive waste, he served from 1984 to 1986 as science adviser to South Carolina governor Richard Riley. Hatcher served from 1990 to 1996 on the National Academy of Sciences (NAS) Board on Radioactive Waste Management and from 1993 to 1996 on a Nuclear Regulatory Commission Federal Advisory Committee on reactor safety.

== Research ==
Hatcher's research involves fieldwork more than theory. Most of his research is interdisciplinary, combining wide knowledge from the geosciences. The goal of much of his research is the better understand the evolution of continental crust, by means of studying mountain chains and mature crust. His research on structural geology has focused on "large faults, mountain chains, formation and breakup of supercontinents, and neotectonics." He is the author or co-author of more than 200 scientific publications and the co-author or co-editor of several books. Although he has been mostly concerned with the Appalachians, he has several times visited the North American Cordillera in Canada and the US, the Caledonides in the U.K. and Scandinavia, the Alps, Morocco's High Atlas and Meseta, the Tatra Mountains, and the Southern Andes in Argentina. He has also done smaller amounts of fieldwork in China's Qinling (Qin Mountains), the Olkhon region in Siberia, the Mexican Cordillera, and several other regions.

Beginning in the 1970s, he was a leader in the plate tectonic reassessment of the tectonics of the Ridge-and-Valley Appalachians using terrane analysis. The reassessment was motivated by the search for oil and gas caused by the oil crisis in the 1970s. With Jack E. Oliver, Sidney Kaufman (1908–2008), and other colleagues, he used COCORP seismic-reflection profiling to investigate a seismic transversal in the southern Appalachians. They discovered that the Blue Ridge Mountains formed a 200 km long tectonic blanket similar to that observed in the Alps. His geological map of the Appalachians was published in 1990 and replaced that of Harold Williams. With Harold Williams he wrote the important paper Suspect terranes and accretionary history of the Appalachian orogen published in 1982 in the journal Geology.

For many years, Hatcher wanted to do fieldwork related to earthquakes that do not occur on plate boundaries. In 2008 Hatcher was part of a group of geoscientists who received funding from the Nuclear Regulatory Commission (NRC) to investigate the paleoseismology of the Eastern Tennessee seismic zone. This seismic zone is the second most active in the eastern USA – the New Madrid seismic zone being the most active. In 2012 he and his colleagues "found a thrust fault east of Knoxville that displaced bedrock for about one meter over Quaternary river sediment."

He was instrumental in the planned Appalachian Deep Hole Project (ADCOH), which was proposed for deep drilling through the overthrust of the Blue Ridge Mountains into underlying sedimentary rocks. Although the project was eventually cancelled, preliminary work on the project brought important insights into the tectonics of the Appalachians and was published in a report.

Hatcher has been the leader or co-leader of more than 40 field trips for professional societies and meetings and is the author or co-author of numerous field trip guidebooks. He and his colleagues have done research on "crustal-scale faults, large crystalline thrust sheets, lithotectonic terranes, geophysics, stratigraphy, and paleoseismicity."

== Awards and honors ==
In 1989 Hatcher was elected a Fellow of the American Association for the Advancement of Science. He is also a Fellow of the Geological Society of America (GSA) and the American Geosciences Institute (AGI). He was in 1993 the president of the GSA and in 1996 the president of the AGI. From the GSA, he received in 1988 the GSA Distinguished Service Award, in 2006 the Penrose Medal, and in 2020 the Florence Bascom Geologic Mapping Award. He received in 1997 from the American Association of Petroleum Geologists (AAPG) the I. C. White Award and in 2001 from the AAPG's Eastern Section the John T. Galey Award. The AGI awarded him in 2006 the Ian Campbell Medal and in 2014 the Marcus Milling Legendary Geoscientist Medal. Among other honors and awards, he was made in 1998 an honorary citizen of West Virginia by that state's governor (Cecil H. Underwood).

== Selected publications ==
=== Articles ===
- Cook, Frederick A.; Albaugh, Dennis S.; Brown, Larry D.; Kaufman, Sidney; Oliver, Jack E.; Hatcher, Robert D. (1979). "Thin-skinned tectonics in the crystalline southern Appalachians; COCORP seismic-reflection profiling of the Blue Ridge and Piedmont". Geology. 7 (12): 563. Bibcode:1979Geo.....7..563C. doi:10.1130/0091-7613(1979)7<563:TTITCS>2.0.CO;2. ISSN 0091-7613. (over 600 citations)
- Williams, Harold; Hatcher, Robert D. (1982). "Suspect terranes and accretionary history of the Appalachian orogen". Geology. 10 (10): 530. Bibcode:1982Geo....10..530W. doi:10.1130/0091-7613(1982)10<530:STAAHO>2.0.CO;2. ISSN 0091-7613. (over 450 citations)
- Williams, Harold; Hatcher, Robert D. (1983). "Appalachian suspect terranes". Contributions to the Tectonics and Geophysics of Mountain Chains. Geological Society of America Memoirs. Vol. 158. pp. 33–53. doi:10.1130/MEM158-p33. ISBN 0-8137-1158-4.
- Williams, Harold; Hatcher, Robert D. (1983). "Appalachian suspect terranes". Contributions to the Tectonics and Geophysics of Mountain Chains. Geological Society of America Memoirs. Vol. 158. pp. 33–53. doi:10.1130/MEM158-p33. ISBN 0-8137-1158-4.
- Wise, D. U.; Dunn, D. E.; Engelder, J. T.; Geiser, P. A.; Hatcher, R. D.; Kish, S. A.; Odom, A. L.; Schamel, S. (1984). "Fault-related rocks: Suggestions for terminology". Geology. 12 (7): 391. Bibcode:1984Geo....12..391W. doi:10.1130/0091-7613(1984)12<391:FRSFT>2.0.CO;2. ISSN 0091-7613.
- Hatcher, R. D. (1987). "Tectonics of the Southern and Central Appalachian Internides". Annual Review of Earth and Planetary Sciences. 15: 337–362. Bibcode:1987AREPS..15..337H. doi:10.1146/annurev.ea.15.050187.002005.
- Hatcher Jr., Robert D.; Thomas, William A.; Geiser, Peter A.; Snoke, Arthur W.; Mosher, Sharon; Wiltschko, David V. (1989). "Alleghanian orogen". In Hatcher, R. D. Jr.; Thomas, W. A.; Viele, G. W. (eds.). The Appalachian-Ouachita Orogen in the United States. pp. 233–318. doi:10.1130/DNAG-GNA-F2.233. ISBN 0-8137-5209-4.
- "Tectonic synthesis of the U.S. Appalachians by Robert D. Hatcher Jr.". The Appalachian-Ouachita Orogen in the United States. 1989. pp. 511–535. doi:10.1130/DNAG-GNA-F2.511. ISBN 0-8137-5209-4.
- Carrigan, Charles W.; Miller, Calvin F.; Fullagar, Paul D.; Bream, Brendan R.; Hatcher, Robert D. Jr.; Coath, Christopher D. (2003). "Ion microprobe age and geochemistry of southern appalachian basement, with implications for Proterozoic and Paleozoic reconstructions". Precambrian Research. 120 (1–2): 1. Bibcode:2003PreR..120....1C. doi:10.1016/S0301-9268(02)00113-4.
- Carrigan, Charles W.; Miller, Calvin F.; Fullagar, Paul D.; Bream, Brendan R.; Hatcher Jr., Robert D.; Coath, Christopher D. (2003). "Ion microprobe age and geochemistry of southern appalachian basement, with implications for Proterozoic and Paleozoic reconstructions". Precambrian Research. 120 (1–2): 1–36. Bibcode:2003PreR..120....1C. doi:10.1016/S0301-9268(02)00113-4.
- Bream, Brendan R.; Hatcher Jr., Robert D.; Miller, Calvin F.; Fullagar, Paul D. (January 2004). ""Detrital zircon ages and Nd isotopic data from the southern Appalachian crystalline core, Georgia, South Carolina, North Carolina, and Tennessee: New provenance constraints for part of the Laurentian margin"". In Tollo, R. P.; McLelland, J.; Corriveau, L.; Bartholomew, M. J. (eds.). Proterozoic Tectonic Evolution of the Grenville Orogen in North America. Geological Society of America. pp. 459–476. ISBN 978-0-8137-1197-3.
- Montes, Camilo; Hatcher, Robert D.; Restrepo-Pace, Pedro A. (2005). "Tectonic reconstruction of the northern Andean blocks: Oblique convergence and rotations derived from the kinematics of the Piedras–Girardot area, Colombia". Tectonophysics. 399 (1–4): 221–250. Bibcode:2005Tectp.399..221M. doi:10.1016/j.tecto.2004.12.024.
- Montes, Camilo; Hatcher, Robert D.; Restrepo-Pace, Pedro A. (2005). "Tectonic reconstruction of the northern Andean blocks: Oblique convergence and rotations derived from the kinematics of the Piedras–Girardot area, Colombia". Tectonophysics. 399 (1–4): 221–250. Bibcode:2005Tectp.399..221M. doi:10.1016/j.tecto.2004.12.024.
- Hatcher, Robert D.; Bream, Brendan R.; Merschat, Arthur J. (2007). "Tectonic map of the southern and central Appalachians: A tale of three orogens and a complete Wilson cycle". In Hatcher, Robert D. Jr.; Carlson, Marvin P.; McBride, John H.; Martínez Catalan, José R. (eds.). 4-D Framework of Continental Crust. doi:10.1130/2007.1200(29). ISBN 978-0-8137-1200-0.
- Hatcher, R. D. Jr., Richard P. (2010). "The Appalachian orogen: A brief summary". In Tollo, R. P.; Bartholomew, M. J.; Hibbard, J. P.; Karabinos, P. M. (eds.). From Rodinia to Pangea: The Lithotectonic Record of the Appalachian Region. Geological Society of America Memoir, 206. Geological Society of America. pp. 1–19. ISBN 978-0-8137-1206-2.
- Fisher, C. M.; Loewy, S. L.; Miller, C. F.; Berquist, P.; Van Schmus, W. R.; Hatcher, R. D.; Wooden, J. L.; Fullagar, P. D. (2010). "Whole-rock Pb and Sm-Nd isotopic constraints on the growth of southeastern Laurentia during Grenvillian orogenesis". Geological Society of America Bulletin. 122 (9–10): 1646–1659. Bibcode:2010GSAB..122.1646F. doi:10.1130/B30116.1.

=== Books ===
- Cazeau, C. J.; Hatcher, R. D. Jr.; Siemankowski, F. T. (1976). Physical Geology: Principles, Processes and Problems. Harper & Row. ISBN 0060412097. LCCN 75025962; x+518 pages; an introductory text primarily for undergraduates not majoring in geology
- Hatcher, R. D. Jr.; Williams, Harold; Zietz, Isidore, eds. (1983). Contributions to the Tectonics and Geophysics of Mountain Chains. ISBN 0813711584. LCCN 83005670; iv+223 pages; volume originated from Geological Society of America Penrose Conference held in Helen, Georgia, in May 1980
- Hatcher, R. D. Jr.; Bailey, Christopher M. (2019). Structural Geology: Principles, Concepts and Problems (3rd ed.). Oxford University Press. ISBN 9780190601928. LCCN 2018059976; xxi+634 pages; earlier editions by Hatcher alone
  - 1990 1st edition. Merrill Publishing Company. 1990. ISBN 067520626X. LCCN 89062573; xii+531 pages
  - 1995 2nd edition. Prentice Hall. 1995. ISBN 0023557133. LCCN 94002606; xvi+525 pages
- Hatcher, R. D. Jr.; Thomas, W. A., eds. (1990). Centennial Articles from Volume 100 of the GSA Bulletin. Geological Society of America Special Paper 253. ISBN 0813722535. LCCN 90034478; v+463 pages
- Hatcher, R. D. Jr.; Thomas, W. A.; Viele, G. W. (1990). The U. S. Appalachian and Ouachita Orogens. The geology of North America, volume F-2. Geological Society of America. ISBN 0813752094. LCCN 89023732.
- Martinez Catalán, J. R.; Hatcher, R. D. Jr.; Arenas, R.; Díaz García, F., eds. (2002). Variscan-Appalachian dynamics: The building of the late Paleozoic basement. Geological Society of America Special Paper 364. pp. v+305 pages. book description, GSA Online Store; table of contents with abstracts for chapters (geoscienceworld.org
- Hatcher, R. D. Jr.; Carlson, M. P.; McBride, J.H.; Martínez Catalán, J. R., eds. (2007). 4–D Framework of Continental Crust. Memoir 200. Geological Society of America. ISBN 9780813712000. LCCN 2007020532; vii+641 pages
- Engel, Annette Summers; Hatcher, Robert D. Jr., eds. (2018). Geology at every scale: field excursions for the 2018 GSA Southeastern Section Meeting in Knoxville, Tennessee. Boulder, Colorado: Geological Society of America. doi:10.1130/2018.0050(00). LCCN 2018012902.
