= Indian Lake Local School District =

School district in Ohio

Coordinates: 40°29′9″N 83°55′21″W

Indian Lake Local School District also known as "Indian Lake Local Schools" is a school district comprising the northwestern part of Logan County, Ohio. The president of the board of education is Tracy McPherson, and the superintendent is Dr. William McGlothlin.
