= Bellefontaine High School =

Location
- 555 E. Lake Ave. Bellefontaine, (Logan County), Ohio 43311; United States; 40°20′53″N 83°45′14″W

Information
- Type: Public high school.
- School district: Bellefontaine City Schools
- Superintendent: Brad Hall
- Principal: Jason Brown
- Grades: 9-12
- Enrollment: 655 (2023-2024)
- Colors: Black and Red
- Athletics conference: Central Buckeye Conference
- Mascot: Chieftain
- Team name: Bellefontaine Chieftains
- Athletic Director: Matt Comstock
- Website: https://bhs.bcs-k12.org/

Bellefontaine High School is a public high school in Bellefontaine, Ohio, United States. It is part of the Bellefontaine City Schools district. They are members of the Central Buckeye Conference and were formerly members of the Western Buckeye League.

== Notable alumni ==
- Homer W. Kiefer – US Army major general
- Austin Eldon Knowlton - architect and businessman
- Don Otten - former NBA player
- Mac Otten - former NBA player
- Tavien St. Clair - college football quarterback for the Ohio State Buckeyes
