= Hog Creek (Ottawa River tributary) =

Stream in Ohio, United States

Coordinates: 40°46′15″N 83°57′21″W

Hog Creek is a stream in the U.S. state of Ohio. The stream runs 14.2 miles (22.9 km) before it empties into the Ottawa River.

The river's name comes from the Native Americans of the area, who saw many wild hogs near its course.
