= Graham High School (St. Paris, Ohio) =

Location
- 7800 West State Route 36; St. Paris, Ohio 43072; United States; 40°7′19″N 83°54′32″W

Information
- Type: Public secondary school
- Established: 1957
- School district: Graham Local School District
- Superintendent: Chad Lensman
- Principal: Bill Overla
- Teaching staff: 18.00 (FTE)
- Grades: 9-12
- Enrollment: 491 (2024–2025)
- Student to teacher ratio: 27.28
- Colors: Black and white
- Athletics conference: Central Buckeye Conference
- Nickname: Falcons
- Website: www.grahamlocalschools.org/o/ghs

Graham High School is a public high school in St. Paris, Ohio. It is the only high school in the Graham Local School District.

== History ==
Graham High School was constructed in 1957, the same year that Graham Local School District was formed. There have been several major renovations to the school, including the addition of a science wing, updated offices, and a new football stadium. A $13 million renovation took place in June 2009.

== Athletics ==
Sports at Graham include: football, boys' and girls' basketball, baseball, softball, wrestling, track & field, cross country, girls' volleyball, boys' and girls' golf, and boys' and girls' soccer. Graham High School is Division III in football, while all other sports are Division II. Graham's colors are black and white and Freddie Falcon is their mascot. Graham's major rivals are the Hillclimbers of the neighboring town of Urbana, Ohio. Graham is a member of Central Buckeye Conference (CBC). The conference is divided into two divisions: The Kenton Trail Division, which includes Bellefontaine, Jonathan Alder, Kenton Ridge, London, Urbana, and Tecumseh. The Mad River Division includes Benjamin Logan, Graham, Indian Lake, North Union, Northwestern, and Shawnee.

== Ohio High School Athletic Association State Championships ==
- Boys Baseball: 1930, 1973
- Boys Wrestling State Tournament Team: 1982, 1998, 2001, 2002, 2003, 2004, 2005, 2006, 2007, 2008, 2009, 2010, 2011, 2012, 2013, 2014, 2015, 2016, 2017, 2018, 2019, 2021, 2022, 2023, 2024, 2025
- Boys Wrestling Dual Meet Team: 2013, 2014, 2015, 2016, 2017, 2018, 2019

== Notable alumni ==
- Drew Daniel – winner of the American reality TV show Big Brother 5
- Jim Jordan – former folkstyle and freestyle wrestler, two-time NCAA champion, member of the U.S. House of Representatives from Ohio's 4th district
- Dustin Schlatter – former folkstyle and freestyle wrestler, NCAA champion, 2009 USA World Team member
- David Taylor – former folkstyle and freestyle wrestler, two-time NCAA champion, three-time World Champion and 2020 Olympic gold medalist, head wrestling coach at Oklahoma State
