= National Register of Historic Places listings in Miami County, Ohio =

Location of Miami County in Ohio

This is a list of the National Register of Historic Places listings in Miami County, Ohio.

This is intended to be a complete list of the properties and districts on the National Register of Historic Places in Miami County, Ohio, United States. The locations of National Register properties and districts for which the latitude and longitude coordinates are included below, may be seen in an online map.

There are 47 properties and districts listed on the National Register in the county, including one National Historic Landmark.

This National Park Service list is complete through NPS recent listings posted June 26, 2026.

== Current listings ==
	Name on the Register	Image	Date listed	Location	City or town	Description
1	African Jackson Cemetery	African Jackson Cemetery	December 16, 1982 (#82001475)	North of Piqua on Zimmerlin Rd. 40°09′25″N 84°14′07″W	Springcreek Township	
2	Arrowston	Arrowston	February 8, 1980 (#80003162)	1220 Park Ave. 40°09′14″N 84°15′34″W	Piqua	
3	William Baumgardner House and Farm Buildings	William Baumgardner House and Farm Buildings	February 17, 1978 (#78002141)	8390 National Rd., southwest of New Carlisle; 39°54′22″N 84°03′35″W	Bethel Township	
4	Bradford Junction Interlocking Tower	Bradford Junction Interlocking Tower	April 20, 1995 (#95000497)	501 E. Main St. 40°07′52″N 84°25′29″W	Bradford	
5	Casstown Lutheran Stone Church	Casstown Lutheran Stone Church	May 31, 1984 (#84003783)	11 S. Main St. 40°03′05″N 84°07′46″W	Casstown	
6	Covington Historic Government Building	Covington Historic Government Building	June 22, 1981 (#81000447)	Spring and Pearl Sts. 40°06′59″N 84°21′12″W	Covington	
7	Robert Culbertson House	Robert Culbertson House	October 10, 1975 (#75001489)	304 E. Franklin St. 40°02′13″N 84°12′05″W	Troy	
8	Curtis & Reed Carriage Works		March 23, 2025 (#100012850)	125 West Water Street; 40°08′51″N 84°14′27″W	Piqua	
9	Detrick Milling and Distilling Company	Detrick Milling and Distilling Company	April 15, 2010 (#10000193)	128 W. Broadway; 39°57′33″N 84°10′25″W	Tipp City	
10	William K. Dunlap House	William K. Dunlap House	December 12, 1976 (#76001492)	16 E. Franklin St. 40°02′17″N 84°12′13″W	Troy	
11	John Minor Dye Stone House	John Minor Dye Stone House	July 7, 1983 (#83002008)	9 S. Children's Home Rd., east of Troy; 40°01′49″N 84°08′06″W	Elizabeth Township	
12	Eldean Covered Bridge	Eldean Covered Bridge	February 20, 1975 (#75001492)	North of Troy across the Great Miami River on County Road 33; 40°04′40″N 84°13′00″W	Concord and Staunton Townships	
13	Elizabeth Township Rural Historic District	Elizabeth Township Rural Historic District	March 1, 1997 (#97000160)	Roughly bounded by Lost Creek, the Miami and Clark County line, and Casstown Clark County and Elizabeth Bethel Rds. 40°00′45″N 84°05′53″W	Elizabeth Township	
14	First Presbyterian Church	First Presbyterian Church	December 12, 1976 (#76001493)	Franklin and Walnut Sts. 40°02′17″N 84°12′11″W	Troy	
15	Fort Piqua Hotel	Fort Piqua Hotel	February 15, 1974 (#74001576)	114 W. Main St. 40°08′56″N 84°14′24″W	Piqua	
16	Mary Jane Hayner House	Mary Jane Hayner House	January 30, 1976 (#76001494)	301 W. Main St. 40°02′26″N 84°12′22″W	Troy	
17	Hobart Circle Historic District	Hobart Circle Historic District	May 25, 1989 (#89000419)	2-9 Hobart Cir. and 11 and 23 Hobart Dr. 40°02′31″N 84°12′35″W	Troy	
18	E.A. Hobart House	E.A. Hobart House	May 25, 1989 (#89000420)	172 S. Ridge Ave. 40°02′35″N 84°13′12″W	Troy	
19	William Hobart Vacation House	William Hobart Vacation House	May 25, 1989 (#89000421)	995 Polecat Rd., north of Troy; 40°04′55″N 84°11′06″W	Staunton Township	
20	House at 121 South Ridge	House at 121 South Ridge	May 25, 1989 (#89000425)	121 S. Ridge Ave. 40°02′41″N 84°13′03″W	Troy	
21	House at 129 South Ridge	House at 129 South Ridge	May 25, 1989 (#89000423)	129 S. Ridge Ave. 40°02′39″N 84°13′03″W	Troy	
22	House at 145 South Ridge	House at 145 South Ridge	May 25, 1989 (#89000426)	145 S. Ridge Ave. 40°02′37″N 84°13′03″W	Troy	
23	House at 203 Penn Road	House at 203 Penn Road	May 25, 1989 (#89000422)	203 Penn Rd. 40°02′33″N 84°12′56″W	Troy	
24	House at 1022 West Main Street	House at 1022 West Main Street	May 25, 1989 (#89000424)	1022 W. Main St. 40°02′42″N 84°13′02″W	Troy	
25	Benjamin Iddings Log House	Benjamin Iddings Log House	November 21, 1976 (#76001497)	6.5 mi (10.5 km) west of Troy; 40°00′58″N 84°19′05″W	Newton Township	
26	Lockington Locks Historical Area	Lockington Locks Historical Area	December 17, 1969 (#69000147)	Miami and Erie Canal between Lockington and Washington Township; 40°11′22″N 84°14′31″W	Washington Township	Extends into Lockington and Washington Township in Shelby County
27	McKinley School	McKinley School	April 22, 2005 (#05000025)	240 S. Main St. 39°57′35″N 84°19′39″W	West Milton	
28	Miami County Courthouse and Power Station	Miami County Courthouse and Power Station	May 30, 1975 (#75001490)	Bounded by Main, Short, Plum, and Water Sts. 40°02′27″N 84°12′18″W	Troy	
29	Newberry Township School	Newberry Township School	July 3, 2012 (#12000395)	4045 State Route 721, south of Bradford; 40°05′40″N 84°25′46″W	Newberry Township	
30	Old Tippecanoe Main Street Historic District	Old Tippecanoe Main Street Historic District	July 7, 1983 (#83002009)	5-439 W. Main St. and 3-225 E. Main St. 39°57′40″N 84°10′02″W	Tipp City	
31	Overfield Tavern	Overfield Tavern	January 30, 1976 (#76001495)	201 E. Water St. 40°02′23″N 84°12′02″W	Troy	One of Ohio's oldest taverns, built in 1808. Now a museum.
32	Piqua High School	Piqua High School	August 22, 1996 (#96000927)	316 N. College St. 40°08′56″N 84°14′57″W	Piqua	Built in 1914, converted to 78 senior housing units in 1995
33	Piqua Historical Area State Memorial	Piqua Historical Area State Memorial	April 7, 1971 (#71000646)	State Route 66, 1 mi (1.6 km) north of Piqua; 40°10′45″N 84°15′21″W	Washington Township	
34	Piqua-Caldwell Historic District	Piqua-Caldwell Historic District	January 11, 1985 (#85000069)	N. Main, Wayne, Downing, Caldwell Sts; W. Ash to Camp Sts. 40°08′59″N 84°14′22″W	Piqua	
35	Plainview Farm	Plainview Farm	April 18, 1985 (#85000857)	535-545 Weddle Rd., southeast of Casstown; 40°02′08″N 84°05′30″W	Elizabeth Township	
36	Pleasant Hill United Church of Christ	Pleasant Hill United Church of Christ	August 22, 2002 (#02000881)	10 W. Monument St. 40°03′07″N 84°20′43″W	Pleasant Hill	
37	York Rial House	York Rial House	August 12, 1986 (#86002620)	McFarland St., north of Piqua; 40°09′23″N 84°14′12″W	Springcreek Township	
38	Elizabeth Sheets Saunders Farm	Elizabeth Sheets Saunders Farm	November 21, 1976 (#76001491)	4525 McCandless Rd., southeast of Casstown; 40°02′16″N 84°07′18″W	Elizabeth Township	
39	Saunders Seed Company	Saunders Seed Company	April 13, 2010 (#10000194)	101 W. Broadway; 39°57′34″N 84°10′23″W	Tipp City	
40	Andrew Sheets House	Andrew Sheets House	February 1, 1988 (#87002522)	6880 LaFevre Rd. 40°01′34″N 84°04′36″W	Elizabeth Township	
41	Staley Farm	Staley Farm	March 24, 1980 (#80003161)	North of Brandt at 7095 Staley Rd. 39°58′01″N 84°04′42″W	Bethel Township	
42	Troy Country Club		June 30, 2026 (#100013172)	1830 Peters Rd. 40°00′59″N 84°13′30″W	Troy	
43	Troy Public Square	Troy Public Square	June 30, 1975 (#75001491)	Property surrounding the junction of Main and Market Sts. 40°02′22″N 84°12′12″W	Troy	
44	Twin Arch Stone Culvert	Twin Arch Stone Culvert	July 17, 1978 (#78002142)	North of Troy at County Road 25A; 40°05′18″N 84°13′24″W	Concord Township	
45	Callahill and Priscilla Weddle House	Callahill and Priscilla Weddle House	June 18, 1987 (#87000986)	5710 LeFevre Rd., east of Troy; 40°01′32″N 84°05′59″W	Elizabeth Township	
46	Judge Henry Williams House	Judge Henry Williams House	January 1, 1976 (#76001496)	16 S. Cherry St. 40°02′22″N 84°12′17″W	Troy	
47	S. Zollinger Company Building	S. Zollinger Company Building	December 15, 2015 (#15000903)	101 S. Wayne St. 40°08′47″N 84°14′26″W	Piqua	

== See also ==
- List of National Historic Landmarks in Ohio
- Listings in neighboring counties: Champaign, Clark, Darke, Montgomery, Shelby
- National Register of Historic Places listings in Ohio
