= Walter H. Albaugh =

American politician (1890–1942)

- 1922 or 1923

Member of the U.S. House of Representatives from Ohio's 4th district
- In office November 8, 1938 – January 3, 1939
- Preceded by: Frank L. Kloeb
- Succeeded by: Robert Franklin Jones

Personal details
- Born: Walter Hugh Albaugh; January 2, 1890 Phoneton, Ohio, U.S.
- Died: January 21, 1942 (aged 52) Troy, Ohio, U.S.
- Resting place: Memorial Park Cemetery; Dayton, Ohio
- Party: Republican
- Spouse: Grace Grove (m. 1923)
- Education: Ohio States University College of Law
- Occupation: Politician; lawyer

Walter Hugh Albaugh (January 2, 1890 – January 21, 1942) was an American lawyer and politician who served two months as a U.S. representative from Ohio in 1938 and 1939.

== Early life ==
Walter Hugh Albaugh was born on January 2, 1890, in Phoneton, Ohio, to Frances (née Anderson) and Clifford Lincoln Albaugh. His father was a bank president and nurseryman. Albaugh attended both the public and high schools in Bethel Township. He worked as a civil engineer where he surveyed fuel lands in Ohio and West Virginia from 1910 until 1911. He went on to graduate from the law department of Ohio State University in Columbus, Ohio, in 1914, and was admitted to the bar the same year.

== Career ==
After graduating, Albaugh practiced law in Troy, Ohio. During World War I, he served in the United States Infantry as a private, unassigned, from May 28, 1918, until December 13, 1918.

After the war, Albaugh served as a member of the Ohio House of Representatives from 1921 until 1925. He was elected as a Republican to the Seventy-fifth Congress to fill the vacancy caused by the resignation of Frank L. Kloeb, and only served from November 8, 1938, until January 3, 1939. He was not a candidate for nomination in 1938 to the next full term.

Albaugh subsequently resumed the practice of law in Troy. He was active in the American Red Cross and served as secretary of the county executive committee in Miami County.

== Personal life ==
Albaugh married Grace Grove of Dayton on January 2, 1923. He was a member of the First Presbyterian Church in Troy.

Albaugh died following a stroke at his home in Troy on January 21, 1942, and is interred in Memorial Park Cemetery, Dayton, Ohio.

== Sources ==
U.S. House of Representatives
| Preceded by Frank Le Blond Kloeb | United States Representative from Ohio's 4th congressional district 1938-1939 | Succeeded by Robert Franklin Jones |
| Preceded by L. A. Pearson | Representative from Miami County; 1921-1924 | Succeeded by S. A. Blessing |
