= Elizabeth Township, Ohio =

Elizabeth Township, Ohio may refer to one of the following places in Ohio:

- Elizabeth Township, Lawrence County, Ohio
- Elizabeth Township, Miami County, Ohio

== See also ==
- Elizabeth Township (disambiguation)
