= List of the oldest buildings in Ohio =

This article lists the oldest extant buildings in Ohio, including extant buildings and structures constructed prior to and during the United States rule over Ohio. Only buildings built prior to 1830 are suitable for inclusion on this list, or the building must be the oldest of its type.

In order to qualify for the list, a structure must:

- be a recognizable building (defined as any human-made structure used or intended for supporting or sheltering any use or continuous occupancy);
- incorporate features of building work from the claimed date to at least 1.5 metres (4.9 ft) in height and/or be a listed building.

This consciously excludes ruins of limited height, roads and statues. Bridges may be included if they otherwise fulfill the above criteria. Dates for many of the oldest structures have been arrived at by radiocarbon dating or dendrochronology and should be considered approximate. If the exact year of initial construction is estimated, it will be shown as a range of dates.

== List of oldest buildings ==
Building	Image	Location	First built	Use	Notes
Old Stone Fort (Cushocton, Ohio)		Coshocton, Ohio	ca. 1679-1700s	Unknown	Believed to have been built by "d’ Iberville, LaSalle’s successor who built French forts in the Mississippi Valley from 1679- 1689. It’s also believed that this French Canadian built the fort to guard against the English in the battle of the fur trades." Another theory is "it was actually built in the 1700s by Irishman George Croghan as a fur trading post."
Rufus Putnam House		Marietta, Ohio	1788	Residential	Now part of the Campus Martius museum
Ohio Company Land Office building		Marietta, Ohio	1788	Business	Now part of the Campus Martius museum
Newcom Tavern		Dayton, Ohio	1796	Tavern	Oldest building in Dayton
Unionville Tavern		Unionville, Ohio	1798	Tavern	Abandoned tavern, one of oldest buildings in state
Galloway Log House		Xenia, Ohio	1799	Residence	largely rebuilt after 1974 tornado
Captain Jonathan Stone House		Belpre, Ohio	1799	Residence	
Federal Land Office (Steubenville, Ohio)		Steubenville, Ohio	1801	Government	Established by Harrison Land Act of 1800
Ohio's Oldest Brick Building		Lisbon, Ohio	1803	Commercial	Often alleged to be Ohio's oldest brick building; built by Picking family, Edwin Stanton practiced law upstairs in building.
Betts House (Cincinnati, Ohio)		Cincinnati, Ohio	1804	Residential	Oldest building in Cincinnati
Benjamin Iddings Log House		Miami County, Ohio	1804	Residential	Oldest building in Miami County
Old Stone Tavern (Poland, Ohio)		Poland, Ohio	1804	Tavern	Oldest remaining building in Poland. William McKinley enlisted in the Union Army on its front porch in 1861.
Franklinton Post Office		Columbus, Ohio	1807	Post office	Oldest building in Columbus
Overfield Tavern		Troy, Ohio	1808	Tavern	Oldest building in Troy
West Union Presbyterian Church		West Union, Ohio	1810	Church	Oldest active church building in Ohio
Dunham Tavern		Cleveland, Ohio	1824	Tavern	Oldest building in Cleveland
Petersburg Mill		Petersburg, Carroll County, Ohio	1826	Water mill	Built in 1826 to replace an 1818 watermill.

== See also ==
- National Register of Historic Places listings in Ohio
- History of Ohio
- Oldest buildings in the United States
