= Pleasant Hill United Church of Christ =

- U.S. National Register of Historic Places
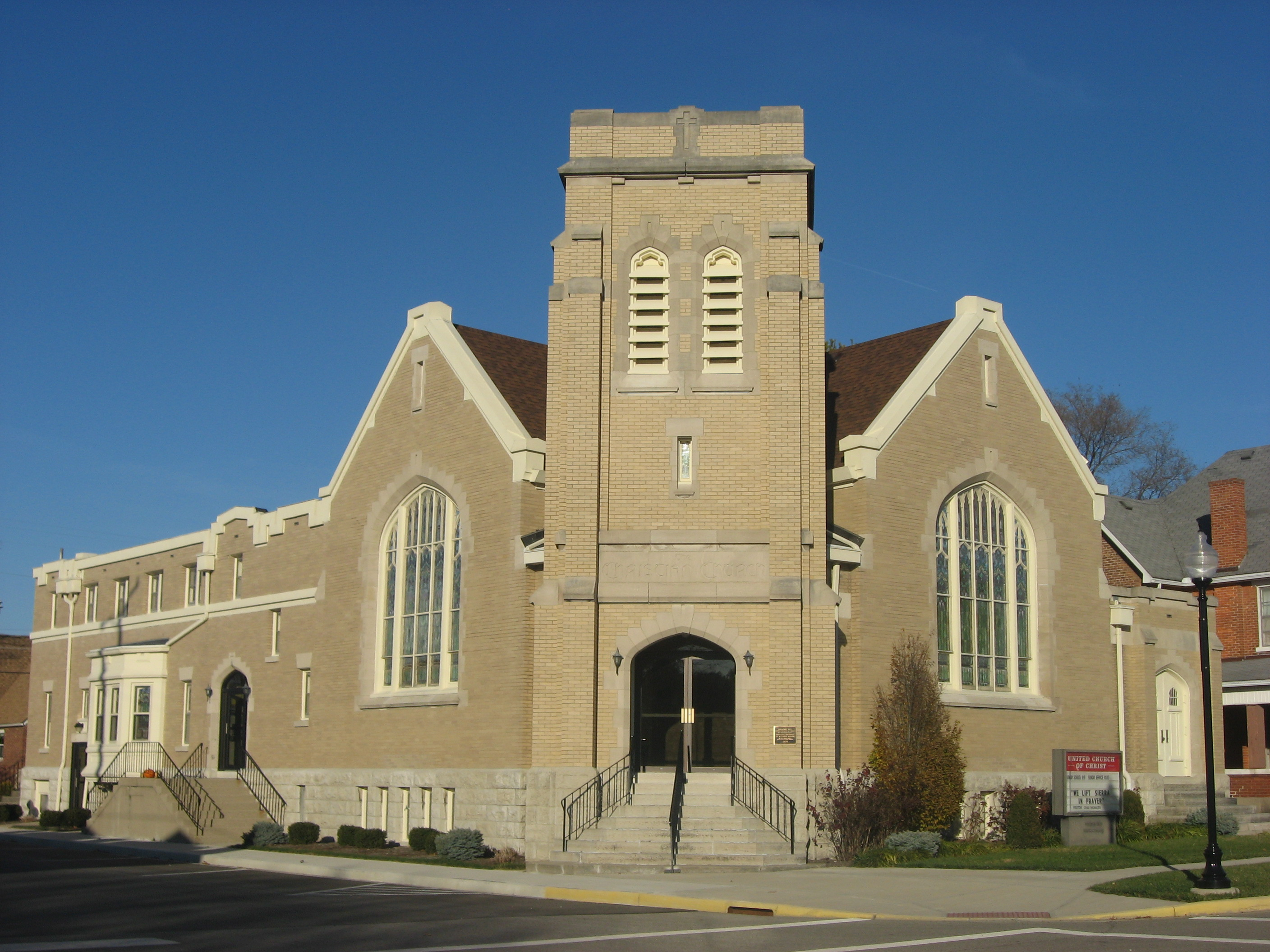
- Front and western side of the church

- Location within Ohio Location within the United States
- Location: 10 W. Monument St., Pleasant Hill, Ohio
- Coordinates: 40°3′7″N 84°20′43″W
- Area: 0.2 acres (0.081 ha)
- Built: 1911
- Architect: Schenck & Williams
- Architectural style: Gothic Revival, Akron Plan
- NRHP reference No.: 02000881
- Added to NRHP: August 22, 2002

The Pleasant Hill United Church of Christ is a historic church in the village of Pleasant Hill in the western part of the U.S. state of Ohio. Built in the early twentieth century, it was the fourth building used as the home of one of the area's oldest congregations, and it has been named a historic site.

Founded in 1843, Pleasant Hill was originally called "Newton" in honor of Isaac Newton, after whom the surrounding township was also named. By the time it was incorporated in 1866 it had changed its name to "Pleasant Hill"; the establishment of a post office in the community led locals to wonder if their mail would be misaddressed, so a new name was chosen. The area's first residents were Quakers; they organized in 1813 and built their first church building in 1820. A Christian Connexion-affiliated group founded a church two years after the Quakers; it was called "Hopewell" following a naming discussion at the original meeting, in which one of the charter members said she "hoped the church might do well". The earliest structure, a log building, was built in 1820 out of town, and it was later removed and replaced by a frame structure on the same site. It in turn was replaced by a brick building in Pleasant Hill; according to a congregation historian, this change was the result of an 1868 storm that virtually destroyed the old building. Following the service of 10 April 1910, it was taken down to allow the construction of another building on the same site. In the 20th century the congregation became a part of the United Church of Christ, within which it remains.

The church is a Gothic Revival structure built with an Akron Plan interior. The structure relies on limestone for its foundation and walls, with a roof of ceramic tile and occasional elements of wood. Located on a corner lot, the building features a tower on the corner facing the intersection; worshippers can enter by climbing a small flight of stairs to the base of the tower. Large gabled sections with fat ogee-arched windows face both streets, with a functional addition to the rear.

In late 2002 the Pleasant Hill UCC was listed on the National Register of Historic Places. One of more than forty such locations in Miami County and the only one in the village of Pleasant Hill, it qualified for listing because of its historically significant architecture.
