= Eldean Covered Bridge =

- U.S. National Register of Historic Places
- U.S. National Historic Landmark
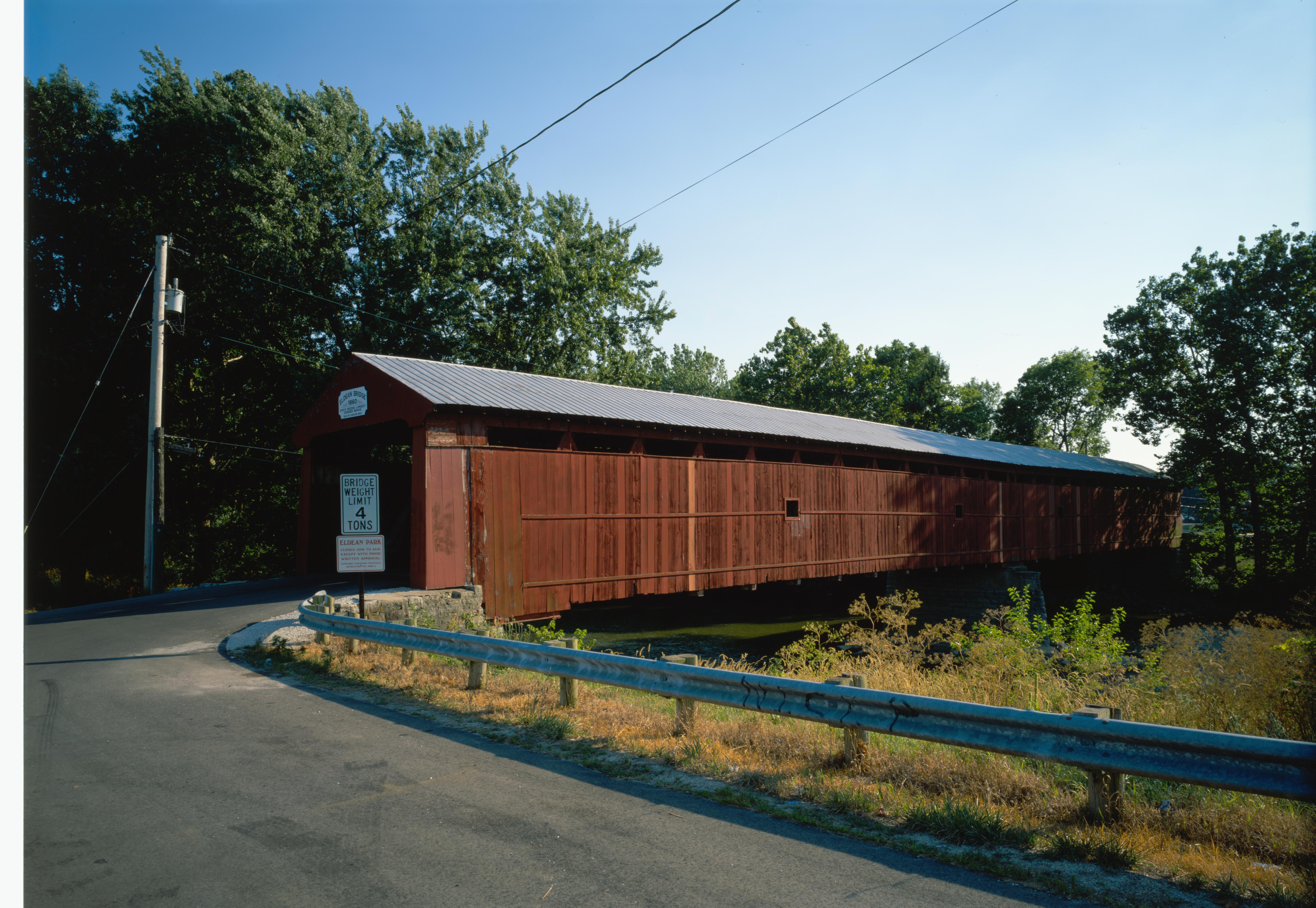
- 2002 HAER photo

- Location within Ohio Location within the United States
- Location: Eldean Road over the Great Miami River
- Nearest city: Troy, Ohio
- Coordinates: 40°4′40″N 84°13′0″W
- Area: less than one acre
- Built: 1860
- Architectural style: Long truss
- NRHP reference No.: 75001492

Significant dates
- Added to NRHP: February 20, 1975
- Designated NHL: December 23, 2016

The Eldean Covered Bridge is a historic covered bridge spanning the Great Miami River in Miami County, Ohio north of Troy. Built in 1860, it is one of the nation's finest surviving examples of a Long truss, patented in 1830 by engineer Stephen H. Long. At 224 feet (68 m) in length for its two spans, it is the longest surviving example of its type. It was listed on the National Register of Historic Places in 1975, and was designated a National Historic Landmark in 2016.

== Description and history ==
The Eldean Covered Bridge is located north of the city of Troy, spanning the Great Miami River between Concord Township and Staunton Township on a now-bypassed segment of County Road 33. It is a two-span structure, mounted on cut stone abutments and a central pier. The western abutment and central pier have been capped in concrete, and the pier has a cutwater feature on its northern (upstream) side. The total structure length is 231 feet (70 m), with each span about 108 feet (33 m) and 21 feet (6.4 m) wide. The roadway has a width of 17 feet (5.2 m) and a maximum clearance of 13 feet (4.0 m). The bridge has a gabled metal roof, vertical board sheathing on the outside, and small square apertures framed in each side for light.

County Road 33 was laid out in 1847, providing access to a hamlet originally serving the Miami and Erie Canal to the east. The present bridge was built in 1860, and is the second to stand on the site. The bridge trusses were built to a patented design by engineer Stephen H. Long. The Long truss was the first truss structure to be designed using engineering principles, and it introduced the idea of prestressed elements which are used to counteract active load on the structure. This bridge is one of the finest and least-altered examples of this truss type. With the demise of the Old Blenheim Bridge in New York, it is also the longest example of the type. On December 23, 2016, the Eldean Covered Bridge was designated a National Historic Landmark.

== See also ==
- List of bridges documented by the Historic American Engineering Record in Ohio
- List of covered bridges in Ohio
- List of National Historic Landmarks in Ohio
