= Arrowston =

Historic house in Ohio, United States

- U.S. National Register of Historic Places
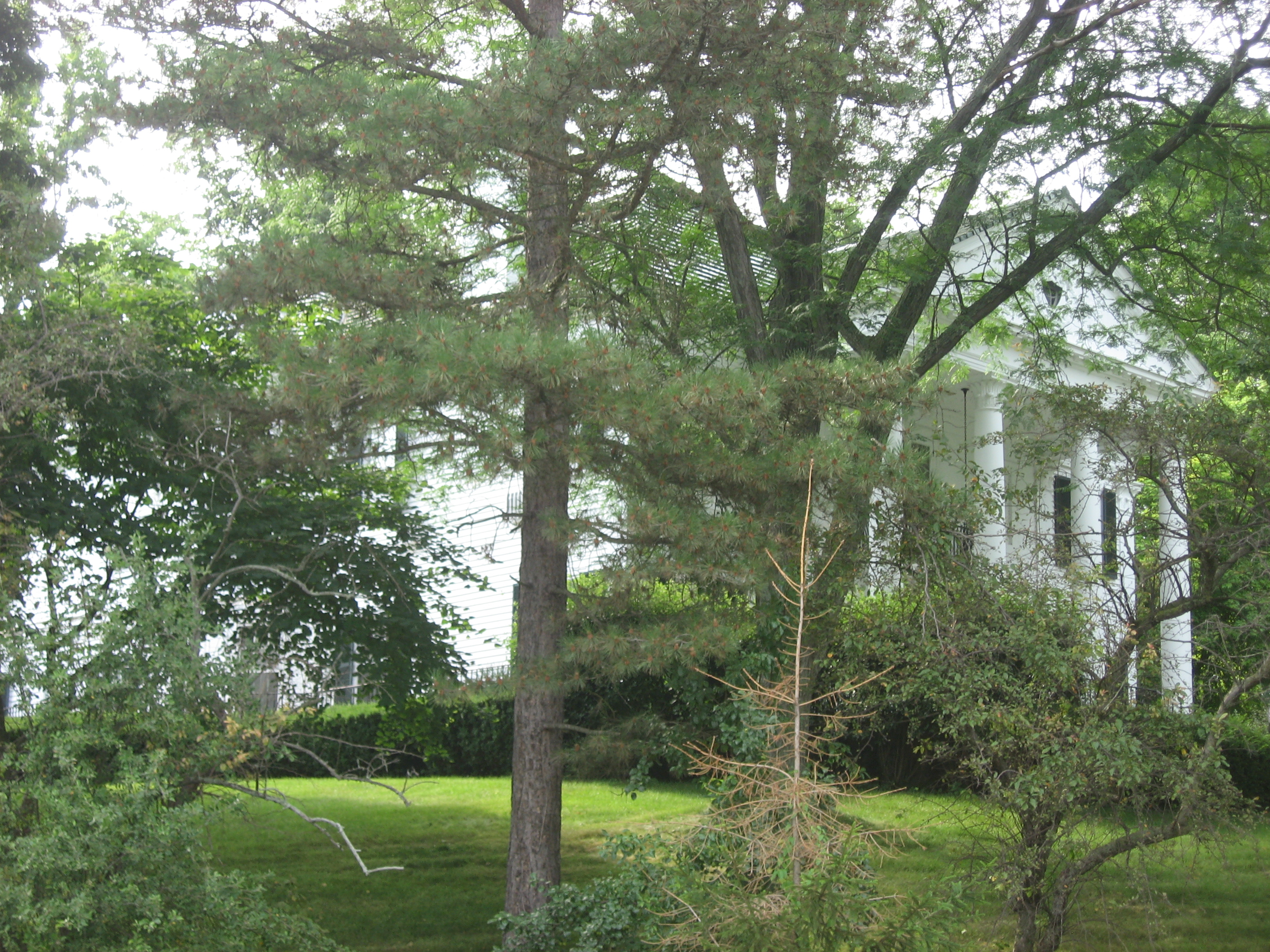
- Front and side of the house

- Location within Ohio Location within the United States
- Interactive map showing the location of Arrowston
- Location: 1220 Park Ave., Piqua, Ohio
- Coordinates: 40°9′15″N 84°15′33″W
- Area: 8 acres (3.2 ha)
- Built: 1887
- Architect: A.M. Fry; R. Gilmore Hanford
- Architectural style: Colonial Revival, Georgian Revival
- NRHP reference No.: 80003162
- Added to NRHP: February 8, 1980

Arrowston is a historic estate in the city of Piqua, Ohio, United States. Built at the end of the nineteenth century for a local industrialist, it has been named a historic site. It is currently a private residence.

As the president of the Favorite Stove and Range Company, William K. Boal headed Piqua's largest industrial employer during the Gilded Age and early twentieth century. He and his wife arranged for the construction of the house at Arrowston in 1887, but it was only home to them for about a decade: Mrs. Boal was deeply shaken by the death of one of their sons and no longer desired to live in their mansion, and they moved to a residence in central Piqua in 1898. Later owners expanded the property in 1929, creating a large estate around the house: the newly expanded property included the construction of a lake and canal, as well as extensive other landscape architecture. No major changes have been made to the landscaping since 1929.

Arrowston's main house is a three-story building in the Georgian Revival style of architecture. Numerous Neoclassical influences are obvious, ranging from grand themes to small details: the careful symmetry of the whole design, its size in comparison to its surroundings, and the hip roof are typical of the style, as are details such as its ornate cornice, the pilasters, and the conventional double-hung windows. Both weatherboarding and brick are employed in the walls, which rest on a stone foundation and support a tiled roof. Multiple dormers rise from the walls: the eaves at the bottom of the roof extend past the walls, which in some points are extended above the roof, causing the latter to appear notched. Numerous windows are equipped with shutters, while the roof is gabled. Large chimneys form the highest points of the house.

Today, Arrowston is surrounded by modern subdivisions, but its extensive landscaping distinguish it easily from the newer neighborhoods around it. Its design is significant to the point that it has been given federal historic site status, being listed on the National Register of Historic Places in early 1980 because of its architecture; besides the house, the designation embraces seven outbuildings and a pair of related structures. It is one of four National Register-listed locations in Piqua, along with the Fort Piqua Hotel, the Piqua High School, and the Piqua-Caldwell Historic District.
