= Benjamin Iddings Log House =

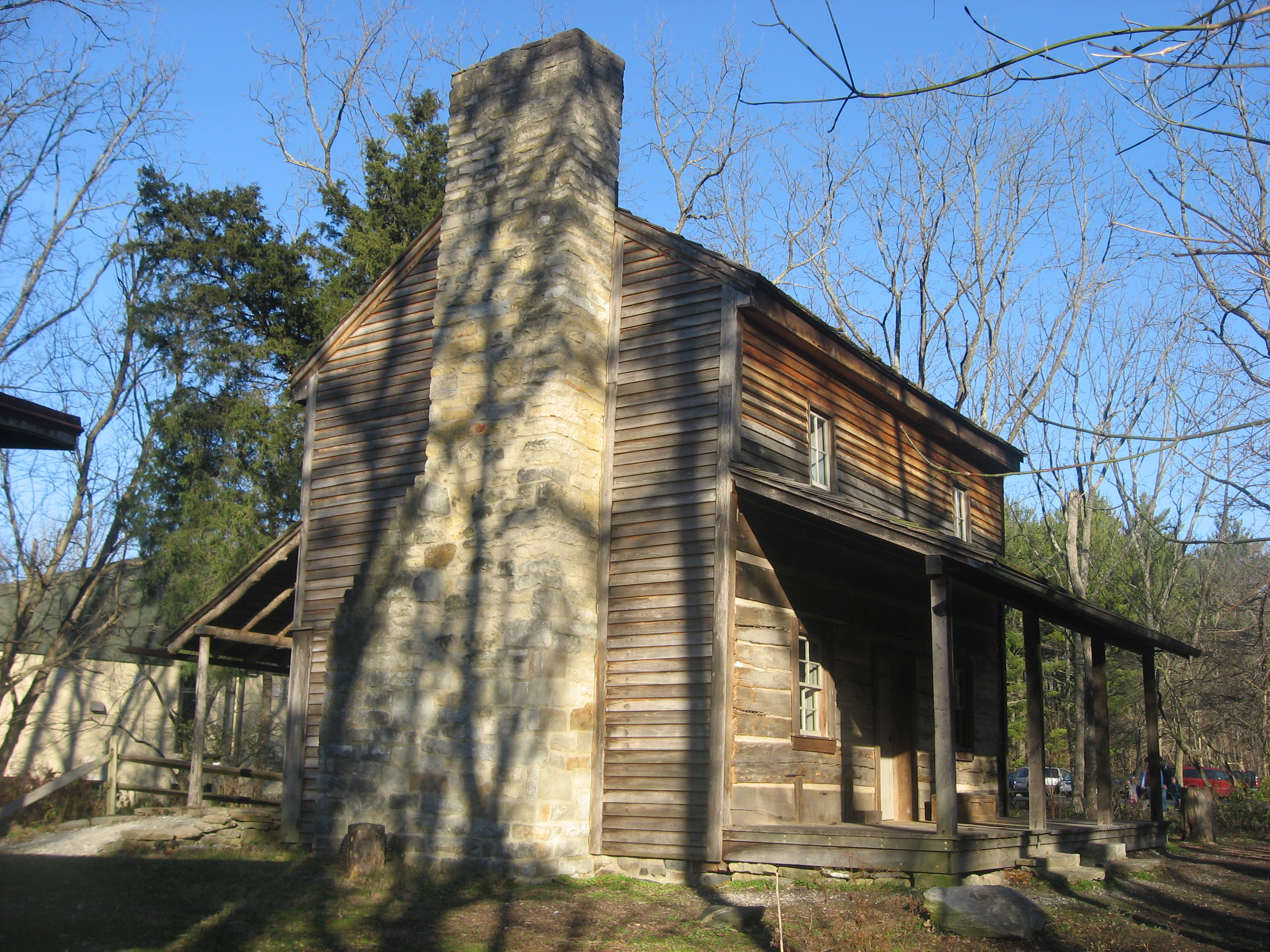
Benjamin Iddings Log House from southwest

The Benjamin and Phebe Iddings Log House is a two-story log dwelling built in 1804 in Miami County, Ohio. It is the oldest surviving building in the county and is located on the property of Brukner Nature Center. In 1976, the building was listed on the National Register of Historic Places. In 1981, the building underwent a major restoration.

== Architecture ==
The Benjamin and Phebe Iddings Log House is a two-story, square-hewn log structure with a side-gabled roof and half-dovetail notched corners. A half dovetail notch is a log construction technique in which notches on opposite logs have a single angled slope on one side of the log end. The building is unusual in that it has both a basement and an upstairs fireplace, neither of which are common in log houses on the Ohio frontier. It also has original paneling and beveled ceiling beams.

== History ==
=== The Iddings Family ===
Benjamin Iddings married Phebe Wilkinson in 1775 in Pennsylvania and together they had 10 children. The family were active members of the local Quaker community, joining the Bradford Monthly Meeting. In 1779, they relocated to Guilford County, North Carolina, where they joined the Deep River Monthly Meeting before moving to Surrey County, North Carolina, where they became members of the Westfield Monthly Meeting. In 1795, the family settled in Greene County, Tennessee near the Nolichucky River, helping to establish the New Hope Monthly Meeting. Benjamin served as both Elder and Recorder.

After the signing of the Treaty of Greeneville in 1795, Benjamin made an exploratory trip up the Stillwater River into what is now Miami County, Ohio;, wintering near Union, Ohio. in 1804, the Iddings family relocated to the area, purchasing 160 acres in Section 33 of what is now Newton Township. The Iddings actually built their log house on their neighbor's property, later paying $11.62 to acquire an additional four acres upon which the house had been constructed. The site on the east bank of the Stillwater River was likely selected because it was on high ground above the river and had a spring nearby.

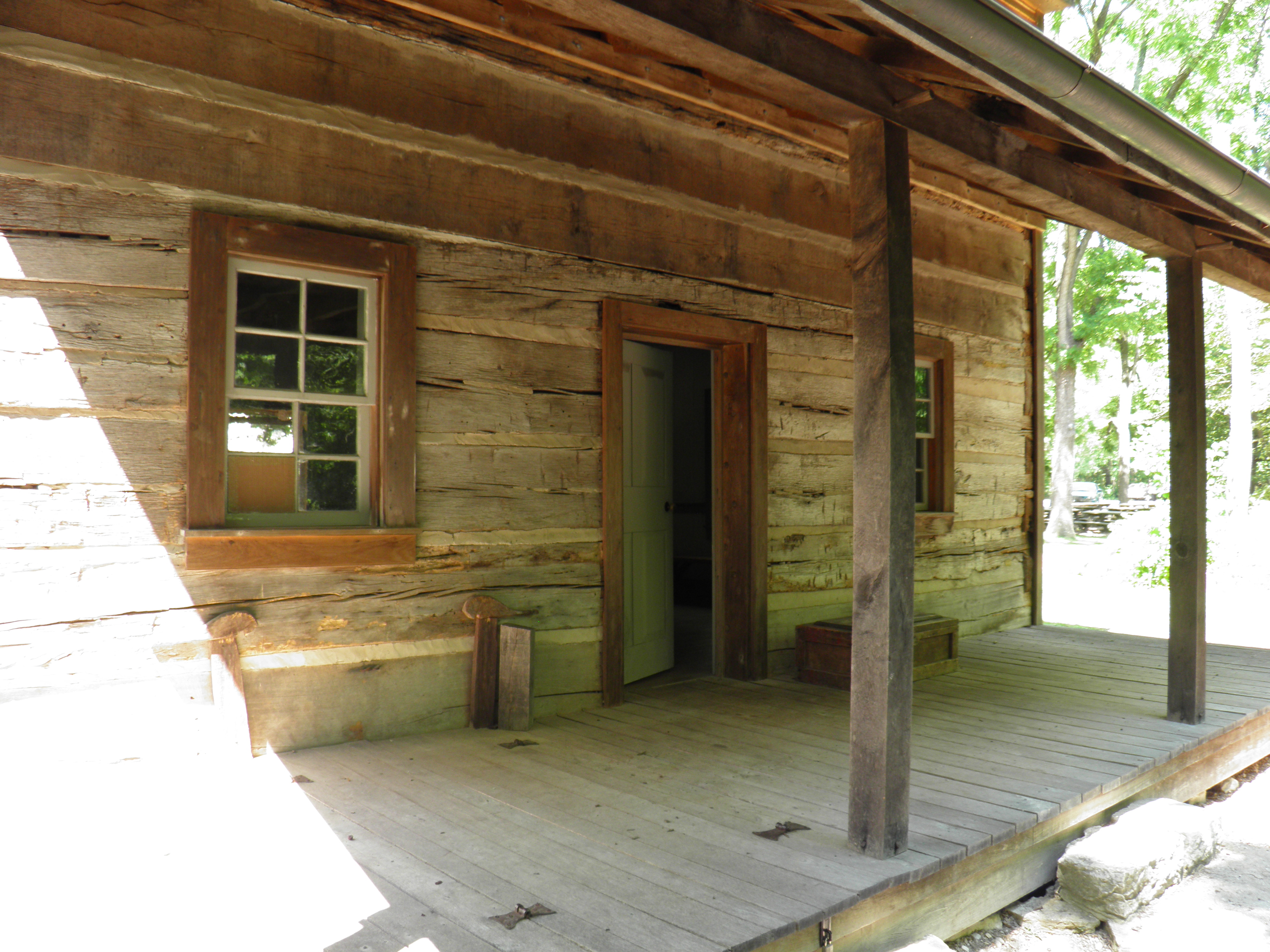
Iddings House4 Brukner Nature Center

The family were members of the West Branch Monthly Meeting in Union Township until 1813, when they joined the Union Monthly Meeting. In 1818, Phebe Iddings died and Benjamin married his widowed neighbor, Ruth Pierce, in 1822. Benjamin Iddings died four years later in 1826 and is buried in Old Union Cemetery on Horseshoe Bend Road.

=== Brukner Nature Center ===
In 1974, the log home became part of Brukner Nature Center. The surrounding nature preserve now includes 165 acres of diverse wildlife habitat, more than 6 miles of hiking trails, and a wildlife rehabilitation unit for injured and orphaned animals.

== See also ==
- Overfield Tavern
- Newcom Tavern
- Dewitt Log Homestead
