= S. Zollinger Company Building =

- Zollinger, S., Company Building
- U.S. National Register of Historic Places
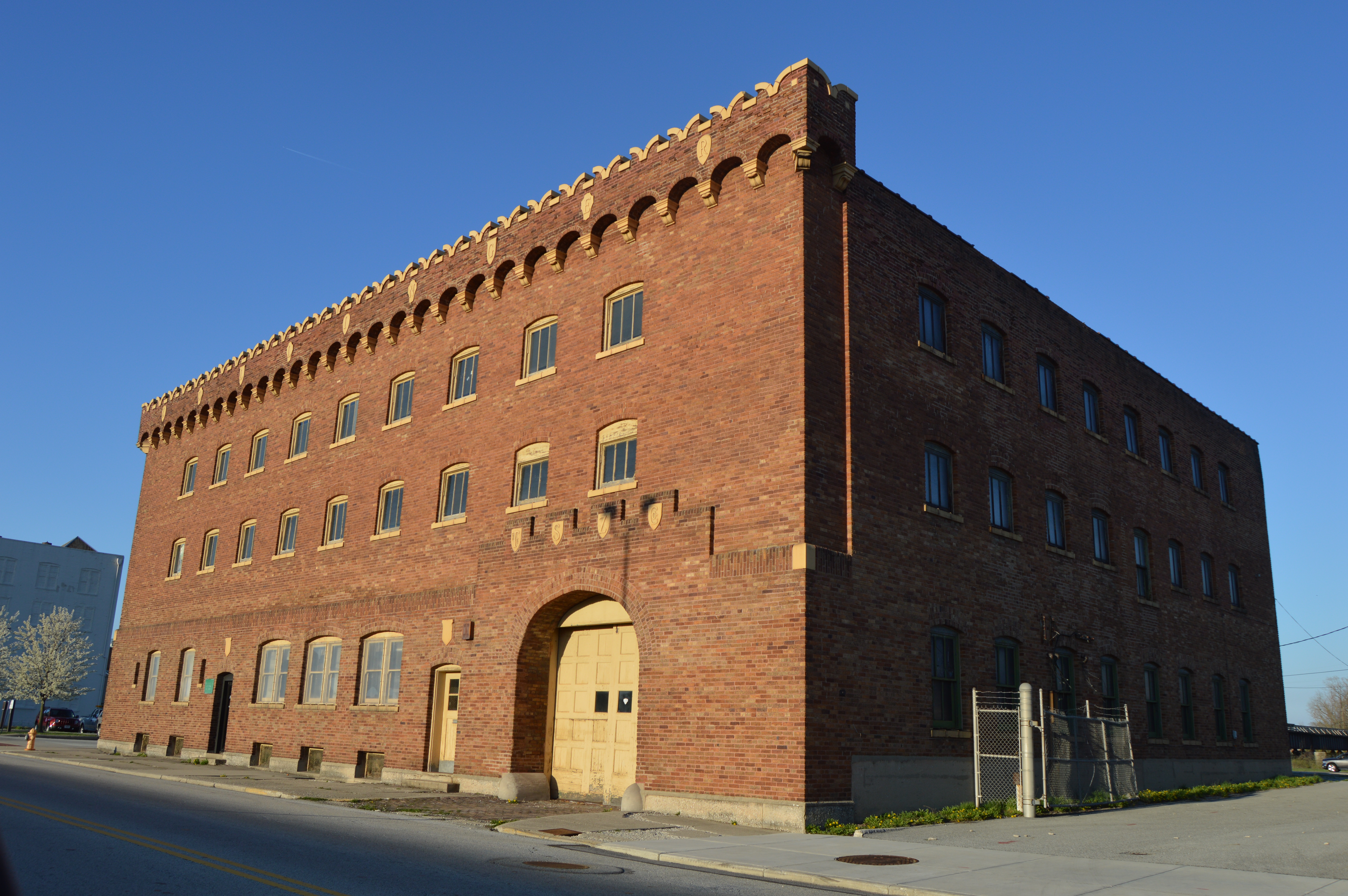

- Location within Ohio
- Location: 101 S. Wayne St., Piqua, Ohio
- Coordinates: 40°08′47″N 84°14′26″W
- Area: 0.2 acres (0.081 ha)
- Built: 1915
- Built by: Dayton Structural Construction Company
- Architect: William Earl Russ
- Architectural style: Romanesque Revival
- NRHP reference No.: 15000903
- Added to NRHP: December 15, 2015

The S. Zollinger Company Building is a historic grocery warehouse building in Piqua, Ohio at 101 S. Wayne Street. It is listed on the National Register of Historic Places.

S. Zollinger & Company was established by brothers Samuel Zollinger and John William Zollinger in 1890. The building was constructed in 1914 and 1915 after the Great Flood of 1913 in Piqua. The company's former building had access to the Miami Erie Canal and the new one was near rail.

A rectangular three-story building, it was constructed with reinforced concrete with exterior walls of brick. It has terracotta adjoining adornments and a basement.

The building was designed by Dayton architect William Earl Russ and built by Dayton Construction Company. It is Romanesque Revival in style. It was a grocery warehouse. As of 2021 it had been vacant for a decade and there was a plan to renovate it for mixed use.

== See also ==
- National Register of Historic Places listings in Miami County, Ohio
