= First Presbyterian Church (Troy, Ohio) =

- U.S. National Register of Historic Places
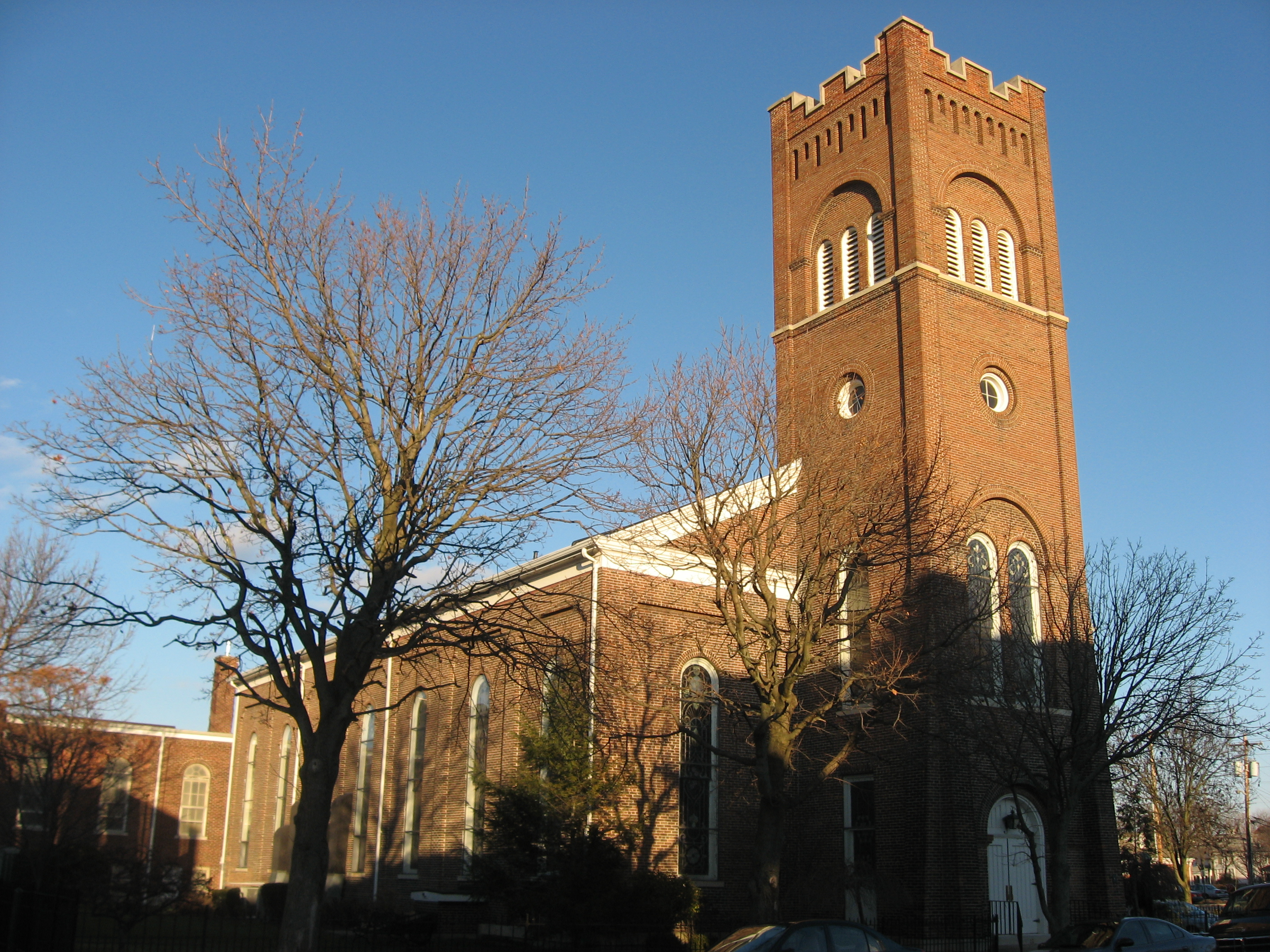
- Western side and front

- Location within Ohio Location within the United States
- Location: Franklin and Walnut Sts., Troy, Ohio
- Coordinates: 40°2′19″N 84°12′11″W
- Area: Less than 1 acre (0.40 ha)
- Built: 1859
- Architect: George Browning Reed
- Architectural style: Romanesque Revival
- NRHP reference No.: 76001493
- Added to NRHP: December 12, 1976

First Presbyterian Church is a historic Presbyterian church building in the city of Troy, Ohio, United States. Built in the 1860s, it was the third building used by a congregation formed nearly fifty years earlier. A high-quality example of period Romanesque Revival architecture, it has been named a historic site.

== Congregational history ==
The first settlers came to Concord Township in 1804, although Troy itself was not platted until 1807. The same year saw the organization of the township's first church, a New Light congregation, but it was 1815 before a Methodist class was formed in Troy as the city's first church. Presbyterian worship services began in 1818, led by missionary minister George Burgess; most services were held in the schoolhouse, although occasional services were held in the courthouse. A rude building served as the house of worship from 1826 until 1837, when the congregation divided: both sides of the Old School-New School Controversy were represented in the membership, and instead of fighting to retain the property, the two sides chose to sell the building and divide the proceeds. Although the New School congregation built a wooden church building in 1839, they commenced construction on the present building in 1859, and whilst the sanctuary was dedicated in late 1860, it required four years' work for completion. At some point in 1863 or 1864, the two congregations chose to reunite, despite the remaining division between the Old and New School denominations on the national level, which was only resolved in 1870.

== Architecture ==
First Presbyterian Church is a brick building with stone elements, set on a stone foundation. Constructed by George R. Browning, its style is the Romanesque Revival and represents some of the best pre-Civil War architecture extant in Troy. The large sanctuary is simple, typical of traditional Presbyterianism, and its design demonstrates Browning's unusually high degree of skill. The overall plan is rectangular, although a tall flat-roofed tower sits at the front of the building, with an arched doorway set in its base and battlements at the top. Large arched windows, taller than the door, are placed on two levels of the tower, with an oculus between the levels on each side. Yet taller arch windows, nearly twice the height of the doors, are placed in the front (one on each side of the tower) and sides (six on each) of the building. The ends of the building rise to gables, which on the front is highlighted by a pediment behind the tower.

== Historic designation ==
In 1976, First Presbyterian Church was listed on the National Register of Historic Places, qualifying both because of its historically significant architecture and because of its place in local history. It is one of fifteen National Register-listed locations in Troy, and one of forty-four in Miami County. It is part of the Miami Valley Presbytery of the Presbyterian Church (USA).
