= John Minor Dye Stone House =

Historic house in Ohio, United States

- Dye, John Minor, Stone House
- U.S. National Register of Historic Places
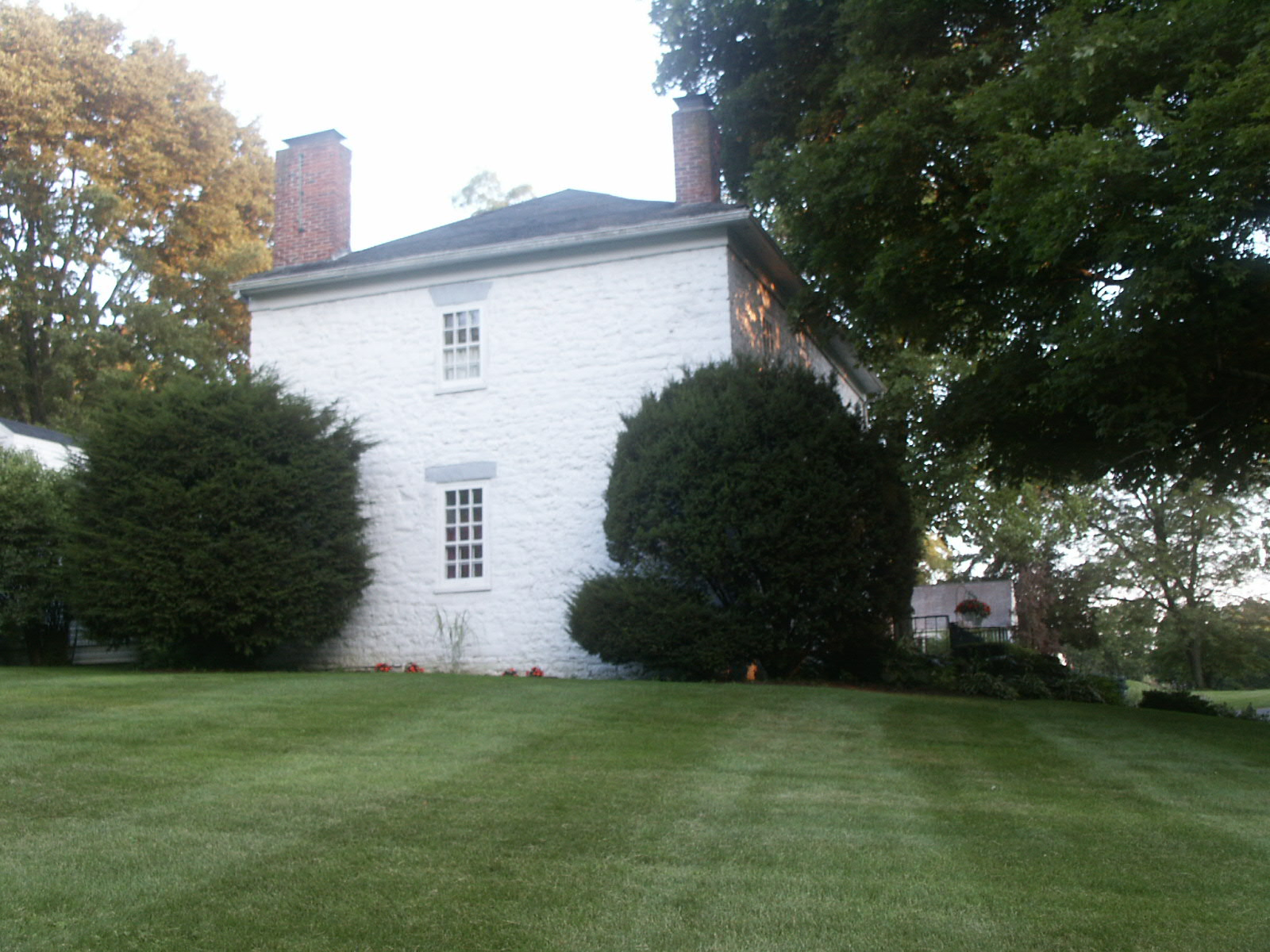
- Side of the house

- Location within Ohio Location within the United States
- Nearest city: Troy, Ohio
- Coordinates: 40°1′49″N 84°8′6″W
- Area: 1 acre (0.40 ha)
- Built: 1813
- NRHP reference No.: 83002008
- Added to NRHP: July 07, 1983

The John Minor Dye Stone House is located at 9 South Children's Home Road east of Troy in Elizabeth Township, Miami County, Ohio. The property was listed on the National Register on 1983-07-07.
