= Elizabeth Township =

Elizabeth Township may refer to one of the following townships in the United States:

- Elizabeth Township, Jo Daviess County, Illinois
- Elizabeth Township, Otter Tail County, Minnesota
- Elizabeth Township, Lawrence County, Ohio
- Elizabeth Township, Miami County, Ohio
- Elizabeth Township, New Jersey
- Elizabeth Township, Allegheny County, Pennsylvania
- Elizabeth Township, Lancaster County, Pennsylvania
