= Monroe Township, Miami County, Ohio =

Township in Ohio, US

- Township
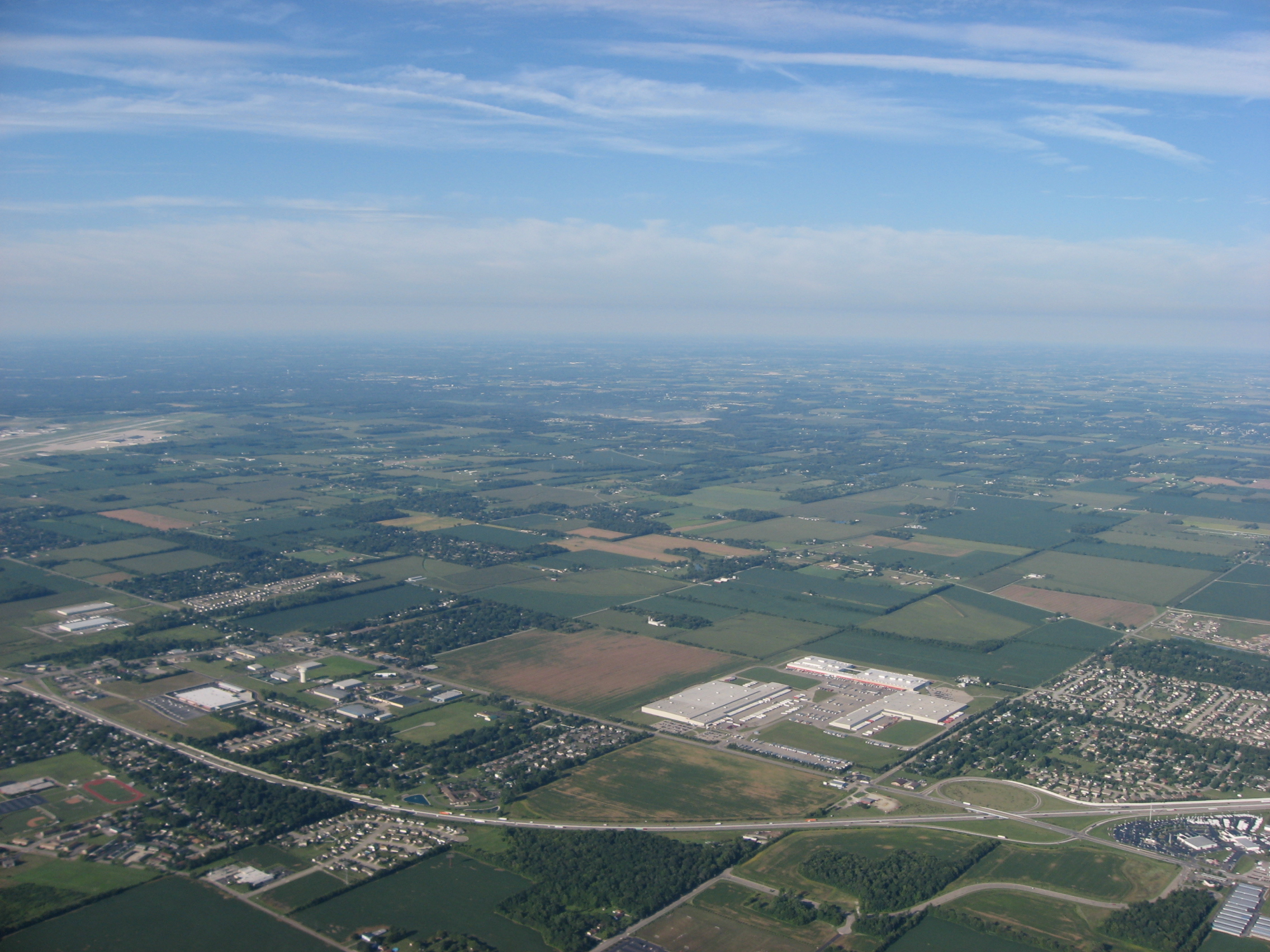
- Countryside in northern Monroe Township

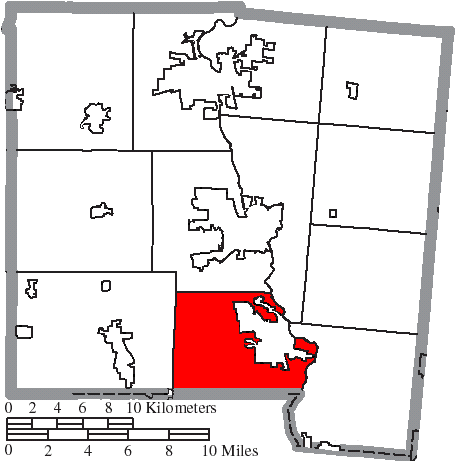
- Location of Monroe Township in Miami County
- Coordinates: 39°58′0″N 84°11′41″W
- Country: United States
- State: Ohio
- County: Miami

Area
  - Total: 30.8 sq mi (79.7 km^{2})
  - Land: 30.6 sq mi (79.3 km^{2})
  - Water: 0.19 sq mi (0.5 km^{2})
- Elevation: 902 ft (275 m)

Population (2020)
  - Total: 16,114
  - Density: 526/sq mi (203/km^{2})
- Time zone: UTC-5 (Eastern (EST))
  - Summer (DST): UTC-4 (EDT)
- FIPS code: 39-51492
- GNIS feature ID: 1086639
- Website: https://monroetwpohio.com/

Monroe Township is one of the twelve townships of Miami County, Ohio, United States. The 2020 census found 16,114 people in the township.

== Geography ==
Located in the southern part of the county, it borders the following townships:

- Concord Township - north
- Staunton Township - northeast
- Bethel Township - southeast
- Vandalia - south
- Butler Township, Montgomery County - southwest
- Union Township - west

The city of Tipp City is located in eastern Monroe Township.

== Name and history ==
It is one of twenty-two Monroe Townships statewide.

== Government ==
The township is governed by a three-member board of trustees, who are elected in November of odd-numbered years to a four-year term beginning on the following January 1. Two are elected in the year after the presidential election and one is elected in the year before it. There is also an elected township fiscal officer, who serves a four-year term beginning on April 1 of the year after the election, which is held in November of the year before the presidential election. Vacancies in the fiscal officership or on the board of trustees are filled by the remaining trustees.
