= Springcreek Township, Miami County, Ohio =

Township in Ohio, US

- Township
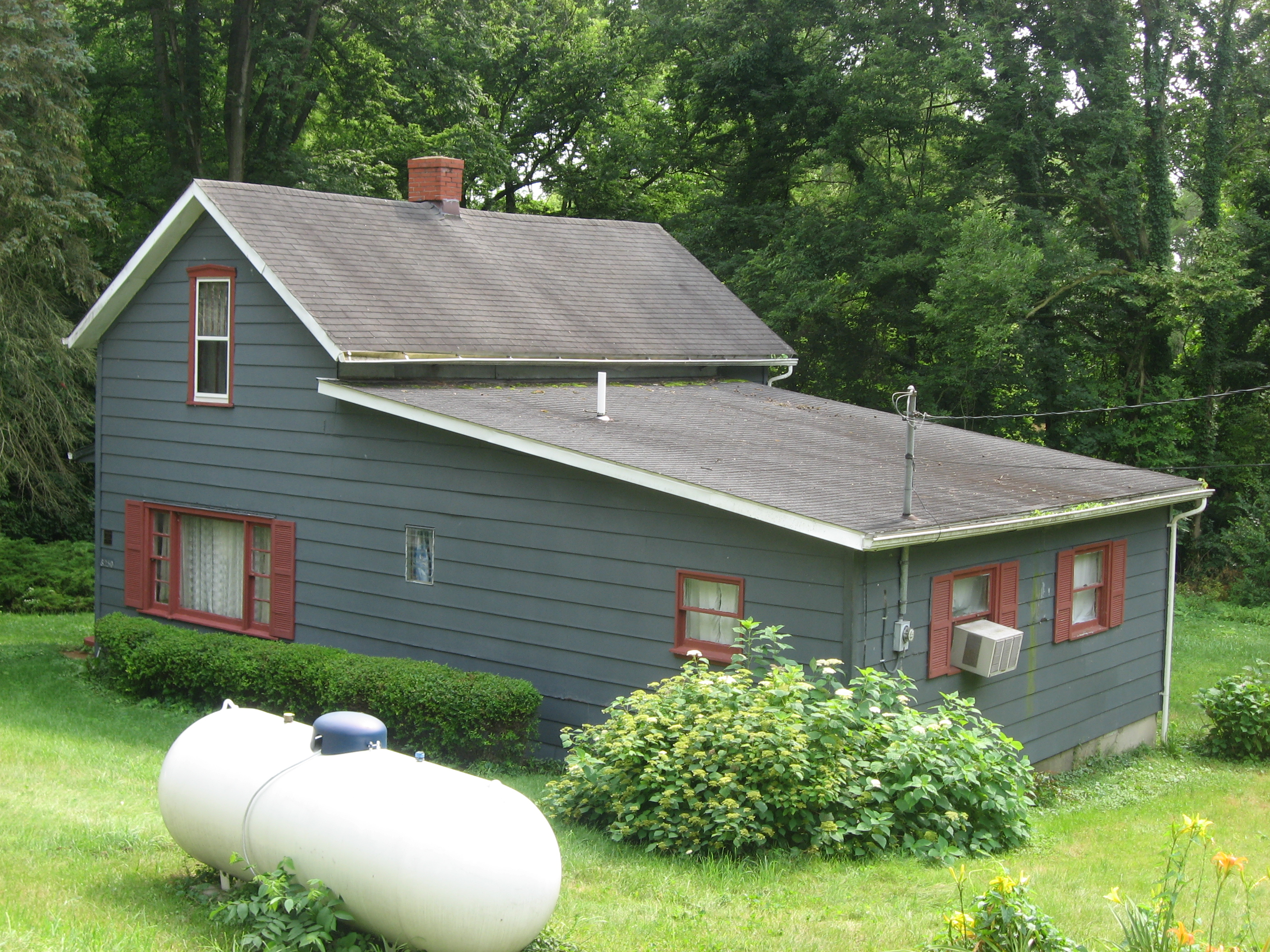
- York Rial House, built in 1890

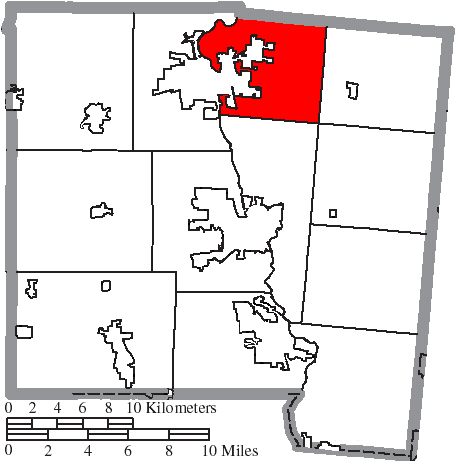
- Location of Springcreek Township in Miami County
- Coordinates: 40°9′19″N 84°12′24″W
- Country: United States
- State: Ohio
- County: Miami

Area
  - Total: 22.5 sq mi (58.4 km^{2})
  - Land: 22.5 sq mi (58.2 km^{2})
  - Water: 0.077 sq mi (0.2 km^{2})
- Elevation: 922 ft (281 m)

Population (2020)
  - Total: 2,144
  - Density: 95.4/sq mi (36.8/km^{2})
- Time zone: UTC-5 (Eastern (EST))
  - Summer (DST): UTC-4 (EDT)
- FIPS code: 39-74097
- GNIS feature ID: 1086642

Springcreek Township is one of the twelve townships of Miami County, Ohio, United States. The 2020 census found 2,144 people in the township.

== Geography ==
Located in the northern part of the county, it borders the following townships:

- Orange Township, Shelby County – north
- Brown Township – east
- Lostcreek Township – southeast corner
- Staunton Township – south
- Washington Township – west

Much of western Springcreek Township is occupied by the city of Piqua.

== Name and history ==
Springcreek Township was established in 1814, and named for its Spring Creek. It is the only Springcreek Township statewide.

== Government ==
The township is governed by a three-member board of trustees, who are elected in November of odd-numbered years to a four-year term beginning on the following January 1. Two are elected in the year after the presidential election and one is elected in the year before it. There is also an elected township fiscal officer, who serves a four-year term beginning on April 1 of the year after the election, which is held in November of the year before the presidential election. Vacancies in the fiscal officership or on the board of trustees are filled by the remaining trustees.

Meetings are typically held on the second and fourth Monday of the month. This changes with the holiday schedule and is agreed upon between the acting trustees. The meeting location is 8280 Piqua Lockington Rd Piqua, OH 45356.
