= Phoneton, Ohio =

Unincorporated community in Miami County, Ohio, United States

Coordinates: 39°53′49″N 84°08′07″W

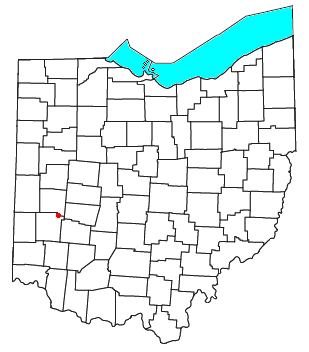
Location of Phoneton, Ohio

Phoneton (also known as Phonetown) is an unincorporated community in southwestern Bethel Township, Miami County, Ohio, United States, that is located at the junction of the National Road (U.S. Route 40) and Old Troy Pike (State Route 202) in southwestern Bethel Township, Miami County, Ohio, United States. It is part of the Dayton Metropolitan Statistical Area.

== History ==
Phoneton was originally called Phonetown, and under the latter name had its start in 1893 as a company town of the American Telephone and Telegraph Company. A post office called Phoneton was established in 1898, and remained in operation until 1981.
