= Washington Township, Miami County, Ohio =

Township in Ohio, US

- Township
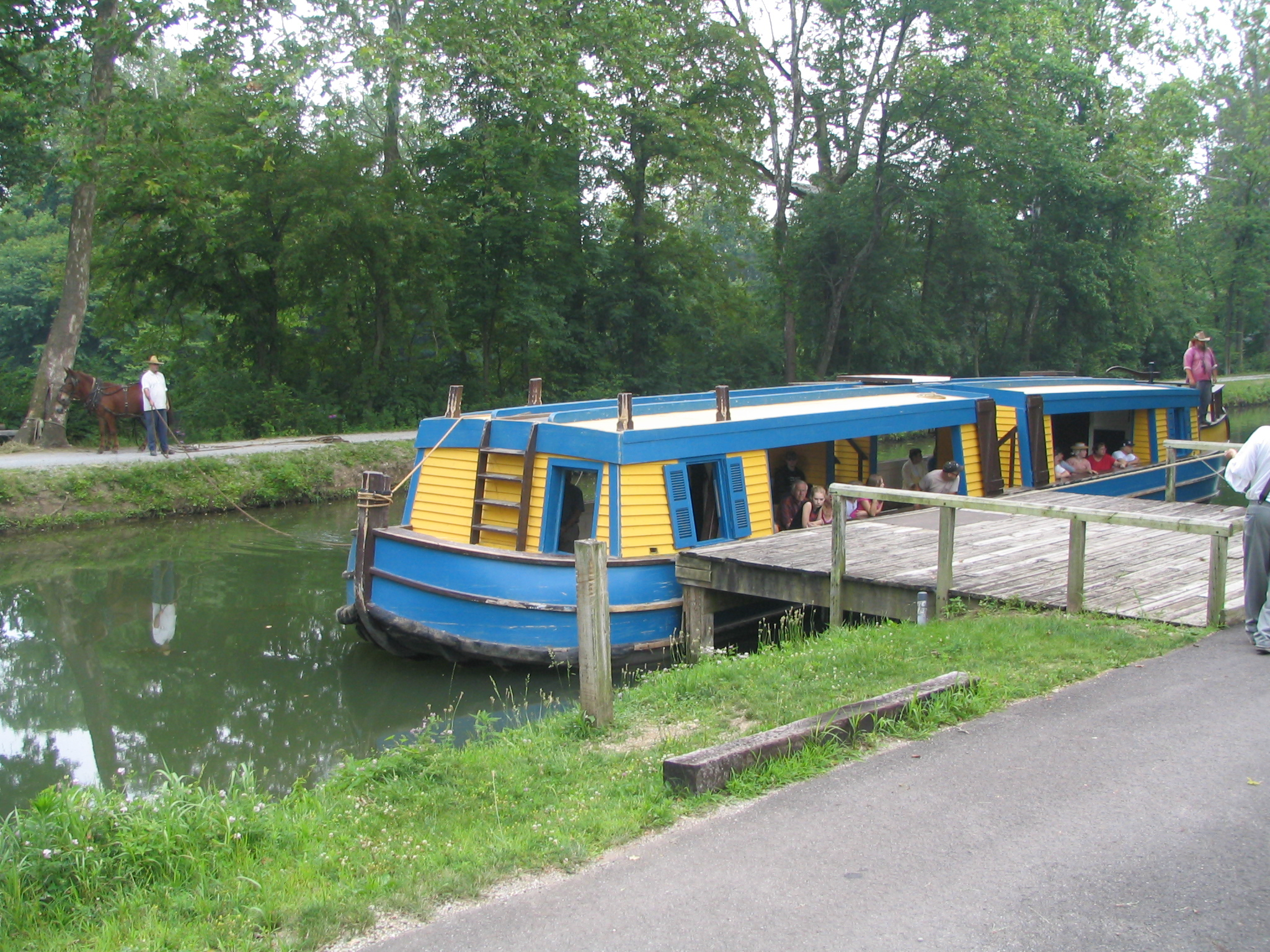
- Canal boat at the Piqua Historical Area State Memorial

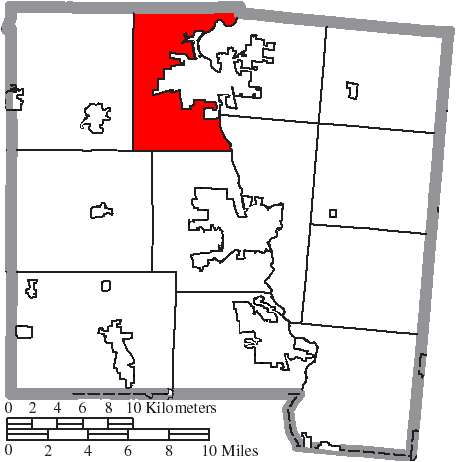
- Location of Washington Township in Miami County
- Coordinates: 40°9′35″N 84°16′11″W
- Country: United States
- State: Ohio
- County: Miami

Area
  - Total: 23.5 sq mi (60.9 km^{2})
  - Land: 23.3 sq mi (60.4 km^{2})
  - Water: 0.19 sq mi (0.5 km^{2})
- Elevation: 965 ft (294 m)

Population (2020)
  - Total: 1,503
  - Density: 64.4/sq mi (24.9/km^{2})
- Time zone: UTC-5 (Eastern (EST))
  - Summer (DST): UTC-4 (EDT)
- FIPS code: 39-81466
- GNIS feature ID: 1086645
- Website: https://washingtontownshiptrustees.com/

Washington Township is one of the twelve townships of Miami County, Ohio, United States. The 2020 census found 1,503 people in the township.

== Geography ==
Located in the northern part of the county, it borders the following townships:

- Washington Township, Shelby County - north
- Orange Township, Shelby County - northeast
- Springcreek Township - east
- Staunton Township - southeast
- Concord Township - south
- Newton Township - southwest
- Newberry Township - west
- Loramie Township, Shelby County - northwest

== Name and history ==
Washington Township was established in 1814. It is one of forty-three Washington Townships statewide.

== Government ==
The township is governed by a three-member board of trustees, who are elected in November of odd-numbered years to a four-year term beginning on the following January 1. Two are elected in the year after the presidential election and one is elected in the year before it. There is also an elected township fiscal officer, who serves a four-year term beginning on April 1 of the year after the election, which is held in November of the year before the presidential election. Vacancies in the fiscal officer or on the board of trustees are filled by the remaining trustees.
