= William Baumgardner Farm =

- William Baumgardner House and Farm Buildings
- U.S. National Register of Historic Places
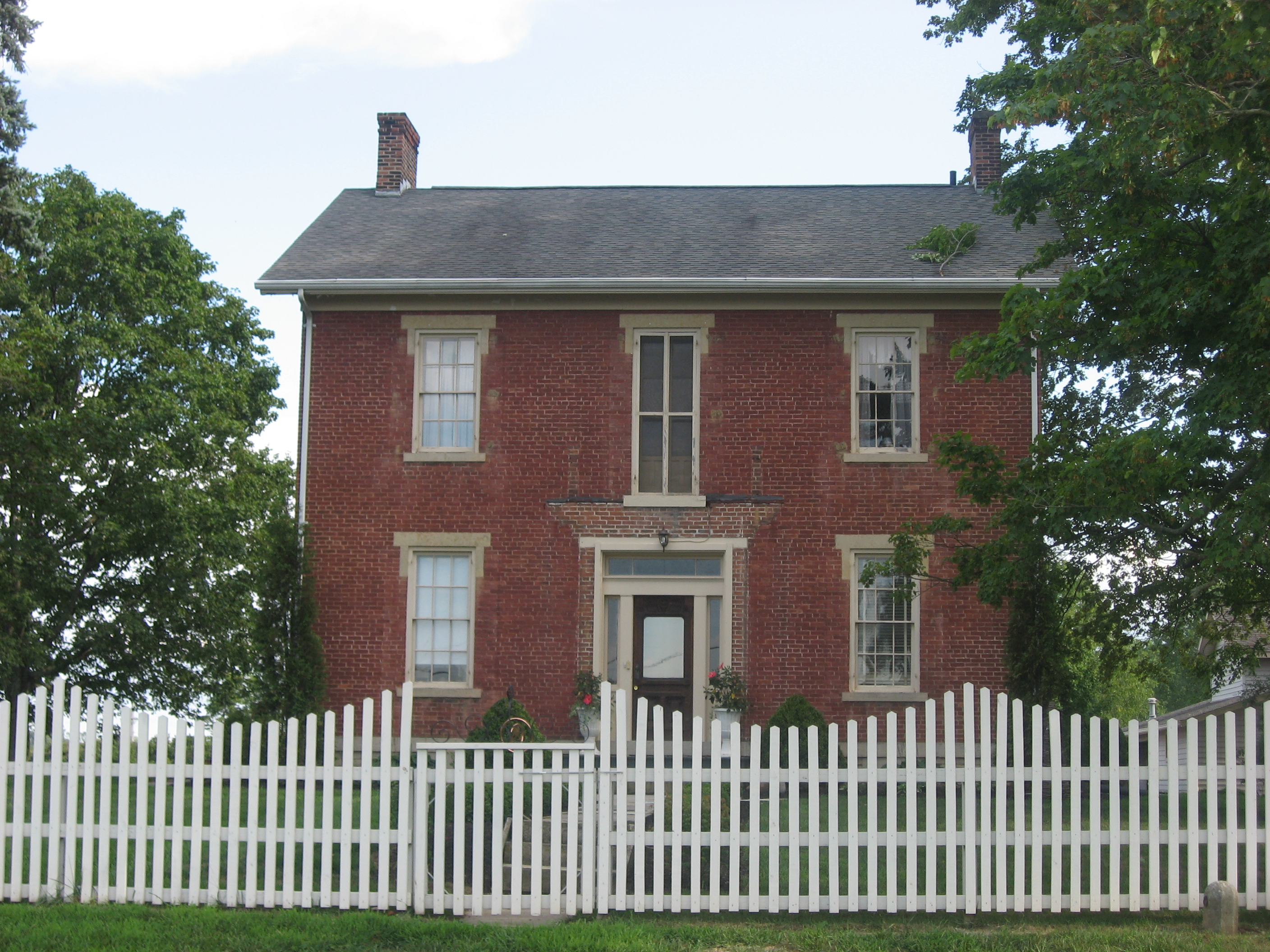
- Front of the farmhouse

- Location within Ohio Location within the United States
- Location: 8390 National Road (U.S. Route 40), New Carlisle, Ohio
- Coordinates: 39°54′22″N 84°3′35″W
- Area: 5 acres (2.0 ha)
- Built: 1857
- Architect: William Baumgardner
- NRHP reference No.: 78002141
- Added to NRHP: February 17, 1978

The William Baumgardner Farm is a historic farmstead located near New Carlisle in Miami County, Ohio, United States. Constructed in 1857, the site remains typical of period farmsteads, and it has been named a historic site.

William Baumgardner was one of Miami County's wealthiest farmers, and his landholdings were among the county's widest. He was able to pay for the construction of the entire complex in 1857, including the house, a separate summer kitchen, one large barn for animal shelter and hay storage, a granary, a spring house, a barn for seed storage, and a carriage house. Comparatively few changes have been made to the complex, which accordingly remains among the region's best-preserved farmsteads from the middle of the nineteenth century.

Baumgardner's house is a two-story brick building placed on a stone foundation. Chimneys sit on either end of the roofline, which is created by gables on either side. Both the side and the facade comprise three bays, with the middle bay of the facade occupied by a portico-sheltered door on the first story and a secondary door opening onto the portico roof on the second story. A single-story extension sits at the rear, causing the general floor plan to have the shape of the letter "T". Inside, the original features are still present. Buildings throughout the complex possess decorative features such as cupolas and miniature gables, giving the farmstead an appearance of architectural harmony. None of the buildings in the farmstead have been moved since their construction.

In early 1978, the Baumgardner Farm was listed on the National Register of Historic Places, qualifying both because of its place in local history and because of its historically significant architecture. The complex comprises six contributing properties, all of which are buildings. The complex is one of three National Register-listed locations near New Carlisle, along with Olive Branch High School and Ollie's Tavern in Clark County to the east.
