= Fort Piqua Plaza =

- Fort Piqua Hotel
- U.S. National Register of Historic Places
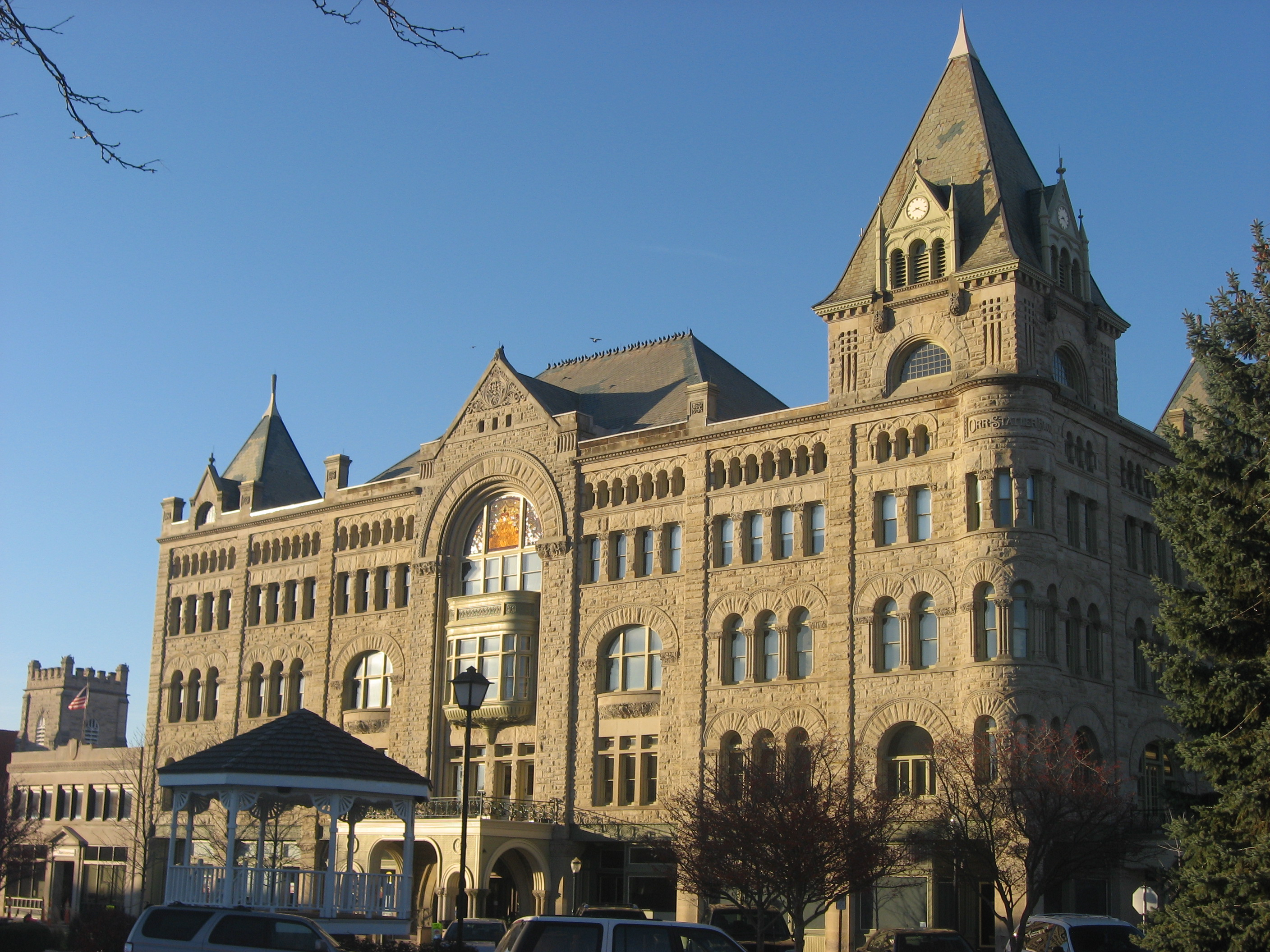

- Location within Ohio Location within the United States
- Location: 114 W. Main St., Piqua, Ohio
- Coordinates: 40°08′56″N 84°14′24″W
- Area: 1 acre (0.40 ha)
- Built: 1890-91
- Architectural style: Late Victorian
- NRHP reference No.: 74001576
- Added to NRHP: February 15, 1974

Fort Piqua Plaza is a historic hotel building (Fort Piqua Hotel) renovated for public uses including a library in downtown Piqua, Ohio. It was designed by Joseph W. Yost who is known for his many county courthouses, churches, and other major public buildings in and around Ohio and later New York City.

Fort Piqua Hotel is located at 114 W. Main St. It was built in 1890–91 in Late Victorian style. It has also been known as the Plaza Hotel and as the Favorite Hotel.

It was built as "The Plaza Hotel", a 4 1/2-story Richardsonian Romanesque-style rock-faced building developed by the partnership of Orr and Statler. It was opened as a hotel in 1892. Its entrance is in the center of its south side, in between commercial storefronts, under a three-story arch.

A major renovation and readaptation of the building was pursued in 2006 with a budget of $18 million for the 80,000 square foot building.
