= Bethel Township, Miami County, Ohio =

Township in Ohio, US

- Township
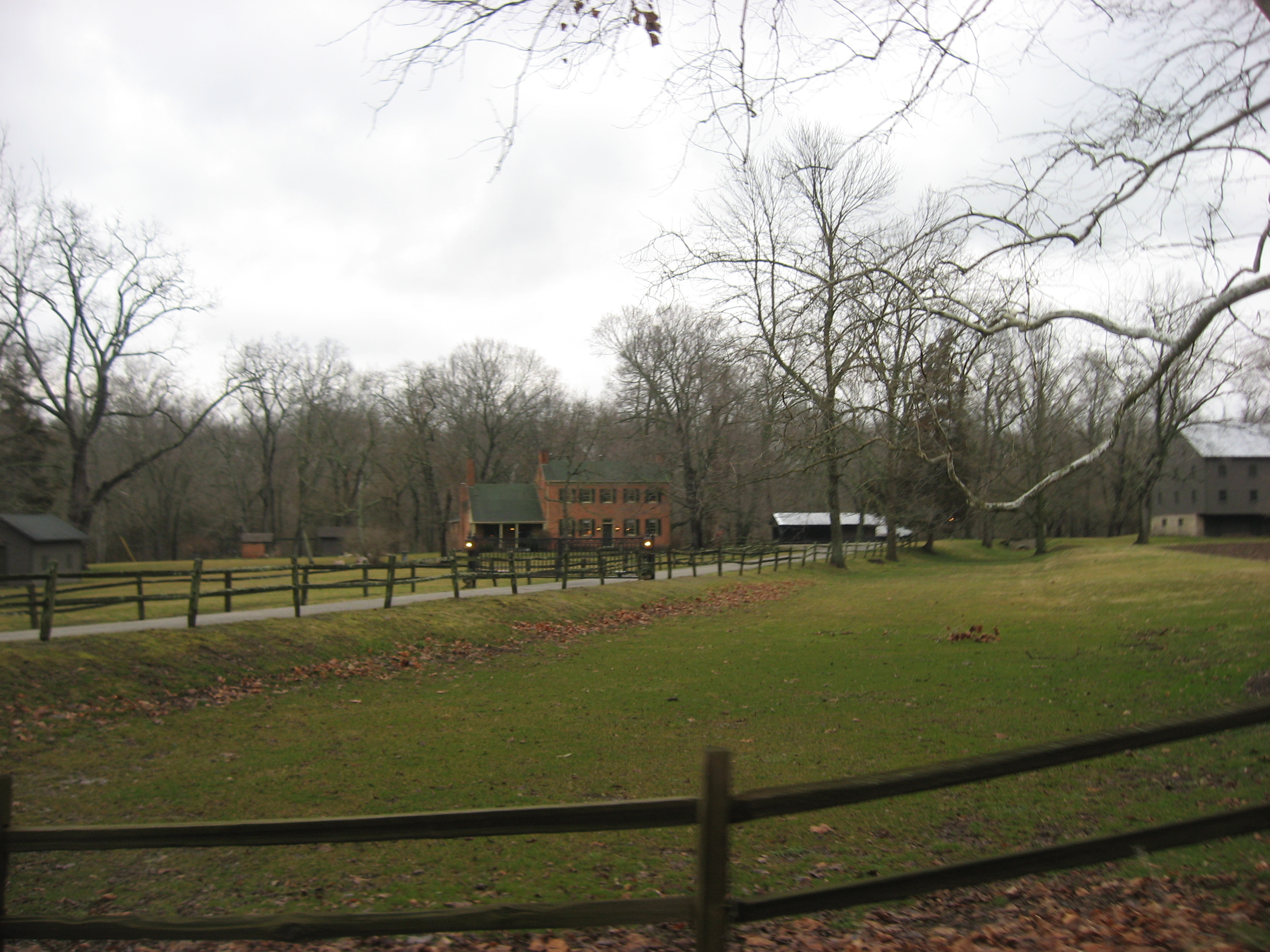
- A historic farm in the township

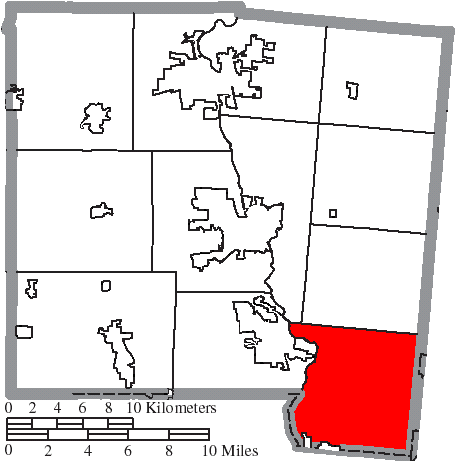
- Location of Bethel Township in Miami County
- Coordinates: 39°55′48″N 84°5′39″W
- Country: United States
- State: Ohio
- County: Miami

Area
  - Total: 34.7 sq mi (90.0 km^{2})
  - Land: 34.6 sq mi (89.7 km^{2})
  - Water: 0.12 sq mi (0.3 km^{2})
- Elevation: 997 ft (304 m)

Population (2020)
  - Total: 4,758
  - Density: 137/sq mi (53.0/km^{2})
- Time zone: UTC-5 (Eastern (EST))
  - Summer (DST): UTC-4 (EDT)
- FIPS code: 39-06110
- GNIS feature ID: 1086634

Bethel Township is one of the twelve townships of Miami County, Ohio, United States. The 2020 census found 4,758 people in the township.

== Geography ==
Located in the southeastern corner of the county, it borders the following townships:

- Elizabeth Township - north
- Pike Township, Clark County - northeast
- Bethel Township, Clark County - east
- Huber Heights - south
- Vandalia - southwest
- Monroe Township - west
- Staunton Township - northwest

Part of the city of Huber Heights is located in southwestern Bethel Township, and three unincorporated communities are located in the township:

- Brandt, in the south
- Phoneton, in the southwest
- West Charleston, in the west

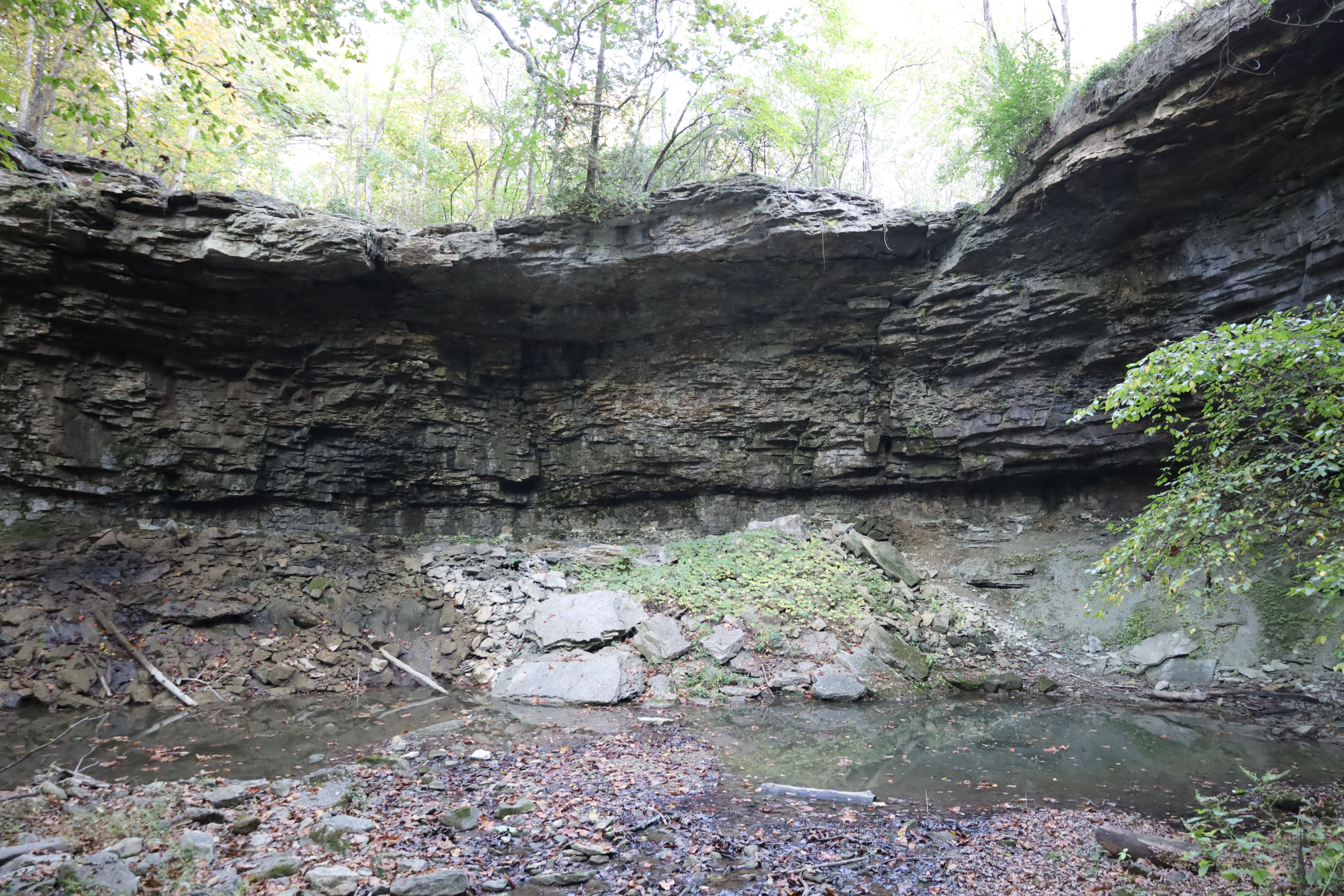
Charleston Falls

== Name and history ==
Statewide, other Bethel Townships are located in Clark and Monroe counties.

== Government ==
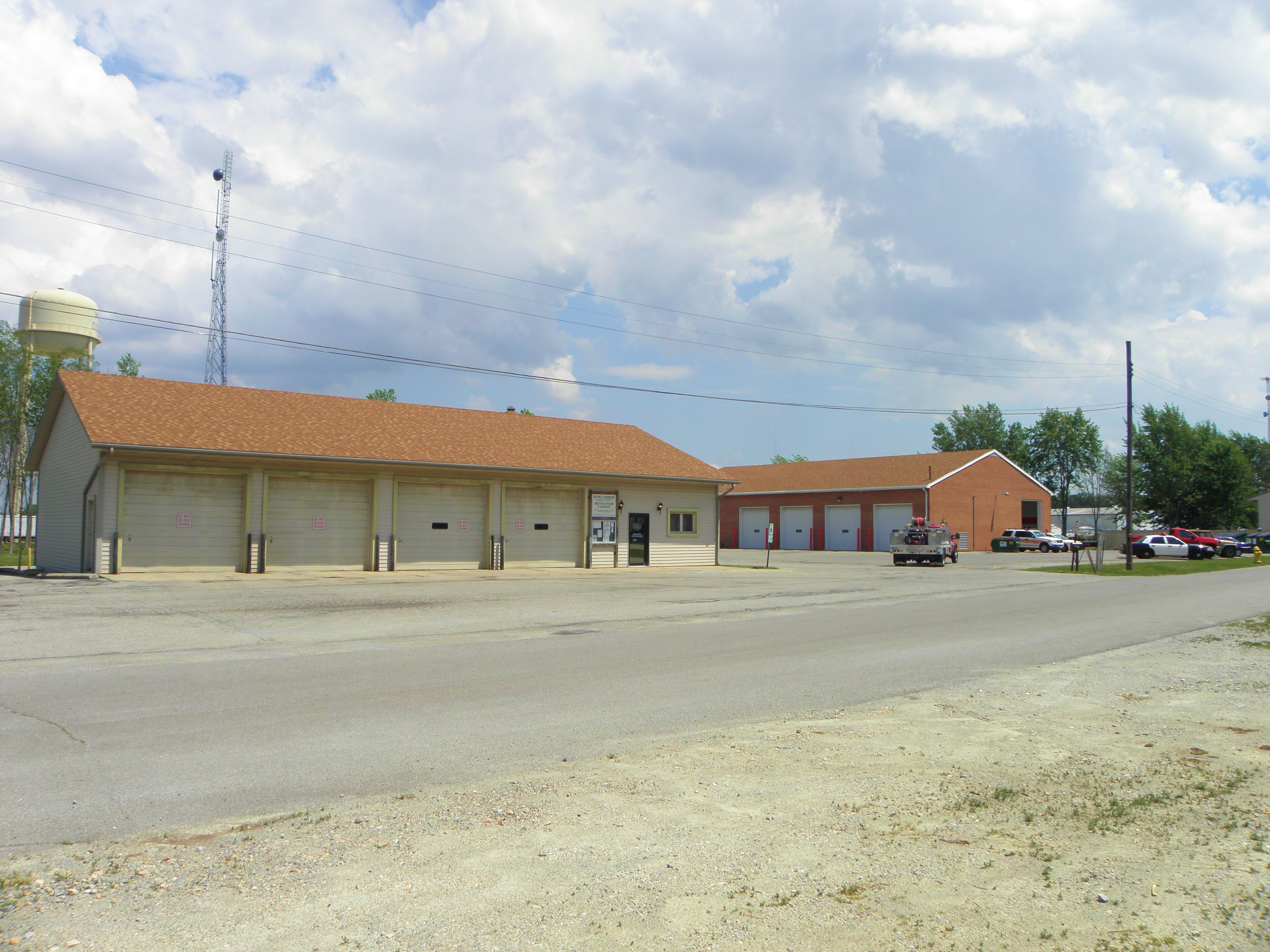
Bethel Township Town Hall

The township is governed by a three-member board of trustees, who are elected in November of odd-numbered years to a four-year term beginning on the following January 1. Two are elected in the year after the presidential election and one is elected in the year before it. There is also an elected township fiscal officer, who serves a four-year term beginning on April 1 of the year after the election, which is held in November of the year before the presidential election. Vacancies in the fiscal officership or on the board of trustees are filled by the remaining trustees. The trustees also select a township administrator.

As of July, 2020, the trustees are Beth van Haaren, Carolyn Wright and Don Black, the fiscal officer is Deborah Watson, and the township administrator is Andy Ehrhart.

As of January, 2024, the trustees are Beth van Haaren, Julie Reese, and Kama Dick, the fiscal officer is Rhonda Ross.

== Schools ==
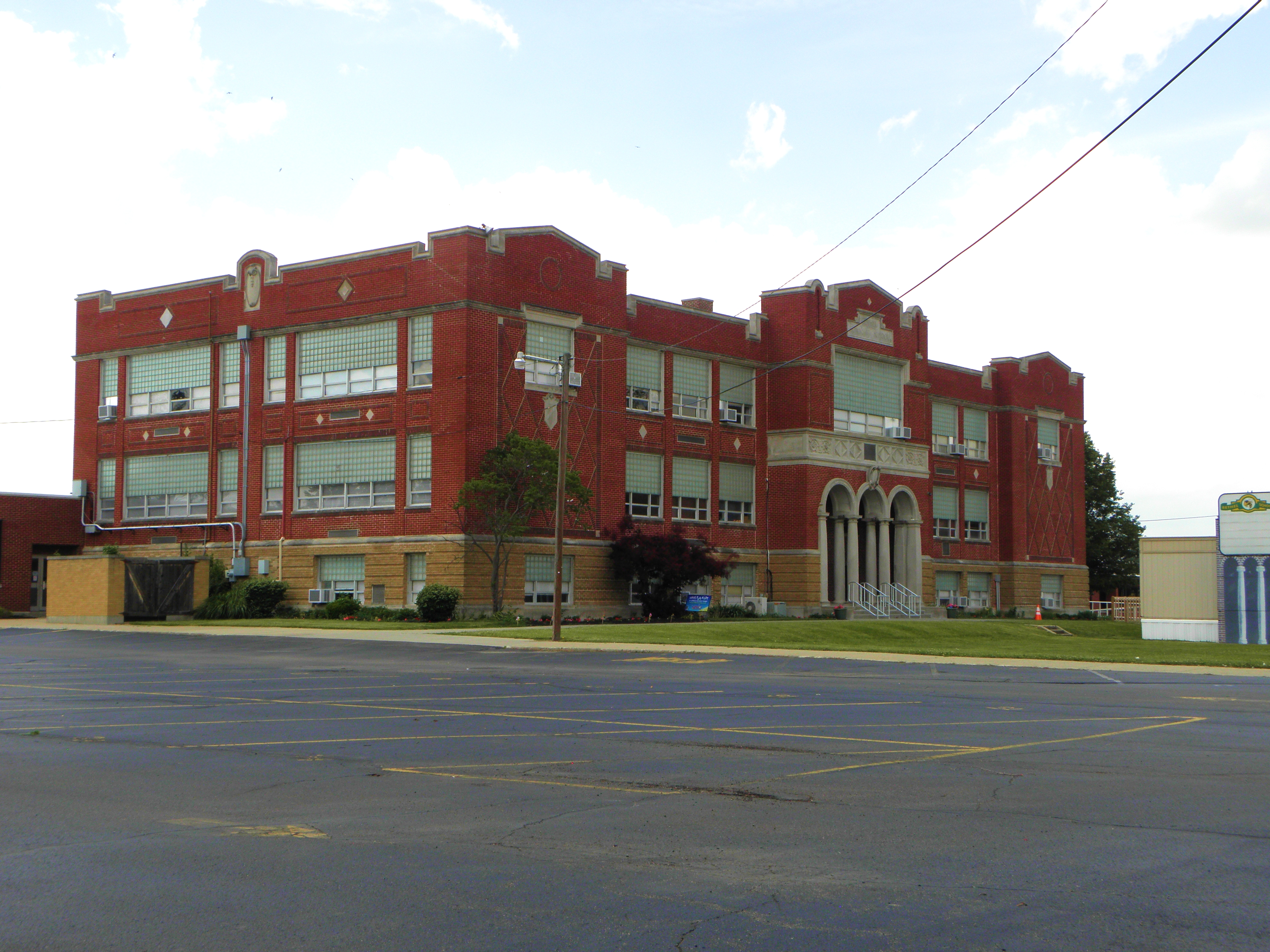
Bethel Township School

Students in Bethel Township attend Bethel Local Schools in Bethel Township or Miami East Local Schools in Casstown or Tecumseh Local Schools in New Carlisle.

== Notable residents ==
The township was the home of the ancestors of Wilbur and Orville Wright, who developed the first successful airplane The township was also the home of Roy J. Plunkett, inventor of Teflon, and Gale Halderman, the original designer of the Ford Mustang.
