= Old Piqua High School =

- Piqua High School
- U.S. National Register of Historic Places
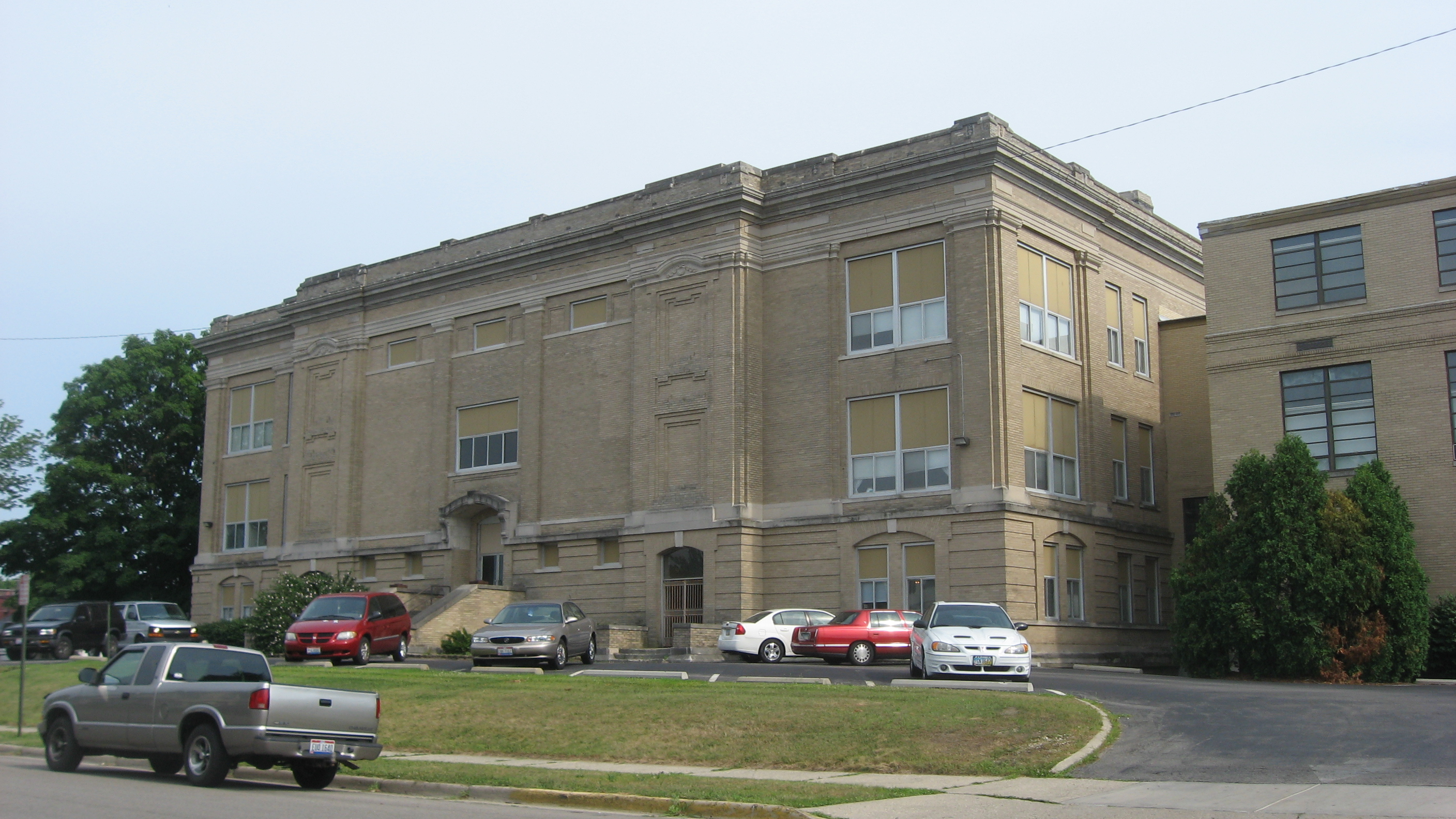
- Back of the school

- Location within Ohio Location within the United States
- Location: Piqua, Ohio
- Coordinates: 40°08′57″N 84°14′59″W
- Built: 1914
- Architect: Howard and Merriam
- Architectural style: Classical Revival
- NRHP reference No.: 96000927
- Added to NRHP: August 22, 1996

The former Piqua High School, built in 1914, is an historic building located at 316 North College Street in Piqua, Ohio. Also known as Piqua Central High School, it was designed by Howard and Merriam in the Classical Revival style.

On August 22, 1996, the building was added to the National Register of Historic Places.

== See also ==
- Piqua High School
