= Staunton Township, Miami County, Ohio =

Township in Ohio, US

- Township
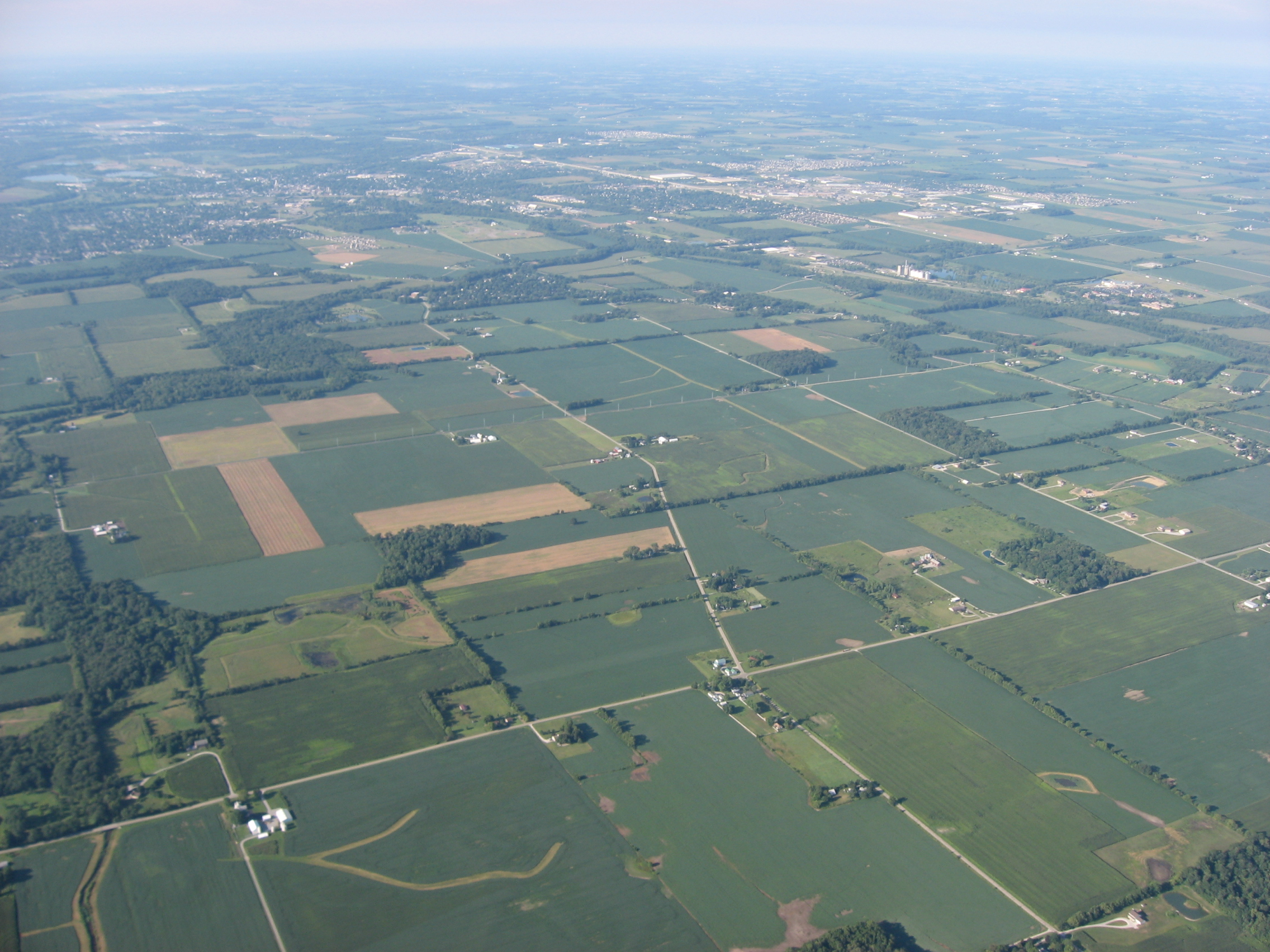
- Countryside in Staunton Township

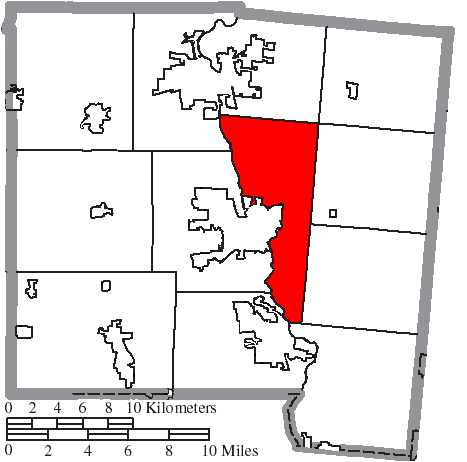
- Location of Staunton Township in Miami County
- Coordinates: 40°3′56″N 84°11′15″W
- Country: United States
- State: Ohio
- County: Miami

Area
  - Total: 26.3 sq mi (68.1 km^{2})
  - Land: 26.0 sq mi (67.4 km^{2})
  - Water: 0.31 sq mi (0.8 km^{2})
- Elevation: 843 ft (257 m)

Population (2020)
  - Total: 2,439
  - Density: 93.7/sq mi (36.2/km^{2})
- Time zone: UTC-5 (Eastern (EST))
  - Summer (DST): UTC-4 (EDT)
- FIPS code: 39-74475
- GNIS feature ID: 1086643

Staunton Township is one of the twelve townships of Miami County, Ohio, United States. The population was 2,439 at the 2020 census. It is the only Staunton Township statewide.

== Geography ==
Located in the central part of the county, it borders the following townships:

- Springcreek Township - north
- Brown Township - northeast corner
- Lostcreek Township - east
- Elizabeth Township - southeast
- Bethel Township - south
- Monroe Township - southwest
- Concord Township - west
- Washington Township - northwest

Part of the city of Troy, the county seat of Miami County, is located in western Staunton Township.

== Government ==
The township is governed by a three-member board of trustees, who are elected in November of odd-numbered years to a four-year term beginning on the following January 1. Two are elected in the year after the presidential election and one is elected in the year before it. There is also an elected township fiscal officer, who serves a four-year term beginning on April 1 of the year after the election, which is held in November of the year before the presidential election. Vacancies in the fiscal officership or on the board of trustees are filled by the remaining trustees.
