= Pleasant Hill, Ohio =

- Village
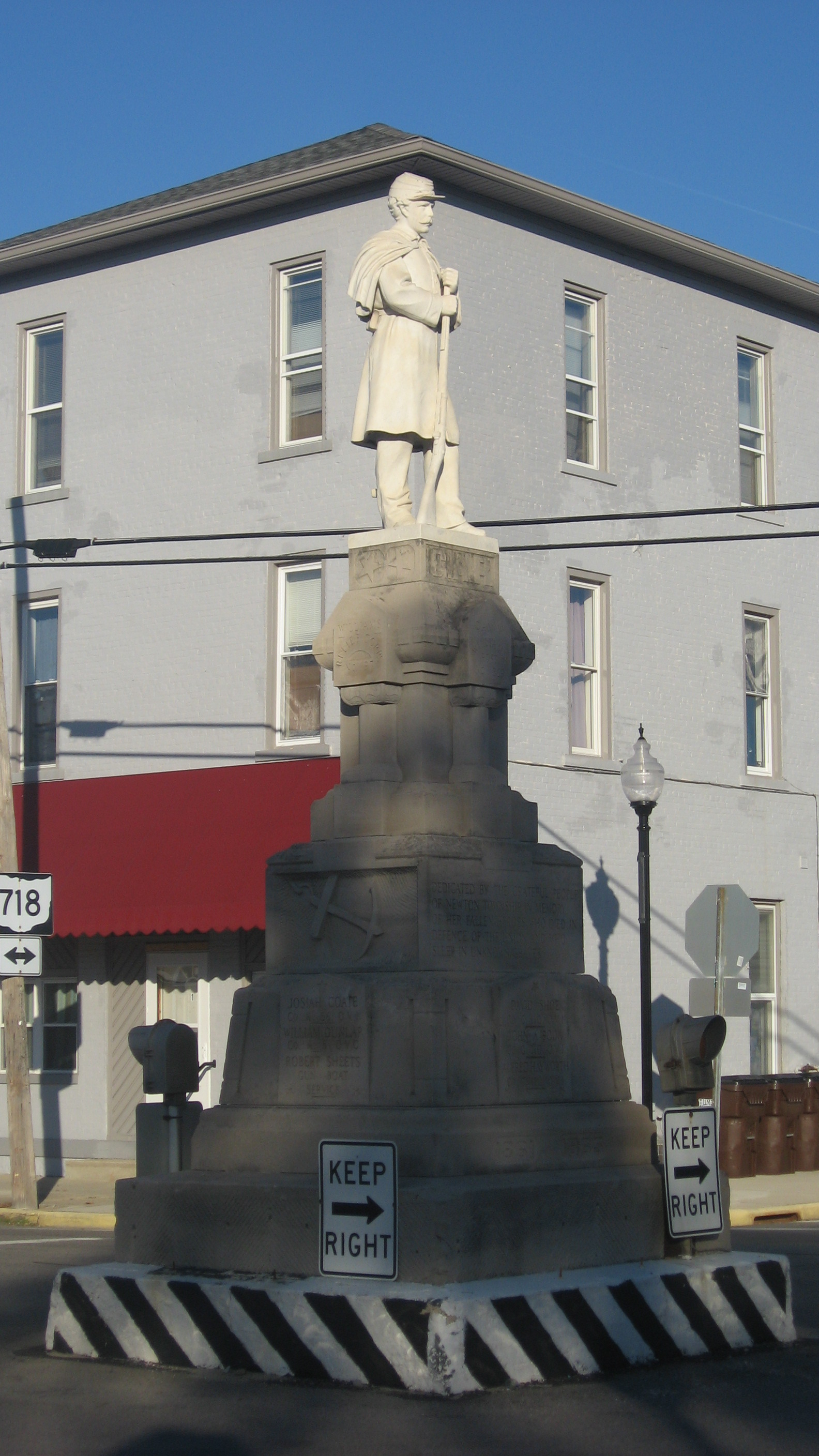
- Pleasant Hill's Civil War monument

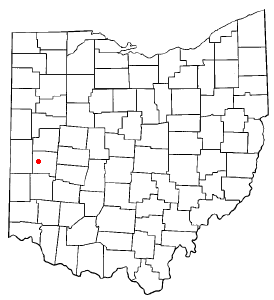
- Location of Pleasant Hill, Ohio

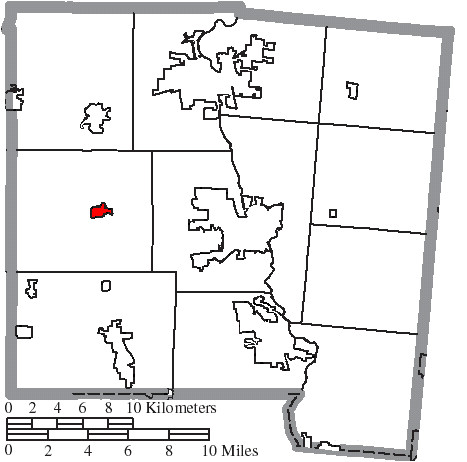
- Location of Pleasant Hill in Miami County
- Coordinates: 40°03′02″N 84°20′46″W
- Country: United States
- State: Ohio
- County: Miami
- Township: Newton
- Established: 1866

Government
  - Mayor: Brenda Carroll
  - President-Pro Tem: Penny Fessler
  - Council Members: Penny Fessler, Teri Stivers, Faith Renner, Lee Rademachir, Charles Tackett, Matt Gray

Area
  - Total: 0.63 sq mi (1.63 km^{2})
  - Land: 0.63 sq mi (1.63 km^{2})
  - Water: 0 sq mi (0.00 km^{2})
- Elevation: 925 ft (282 m)

Population (2020)
  - Total: 1,241
  - Density: 1,973/sq mi (761.7/km^{2})
- Time zone: UTC-5 (Eastern (EST))
  - Summer (DST): UTC-4 (EDT)
- ZIP code: 45359
- Area codes: 937, 326
- FIPS code: 39-63534
- GNIS feature ID: 2399691
- Website: https://www.pleasanthillohio.com/

Pleasant Hill is a village in Miami County, Ohio, United States. The population was 1,241 at the 2020 census. It is part of the Dayton Metropolitan Statistical Area.

== History ==
Pleasant Hill was originally called Newton, and under the latter name was platted in 1843. A post office called Pleasant Hill has been in operation since 1839, although the post office was originally located about one mile away from its present location. The village was incorporated in 1866.

== Geography ==
According to the United States Census Bureau, the village has a total area of 0.61 square miles (1.58 km^{2}), all land.

== Demographics ==
Historical population
Census	Pop.	Note	%±
1870	324		—
1880	461		42.3%
1890	521		13.0%
1900	557		6.9%
1910	571		2.5%
1920	682		19.4%
1930	746		9.4%
1940	738		−1.1%
1950	940		27.4%
1960	1,060		12.8%
1970	1,025		−3.3%
1980	1,051		2.5%
1990	1,066		1.4%
2000	1,134		6.4%
2010	1,200		5.8%
2020	1,241		3.4%
U.S. Decennial Census

=== 2010 census ===
As of the census of 2010, there were 1,200 people, 458 households, and 327 families living in the village. The population density was 1,967.2 inhabitants per square mile (759.5/km^{2}). There were 498 housing units at an average density of 816.4 per square mile (315.2/km^{2}). The racial makeup of the village was 98.7% White, 0.3% African American, 0.1% Native American, 0.3% Asian, 0.2% from other races, and 0.6% from two or more races. Hispanic or Latino of any race were 1.9% of the population.

There were 458 households, of which 39.1% had children under the age of 18 living with them, 59.8% were married couples living together, 7.9% had a female householder with no husband present, 3.7% had a male householder with no wife present, and 28.6% were non-families. 24.0% of all households were made up of individuals, and 11.8% had someone living alone who was 65 years of age or older. The average household size was 2.62 and the average family size was 3.15.

The median age in the village was 35.7 years. 27.7% of residents were under the age of 18; 8.9% were between the ages of 18 and 24; 26% were from 25 to 44; 23.4% were from 45 to 64; and 14.1% were 65 years of age or older. The gender makeup of the village was 48.4% male and 51.6% female.

=== 2000 census ===
As of the census of 2000, there were 1,134 people, 423 households, and 326 families living in the village. The population density was 2,393.0 inhabitants per square mile (923.9/km^{2}). There were 437 housing units at an average density of 922.2 per square mile (356.1/km^{2}). The racial makeup of the village was 99.38% White, 0.09% Native American, 0.18% Asian, and 0.35% from two or more races. Hispanic or Latino of any race were 0.26% of the population.

There were 423 households, 39.2% had children under the age of 18 living with them, 68.3% were married couples living together, 7.6% had a female householder with no husband present, and 22.7% were non-families. 19.6% of all households were made up of individuals, and 10.2% had someone living alone who was 65 years of age or older. The average household size was 2.68 and the average family size was 3.10.

In the village, the population was spread out, with 29.9% under the age of 18, 5.6% from 18 to 24, 29.9% from 25 to 44, 21.6% from 45 to 64, and 13.1% who were 65 years of age or older. The median age was 35 years. For every 100 females there were 91.9 males. For every 100 females age 18 and over, there were 87.5 males.

The median income for a household in the village was $45,703, and the median income for a family was $50,260. Males had a median income of $38,036 versus $23,750 for females. The per capita income for the village was $18,477. About 2.1% of families and 2.6% of the population were below the poverty line, including 3.6% of those under age 18 and 1.6% of those age 65 or over.

== Education ==
The school district is Newton Local School District. The District includes Newton High School

Pleasant Hill has a public library, a branch of the Troy-Miami County Public Library.
