= Newton Township, Miami County, Ohio =

Township in Ohio, US

- Township
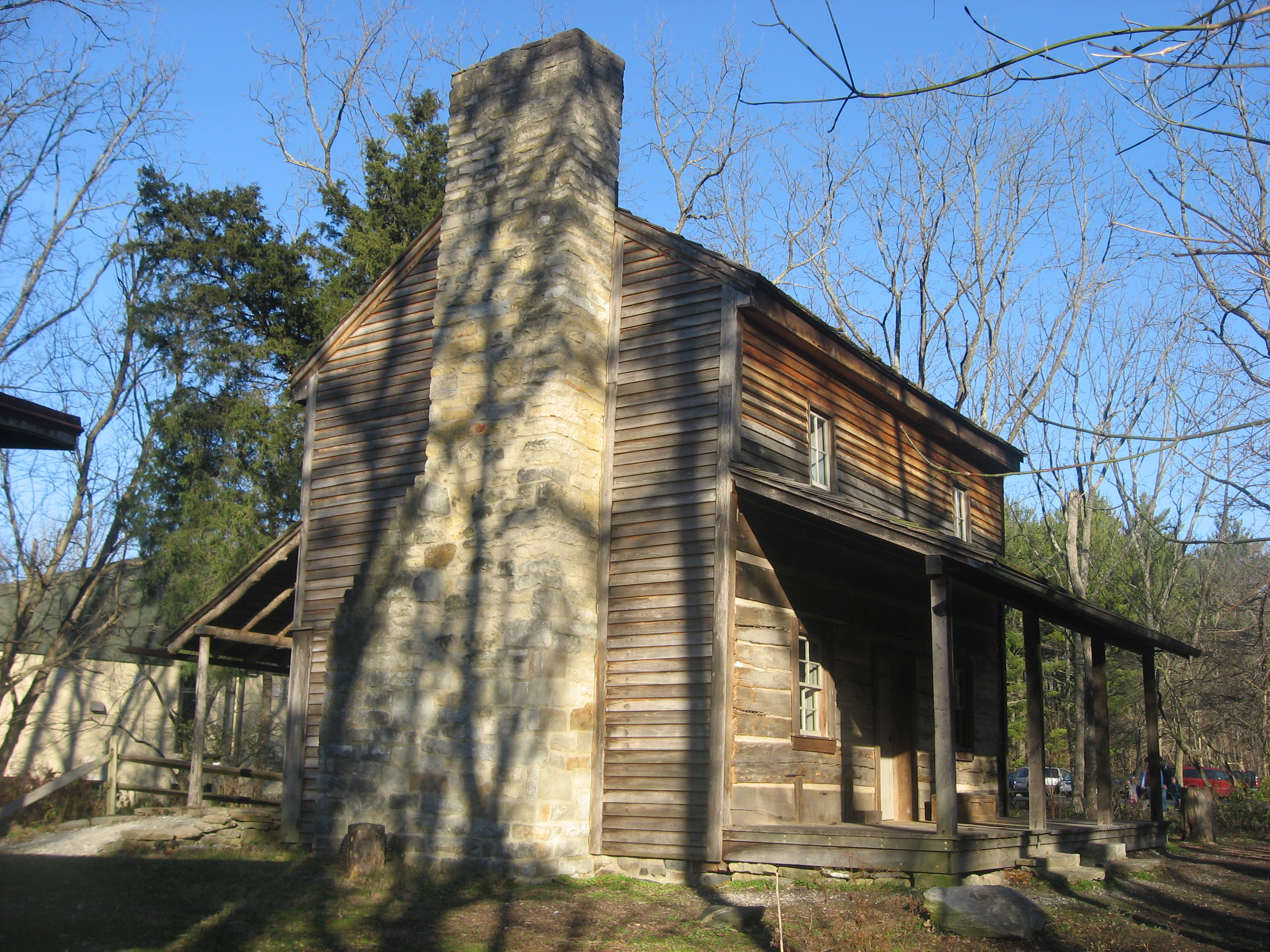
- Benjamin Iddings Log House

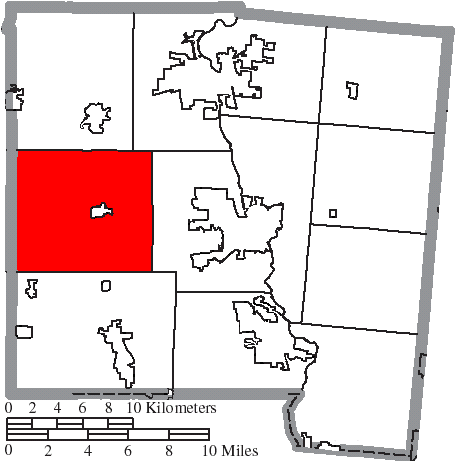
- Location of Newton Township in Miami County
- Coordinates: 40°3′10″N 84°21′35″W
- Country: United States
- State: Ohio
- County: Miami

Area
  - Total: 42.0 sq mi (108.8 km^{2})
  - Land: 41.7 sq mi (108.0 km^{2})
  - Water: 0.31 sq mi (0.8 km^{2})
- Elevation: 945 ft (288 m)

Population (2020)
  - Total: 3,516
  - Density: 84.32/sq mi (32.56/km^{2})
- Time zone: UTC-5 (Eastern (EST))
  - Summer (DST): UTC-4 (EDT)
- FIPS code: 39-55594
- GNIS feature ID: 1086641

Newton Township is one of the twelve townships of Miami County, Ohio, United States. The 2020 census found 3,516 people in the township.

== Geography ==
Located in the western part of the county, it borders the following townships:

- Newberry Township - north
- Washington Township - northeast
- Concord Township - east
- Union Township - south
- Monroe Township, Darke County - southwest corner
- Franklin Township, Darke County - west
- Adams Township, Darke County - northwest corner

The village of Pleasant Hill is located in central Newton Township.

== Name and history ==
One of five Newton Townships statewide, it was named for British scientist Isaac Newton.

== Government ==
The township is governed by a three-member board of trustees, who are elected in November of odd-numbered years to a four-year term beginning on the following January 1. Two are elected in the year after the presidential election and one is elected in the year before it. There is also an elected township fiscal officer, who serves a four-year term beginning on April 1 of the year after the election, which is held in November of the year before the presidential election. Vacancies in the fiscal officership or on the board of trustees are filled by the remaining trustees.
