= Overfield Tavern =

- U.S. National Register of Historic Places
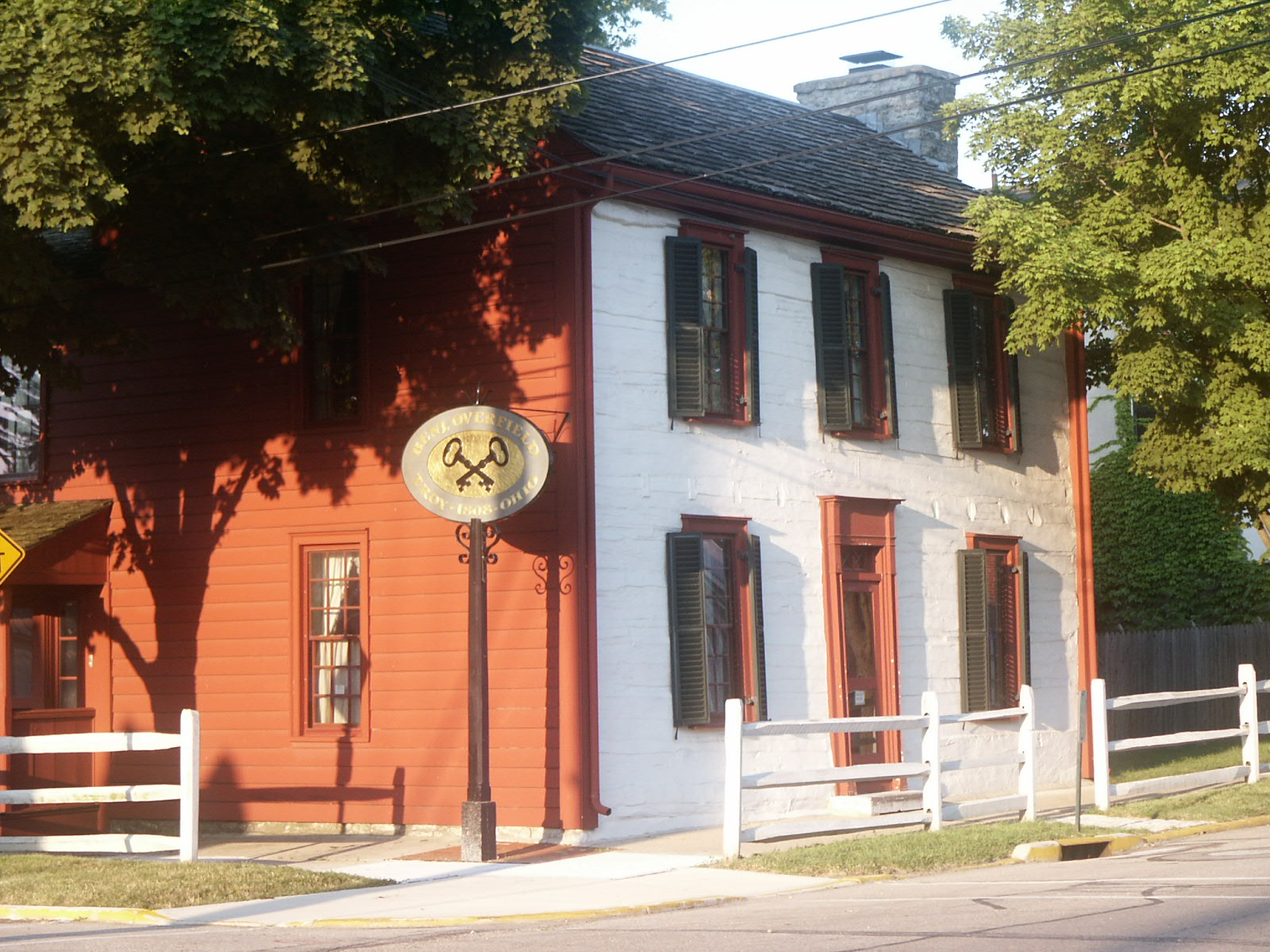
- Overfield Tavern in 2004
- Location: 201 E. Water St. Troy, Ohio 45373
- Coordinates: 40°02′23″N 84°12′02″W
- Built: 1808
- Architect: Benjamin Overfield
- Architectural style: Federal Style
- Website: http://overfieldtavernmuseum.com/
- NRHP reference No.: 76001495
- Added to NRHP: January 30, 1976

The Overfield Tavern is an early-nineteenth-century log tavern located along the bank of the Great Miami River in Troy, Ohio. Until December 2024, it was open to the public as a house museum. The main structure was built by Benjamin Overfield in 1808 and served as a tavern until 1824. The Overfield Tavern is the oldest surviving building in Troy, and one of the oldest buildings in Ohio. In 1976 the structure was listed on the National Register of Historic Places. The building was severely damaged due to a fire in the early morning hours of December 7, 2024, but remained standing.

The Overfield Tavern is believed to be the first house built in Troy. Additionally, the tavern served as Troy's first courthouse, with court held intermittently from 1808 to 1811. In the summer of 1807, the site of Troy was selected as the county seat of Miami County and platted by Andrew Wallace late that year. Benjamin Overfield purchased Lot 2 and completed the construction of his tavern by fall 1808. According to the Commissioners records of December 16, 1808, it was “ordered that the court to be held in Miami County shall be held in the house of Benjamin Overfield in Troy until a courthouse is built; he has agreed to furnish a room for the court to sit in, gratis, during the time or term aforesaid.” Although construction began on a new courthouse in the center of the town square a few years later, it was not completed until 1824. After a fire ravaged most of the log houses along Water Street that same year, Overfield moved his tavern business to the public square in part to be closer to the new courthouse. Fire again struck on December 7, 2024 leaving the Overfield Tavern severely damaged by a structure fire of unknown cause. The exterior thick log walls were deemed likely to survive, but the interior was “largely gutted”. A large, irreplaceable collection of local historical artifacts was lost in the blaze.

Prior to the 2024 fire, the property consisted of a two-story, hewn-log building with steeple notched corners constructed in 1808 and an earlier, circa-1803 log structure attached to the north side via an enclosed dogtrot. This smaller log structure was believed to have been the original one-room log cabin constructed by Benjamin Overfield for his family. A series of one-story additions on the north and east were constructed in the mid-nineteenth century. The building displays elements of the Federal style.
