= Concord Township, Miami County, Ohio =

Township in Ohio, US

- Township
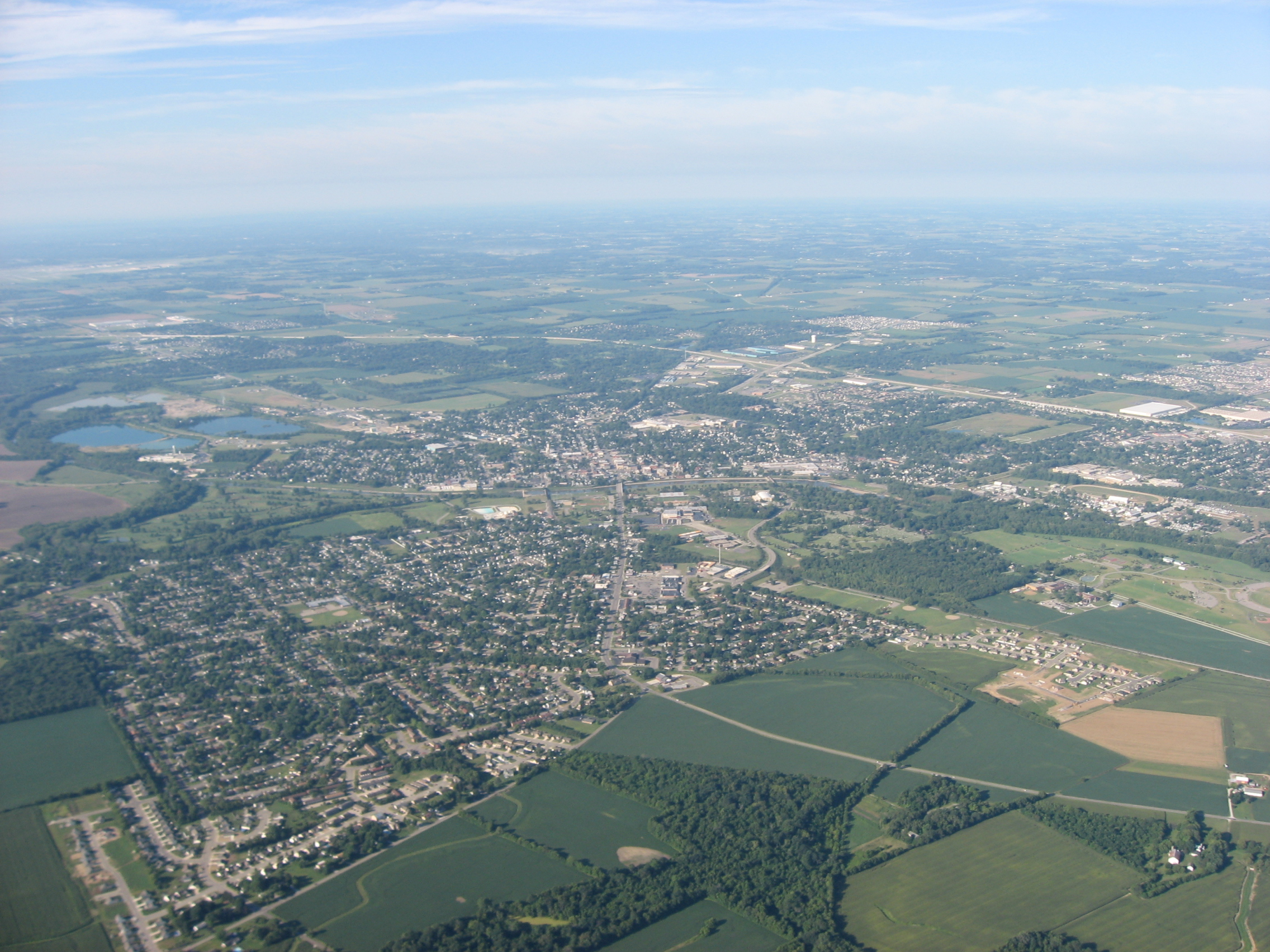
- Aerial view of Troy and Concord Township

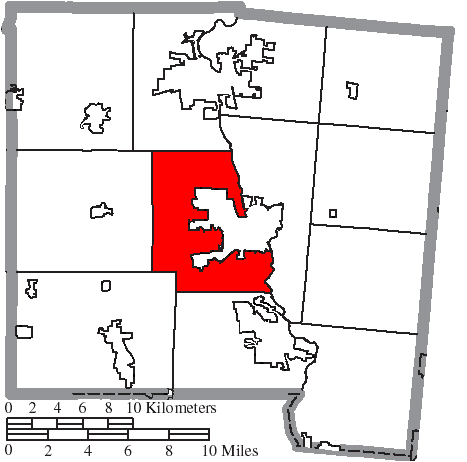
- Location of Concord Township in Miami County
- Coordinates: 40°2′19″N 84°12′50″W
- Country: United States
- State: Ohio
- County: Miami

Area
  - Total: 36.3 sq mi (94.1 km^{2})
  - Land: 36.2 sq mi (93.7 km^{2})
  - Water: 0.12 sq mi (0.3 km^{2})
- Elevation: 830 ft (253 m)

Population (2020)
  - Total: 31,417
  - Density: 868/sq mi (335/km^{2})
- Time zone: UTC-5 (Eastern (EST))
  - Summer (DST): UTC-4 (EDT)
- FIPS code: 39-18224
- GNIS feature ID: 1086636
- Website: http://www.concord-township.com/

Concord Township is one of the twelve townships of Miami County, Ohio, United States. The 2020 census found 31,147 people in the township.

== Geography ==
Located in the central part of the county, it borders the following townships:

- Washington Township - north
- Staunton Township - east
- Monroe Township - south
- Union Township - southwest
- Newton Township - west

Most of the city of Troy, the county seat of Miami County, is located in eastern Concord Township.

== Name and history ==
Concord Township was established around 1807. It is one of seven Concord Townships statewide.

== Government ==
The township is governed by a three-member board of trustees, who are elected in November of odd-numbered years to a four-year term beginning on the following January 1. Two are elected in the year after the presidential election and one is elected in the year before it. There is also an elected township fiscal officer, who serves a four-year term beginning on April 1 of the year after the election, which is held in November of the year before the presidential election. Vacancies in the fiscal officership or on the board of trustees are filled by the remaining trustees.
