= Elizabeth Township, Miami County, Ohio =

Township in Ohio, US

- Township
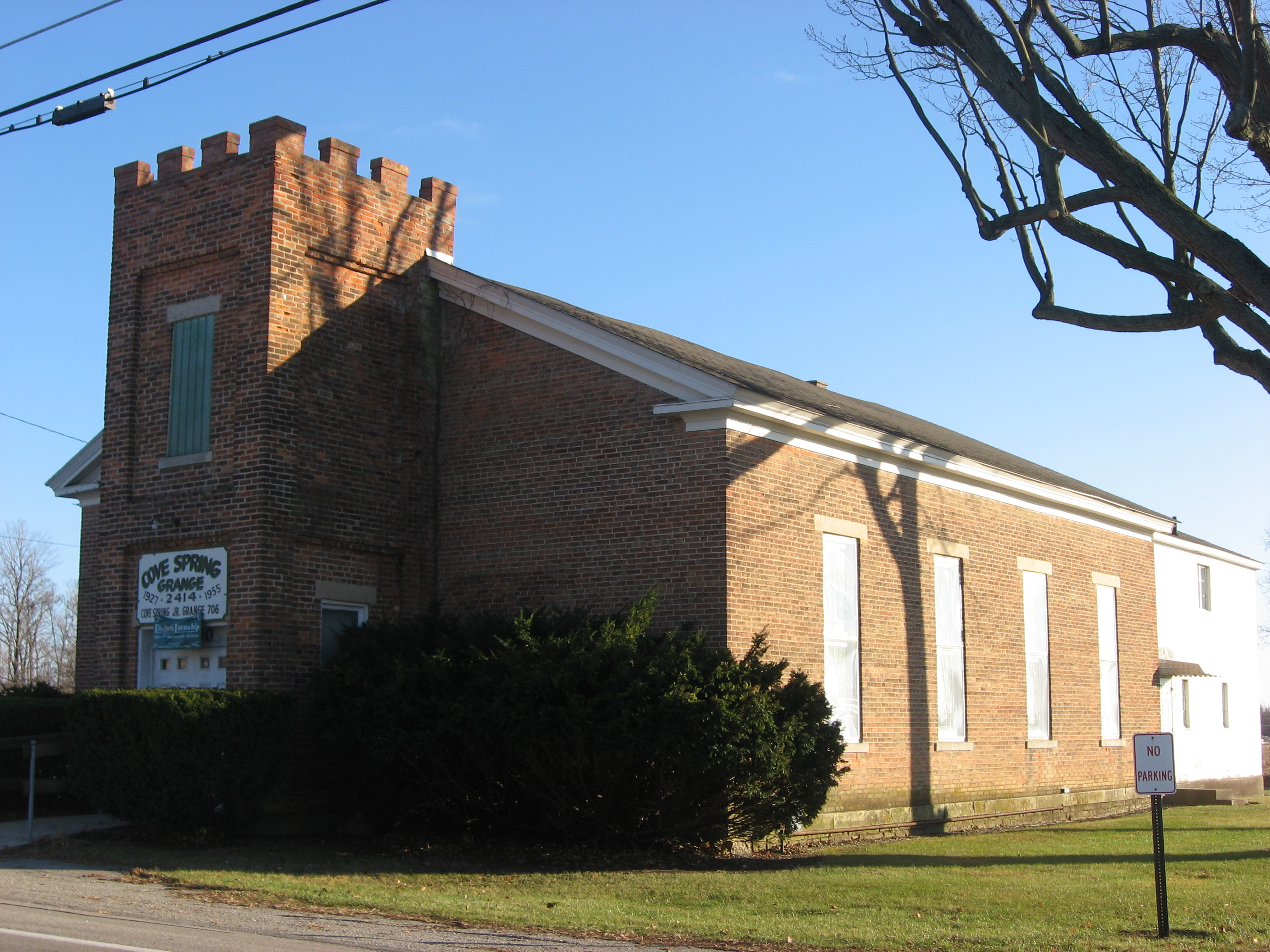
- The Cove Springs Grange, located in the unincorporated community of Alcony

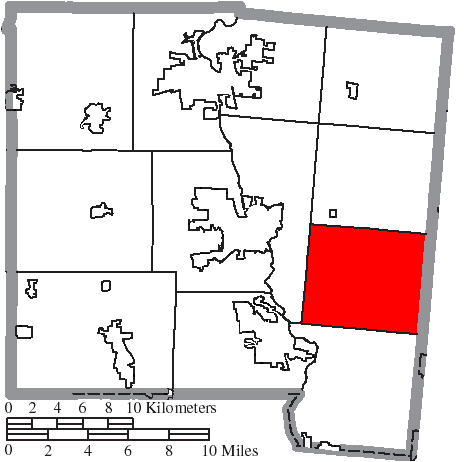
- Location of Elizabeth Township in Miami County
- Coordinates: 40°0′3″N 84°5′48″W
- Country: United States
- State: Ohio
- County: Miami

Area
  - Total: 29.8 sq mi (77.3 km^{2})
  - Land: 29.8 sq mi (77.3 km^{2})
  - Water: 0 sq mi (0.0 km^{2})
- Elevation: 827 ft (252 m)

Population (2020)
  - Total: 1,686
  - Density: 56.5/sq mi (21.8/km^{2})
- Time zone: UTC-5 (Eastern (EST))
  - Summer (DST): UTC-4 (EDT)
- FIPS code: 39-24836
- GNIS feature ID: 1086637

Elizabeth Township is one of the twelve townships of Miami County, Ohio, United States. The 2020 census found 1,686 people in the township.

== Geography ==
Located in the eastern part of the county, it borders the following townships:

- Lostcreek Township - north
- Jackson Township, Champaign County - northeast corner
- Pike Township, Clark County - east
- Bethel Township - south
- Staunton Township - west

No municipalities are located in Elizabeth Township.

== Name and history ==
Statewide, the only other Elizabeth Township is located in Lawrence County.

== Government ==
The township is governed by a three-member board of trustees, who are elected in November of odd-numbered years to a four-year term beginning on the following January 1. Two are elected in the year after the presidential election and one is elected in the year before it. There is also an elected township fiscal officer, who serves a four-year term beginning on April 1 of the year after the election, which is held in November of the year before the presidential election. Vacancies in the fiscal officership or on the board of trustees are filled by the remaining trustees.
