= Sidney High School (Ohio) =

Coordinates: 40°16′43″N 84°10′24″W

Location
- 1215 Campbell Road; Sidney, Ohio 45365; United States

Information
- Type: Public
- Established: 1872
- School district: Sidney City Schools
- Staff: 95
- Grades: 9-12
- Enrollment: 1,000
- Colors: Black and yellow
- Mascot: Yellow Jackets
- Rival: Piqua High School, Troy High School
- Information: (937) 497-2238
- Website: Sidney High School

Sidney High School is a comprehensive, college-prep oriented public high school in Sidney, Ohio, which is located 40 miles (64 km) north of Dayton, Ohio, on Interstate 75. It is the only public high school in the Sidney City Schools district.

Sidney High School average enrollment is approximately 1,000, with approximately 200 students attending the Upper Valley Career Center in Piqua, OH. The average graduating class size is approximately 250 students.

Sidney City Schools offers more than 70 extracurricular activities for students from 6th grade on. Sports include: football; boys & girls soccer; boys & girls basketball; boys baseball; girls fastpitch; boys & girls tennis; co-ed track; co-ed bowling; co-ed swimming; co-ed cross country; girls volleyball; co-ed wrestling; weight lifting; cheerleading; marching band; and golf.

== Athletics ==
Sidney High School is a long time member of the Miami Valley League (MVL). The Yellow Jacket's primary rivals are Piqua High School and Troy High School

=== OHSAA State Championships ===
2020 Boys' Bowling

== Alumni ==
- Warren Davidson, US Congressional Representative (1989)
- Paul Lauterbur, Nobel Prize Winning scientist (1974)
- Lois Lenski, Author (1911)
