= John Randolph of Roanoke =

American politician (1773–1833)

- Portrait by John Wesley Jarvis, c. 1811

8th United States Minister to Russia
- In office May 26, 1830 – September 19, 1830
- President: Andrew Jackson
- Preceded by: Henry Middleton
- Succeeded by: James Buchanan

United States Senator from Virginia
- In office December 26, 1825 – March 3, 1827
- Preceded by: James Barbour
- Succeeded by: John Tyler

Member of the U.S. House of Representatives from Virginia
- In office March 4, 1833 – May 24, 1833
- Preceded by: Thomas T. Bouldin
- Succeeded by: Thomas T. Bouldin
- Constituency: 5th district
- In office March 4, 1827 – March 3, 1829
- Preceded by: George W. Crump
- Succeeded by: Thomas T. Bouldin
- Constituency: 5th district
- In office March 4, 1819 – December 26, 1825
- Preceded by: Archibald Austin
- Succeeded by: George W. Crump
- Constituency: 16th district (1819–23); 5th district (1823–25)
- In office March 4, 1815 – March 3, 1817
- Preceded by: John W. Eppes
- Succeeded by: Archibald Austin
- Constituency: 16th district
- In office March 4, 1799 – March 3, 1813
- Preceded by: Abraham B. Venable
- Succeeded by: John Kerr
- Constituency: 7th district (1799–1803); 15th district (1803–13)

Personal details
- Born: June 2, 1773 "Cawsons" plantation, Prince George County, Colony of Virginia, British America
- Died: May 24, 1833 (aged 59) Philadelphia, Pennsylvania, U.S.
- Resting place: Hollywood Cemetery, Richmond, Virginia
- Party: Democratic-Republican (Tertium Quids)
- Education: College of New Jersey; Columbia College
- Profession: Planter

Portrait by Gilbert Stuart, c. 1804–1805

John Randolph (June 2, 1773 – May 24, 1833), commonly known as John Randolph of Roanoke, (Note: Roanoke refers to Roanoke Plantation in Charlotte County, Virginia, not to the city of the same name.) was a prominent early American planter, and a politician from Virginia, serving in the House of Representatives at various times between 1799 and 1833, and the Senate from 1825 to 1827. He was also Minister to Russia under Andrew Jackson in 1830. After serving as President Thomas Jefferson's unofficial spokesman in the House, he broke with the president in 1805 as a result of what he saw as the dilution of traditional Jeffersonian principles as well as perceived mistreatment during the impeachment of Samuel Chase, in which Randolph served as chief prosecutor. Following this split, Randolph proclaimed himself the leader of the "Old Republicans" or "Tertium Quids", a wing of the Democratic-Republican Party who wanted to restrict the role of the federal government. Specifically, Randolph promoted the Principles of '98, which said that individual states could judge the constitutionality of central government laws and decrees, and could refuse to enforce laws deemed unconstitutional.

Described as a quick-thinking orator with a remarkable wit, he was committed to republicanism and advocated a commercial agrarian society throughout his three decades in Congress. Randolph "attracted great attention from the severity of his invectives, the piquancy of his sarcasms, the piercing intonation of his voice and his peculiarly expressive gesticulation." Randolph's conservative stance, displayed in his arguments against debt and for the rights of the landed, slaveholding gentry, have been attributed to his ties to his family estate and the elitist values of his native Southside Virginia. His belief in the importance of a landed gentry led him to oppose the abolition of entail and primogeniture: "The old families of Virginia will form connections with low people, and sink into the mass of overseers' sons and daughters". Randolph vehemently opposed the War of 1812 and the Missouri Compromise of 1820; he was active in debates about tariffs, manufacturing, and currency. With mixed feelings about slavery, he was one of the founders of the American Colonization Society in 1816, to send free blacks to a colony in Africa. At the same time, he believed that slavery was a necessity in Virginia, saying, "The question of slavery, as it is called, is to us a question of life and death ... You will find no instance in history where two distinct races have occupied the soil except in the relation of master and slave." In addition, Randolph remained dependent on hundreds of slaves to work his tobacco plantation. However, he provided for their manumission and resettlement in the free state of Ohio in his will, providing money for the purchase of land and supplies. They founded Rossville, now part of Piqua, Ohio and Rumley, Ohio.

His supporters admired Randolph's fiery character, and education was one of his passions. On the other hand, others, particularly northern advocates of democracy, mocked Randolph for his eccentricities, as did many Virginians including Thomas Jefferson. He applied rousing methods in electioneering, which he also enjoyed as a hobby. Randolph appealed directly to yeomen, using entertaining and enlightening oratory, sociability, and community of interest, particularly in agriculture. This resulted in an enduring voter attachment to him. His defense of limited government appeals to modern and contemporary conservatives, most notably Russell Kirk, who wrote an influential monograph on Randolph.

Randolph is also remembered as an eccentric character with an ambiguous gender presentation, which became the subject of further speculation once an autopsy on his body revealed underdeveloped male genitalia. He also, apparently, was a descendent of Pocahontas, and self-identified as being of mixed-race ancestry.

== Early life and education ==
Randolph was born at Cawsons (now in Hopewell) in the Colony of Virginia, the son of rich tobacco planter John Randolph (1742–1775) and Frances Bland (1744–1788). His families, the Randolph family of Virginia and the Bland family of Virginia, are both among the prominent First Families of Virginia and often intermarried. His grandfathers were Richard Randolph and Theodorick Bland of Cawsons, who were, respectively, the son and grandson of William Randolph and Mary Isham of Turkey Island. He was the first cousin once removed of both Richard Bland and Peyton Randolph, the two pillars of the First Continental Congress, the nephew of Congressman Theodorick Bland and stepnephew of Thomas Tudor Tucker, a half brother of Henry St. George Tucker, Sr. and Nathaniel Beverley Tucker, and a second cousin of Thomas Jefferson. Jefferson's mother was the daughter of Isham Randolph of Dungeness.

His father died in 1775, when he (the youngest of three brothers, and ultimately the longest-lived) was two years old. Their mother managed the family plantations and waited to remarry until 1778, when she wed St. George Tucker, the son of a prominent planter in Bermuda (where he later took his stepsons to recover their health), who had traveled to Virginia to study law under George Wythe in Williamsburg, was admitted to the Virginia bar in 1774, became well-regarded in his profession – including teaching law at the College of William and Mary – and would become a judge of what later became the Virginia Supreme Court in 1804. His maternal fourth great-grandfather was Richard Bennett of Virginia, elected governor of Virginia colony during the Cromwell Protectorate and a Puritan who in 1672 was converted to the Quaker movement by George Fox.

Randolph's childhood was marked by the abuse he suffered at the hands of his stepfather, who allegedly was attempting to cure the effeminacy of his new wife's son. Randolph was described as "sensitive" and "high-strung".

=== Health issues ===
A genetic aberration — possibly Klinefelter syndrome — left him beardless and with a soprano prepubescent voice throughout his life. Modern science has established that latent pulmonary tuberculosis can sometimes settle in the genital tract and can cause the symptoms and permanent damage that would prevent the onset of puberty. Randolph's brother died of tuberculosis, and it appears that Randolph contracted it as a youth and never went through puberty. He finally died of tuberculosis at age 60, after it broke out into the open. He began to use opium as a way to deal with the extreme pain caused by his lifelong battle with tuberculosis. Contemporary accounts attest to his having had a belligerent and bellicose personality before the onset of any disease.

=== Education ===
First studying under private tutors, Randolph attended Walker Maury's private school. After one of his brothers was disciplined, the Randolph brothers beat Maury and left the boarding school without completing their studies. Their stepfather then sent them to College of New Jersey, and Columbia College, New York City. The Randolph brothers neglected their studies and spent much time in taverns. After failing their courses and running out of money, they returned to Virginia. John later studied law in Philadelphia under his cousin Edmund Randolph, but never practiced. In 1792, his family's wealth and influence gained him admission to the College William and Mary in Williamsburg, Virginia. Convinced that his pronunciations of words were the only correct ones, he insulted fellow student Robert B. for allegedly mispronouncing a word. Randolph refused to apologize and a duel ensued. Randolph soon after left William and Mary, thus ending his formal education.

== Political career ==
In 1798, at the unusually young age of 26, Randolph was elected to the 6th United States Congress. It was said that Randolph's youthful appearance prompted the Speaker of the House, Theodore Sedgwick, to ask Randolph whether he was old enough to be eligible, but that Randolph's reply — "Ask my constituents" — disinclined Sedgwick to pursue the question further. Randolph was re-elected to the six succeeding Congresses, and served from 1799 to 1813. Even though he frequently criticized slavery, he devoted much of his congressional career to defending slavery and Virginia's class of wealthy slaveholders. Randolph also insisted that abolition would be worse for both enslaved blacks and whites. Indeed, Randolph lionized Virginia's wealthy slaveholding class as the rightful rulers of Virginia and the United States, and had great disdain for democracy and the advocates of more democratic government in Virginia and the Union.

Federalist William Plumer of New Hampshire wrote in 1803 of his striking presence:

Mr. Randolph goes to the House booted and spurred, with his whip in hand, in imitation, it is said, of members of the British Parliament. He is a very slight man but of the common stature. At a little distance, he does not appear older than you are; but, upon a nearer approach, you perceive his wrinkles and grey hairs. He is, I believe, about thirty. He is a descendant in the right line from the celebrated Indian Princess, Pochahontas. The Federalists ridicule and affect to despise him; but a despised foe often proves a dangerous enemy. His talents are certainly far above mediocrity. As a popular speaker, he is not inferior to any man in the House. I admire his ingenuity and address; but I dislike his politics.

Randolph was chairman of the Committee on Ways and Means in the Seventh through the Ninth Congresses, acting as the Democratic-Republican Party leader. In 1804, Randolph proposed the ill-fated Mobile Act, which implicitly allowed the President to claim parts of Spanish West Florida for the US. The Act was passed, and Jefferson tried to act on it, but Spain objected vehemently. Jefferson backed down and threw blame on Randolph.

After this, Randolph broke with Jefferson (his cousin). In 1806, Randolph founded the Tertium quids (Latin for "Third things", i.e. neither pro-Jefferson nor Federalist), a breakaway faction of the Democratic-Republican Party. They called for a return to the Principles of 1798 and renounced what it saw as creeping nationalism. The Tertium Quids believed that wealthy slaveholders like themselves were the rightful rulers of Virginia and the nation, and that any movement towards greater democracy would undermine the power and authority of Virginia's slaveholding class.

Although he greatly admired the political ideals of the Revolutionary War generation, Randolph, influenced by Southern anti-Federalism, propounded a version of republicanism that called for the traditional patriarchal society of Virginia's elite slaveholding gentry to preserve social stability with minimal government interference. Randolph was one of the House managers who successfully prosecuted the impeachment trial of John Pickering, judge of the United States District Court for New Hampshire, in January 1804.

Randolph was also a central proponent of impeaching Supreme Court Associate Justice Samuel Chase. Later that same year, Chase was impeached but acquitted. Randolph again served as a House manager, and critics complained that he mismanaged the prosecution. In June 1807, Randolph was the foreman of the grand jury in Richmond, which was considering the indictment of Aaron Burr and others for treason. By the end of the review, he was angry with Thomas Jefferson for supporting General James Wilkinson, Burr's chief accuser. He considered Wilkinson less than a reputable and honorable person.

In 1811, a group of war hawks who advocated for an American war with Britain were elected to Congress. Randolph was one of the few congressmen who opposed a war with Britain, perceiving calls for such a conflict as "foolhardy and driven by land hunger rather than violations of American rights." On December 11, 1811, he gave a speech in Congress which Randolph argued:

If you go to war it will not be for the protection of, or defense of your maritime rights. Gentlemen from the North have been taken up some high mountain and shown all the kingdoms of the earth; and Canada seems tempting to their sights... Agrarian cupidity, not maritime rights, urges the war. Ever since the report of the Committee on Foreign Relations came into the House, we have heard but one word like the whip-poor-will, but one eternal monotonous tone—Canada! Canada! Canada!... It is to acquire a prepondering northern influence that you are to launch into war.

However, Randolph was unsuccessful in countering the war hawks, who secured an American declaration of war against Britain in 1812, initiating the War of 1812. He responded by stating in Congress "Gentlemen, you have made war. You have finished the ruin of our country. And before you conquer Canada your idol (Napoleon) will cease to distract the world and the Capitol will be a ruin." Randolph's words would prove prophetic, as British forces burned the Capitol in 1814.

Defeated for re-election in 1812 due to his opposition to war with Britain, Randolph was elected in 1814 and 1816. He skipped a term, then was again elected and served from 1819 until his resignation in 1825. During the Missouri Crisis, Randolph emerged as an outspoken defender of the slaveholding gentry and a critic of democracy, even though he repeatedly insisted that he hated slavery. Randolph was asked to be the Democratic-Republican Party candidate for president in the 1824 presidential election. He declined this offer; the election was won by John Quincy Adams. Randolph was appointed to the Senate in December 1825 to fill a vacancy, and he served until 1827. During his time in the Senate, his pro-Adams colleagues, annoyed by the bitterness of his invective, sometimes foreshortened his speeches "by severally quitting their seats when he was speaking to an extent sufficient to leave the Senate without a quorum."

In 1825, he spoke for several days in opposition to a series of measures proposed by President Adams. Randolph argued these measures would give advantage to the emerging industrial powers of New England at the expense of the Southern states. This series of speeches was the first Senate filibuster. With his Senate term ending, Randolph did not seek re-election. Instead he was again elected US Representative in 1826, and again became Chairman of the Committee on Ways and Means.

Portrait by Chester Harding, c. 1829–1830

John Randolph offered many pro-slavery speeches over his long career in Congress. He mocked universal emancipation as an unreliable fantasy. Speaking about Cuba, Randolph said "It is unquestionable but this invasion will be made with this principle – this genius of universal emancipation – the sweeping anathema against the white population... And then, sir, what is the position of the southern United States?" If we should accede, "we should deserve to have negroes for our taskmasters, and for the husbands of our wives." Randolph retired from the US House in 1828. He was a member of the Virginia Constitutional Convention of 1829-1830 as a delegate from Charlotte County. He was appointed United States Minister to Russia by President Andrew Jackson and served from May to September 1830, when he resigned for health reasons. In 1832, he was again elected US Representative, and served until his death in 1833.

== General Thomas Marsh Forman ==
Between 1807 and 1826, Randolph regularly wrote to General Thomas Marsh Forman. In his correspondence, it was revealed he had an affection for Joseph Randolph Bryan and Thomas Marsh Bryan Forman, two sons of his "dearest friend", Joseph Bryan.

== Death, legacy and honors ==
Randolph died of Tuberculosis in Philadelphia on May 24, 1833. He never married. Randolph is buried in the Hollywood Cemetery, Richmond, Virginia. His Virginia home, Roanoke Plantation, remains standing today, and was listed on the National Register of Historic Places in 1973.

- Randolph was elected a member of the American Antiquarian Society in 1815.

A modern conservative political group, the John Randolph Club, is named after Randolph. His defense of limited government appeals to modern and contemporary conservatives, most notably Russell Kirk (1918–1994).

Places named in his honor include:

- Randolph-Macon College and Randolph College.
- Randolph County, Arkansas, Randolph County, Georgia and Randolph County, Missouri
- The World War II Liberty Ship SS John Randolph
- Randolph-Henry High School, in Charlotte Court House, Virginia was named in his, and Patrick Henry's honor. Established 1938.

== Personality, eccentricity and outsider status ==
Despite being a Virginia gentleman, one of the great orators in the history of Caroline, and House leader, Randolph after five years of leadership became, by 1803, a permanent outsider. His personal eccentricities may have been made worse by his lifelong ill health, heavy drinking, and occasional use of opium. According to Bill Kauffman, Randolph was "a habitual opium user [and] a bachelor who seems to have nurtured a crush on Andrew Jackson."

In one letter Randolph wrote, he portrayed Jackson as Alexander the Great and himself as Hephaestion, who some historians believed was the king's lover. Randolph said of his relation with Jackson "I trust that I am something better than his minion (the nature of their connection, if I forget it not, was Greek love)," implying a kind of homosexuality between the two men.

John Greenleaf Whittier's poem "Randolph of Roanoke," written after the Virginian had become a symbol of "slave power," may capture his strange brilliance:

Mirth, sparkling like a diamond shower,
From lips of lifelong sadness;
Clear picturings of majestic thought
Upon a ground of madness
While others hailed in distant skies
Our eagle's dusky pinion,
He only saw the mountain bird
Stoop o'er his Old Dominion!
All parties feared him; each in turn
Beheld its schemes disjointed,
At right or left his fatal glance
And spectral finger pointed.

In March 1826, Randolph made a Senate speech in which he described the arrangement by which John Quincy Adams became president in 1825 and Henry Clay became Adams's Secretary of State as the actions of the "puritan (Adams) with the blackleg (Clay)". Clay was under the impression that Randolph had waived congressional immunity before his speech; insulted by Randolph's description of him, he challenged Randolph to a duel. Randolph had in fact not waived immunity, but rather than appear dishonorable by making this known, he accepted Clay's challenge. During the preliminary activities, Randolph asserted that Clay had no right to issue a challenge over political remarks made on the U.S. Senate floor. Because of this view, Randolph announced his intention not to fire at Clay. On April 8, they met on the Virginia side of the Potomac River. During their first volley, Randolph shot wildly and Clay missed. During their second, Randolph fired into the air, clearly signalling that he would not participate. Clay then ended the duel by approaching Randolph and expressing hope that Randolph was uninjured. Clay's bullet had torn Randolph's outer clothing, and he replied good-naturedly "You owe me a coat, Mr. Clay". Civil relations between Randolph and Clay were restored. As Martin Van Buren later wrote:

He [Randolph] insisted that he at no time intended to take Mr. Clay's life and assigned as a reason his respect for Mrs. Clay and his unwillingness to make her unhappy, but he admitted that, after certain occurrences, he had determined to wound him in the leg — his failure to accomplish which design he attributed to an anxiety to avoid the kneepan, to hit which he regarded as murder!

Except for this incident, Randolph generally saved his bellicosity for the floor of Congress. He routinely dressed in a flashy manner, often accompanied by his slaves and his hunting dogs. "[W]hen Clay had set about making the speakership a position of true power upon his first election to that post in 1811, he had unceremoniously ordered Randolph to remove his dog from the House floor—something no previous Speaker had dared to do."

Randolph had an intense dislike for Rep. Willis Alston and had a pitched fight with him in a Washington boarding house. Heated words led to the two throwing tableware at each other. Six years later, they fought again in a stairwell at the House after Alston loudly referred to Randolph as a "puppy". Randolph beat Alston bloody with his cane and the two had to be separated by other congressmen. Randolph was fined $20 for this breach of the peace.

Nonetheless, Randolph maintained many friendships which crossed political party lines. As an example, he remained close with Federalist Congressman Harmanus Bleecker of Albany, New York. Bleecker and Randolph exchanged portraits as a token of their mutual esteem, and each displayed in his home the portrait of the other.

=== Religious conversion ===
Randolph was raised and remained within the Episcopal Church. Although he went through a phase of youthful irreligion, in 1818 he had a crisis ending in a conversion experience, which he recounted in letters to several friends.

Randolph's life thereafter was marked with piety. For example, he wrote to John Brockenbrough that he was restrained from taking communion "by the fear of eating and drinking unrighteously." Thus, the executors of Randolph's last will and testament (described below) included Virginia's bishop, William Meade (who had freed his slaves years earlier, but would by the end of his life during the American Civil War become a defender of the "peculiar institution").

=== Slavery ===
Together with Justice Bushrod Washington and his former student Henry Clay, Randolph was among the founders of the American Colonization Society (ACS) in 1816. It began as a collaboration of slaveholders and abolitionists that planned to transport and resettle free blacks in a colony in Africa (this territory became Liberia). Like some other slaveholders, Randolph had long been opposed to slavery in theory. Also, his eldest brother, Richard Randolph, had freed slaves in his will, and his widow Judith fought to implement that provision, which led to the founding of the free black community of Israel Hill on the former Randolph estate in Prince Edward County, Virginia. In the two decades after the Revolutionary War, so many planters freed slaves that the proportion of free blacks in Virginia increased from less than one percent in 1782 to 13.5 percent in 1810.

Nearly two decades after Richard's death, in 1819, John Randolph also wrote a will providing for the manumission of his slaves after his death. He wrote, "I give and bequeath to all my slaves their freedom, heartily regretting that I have ever been the owner of one." The will made provision for settling the manumitted slaves on their own land in free territory (since these freed men unlike Richard's could not date their freedom before Virginia's law requiring freed blacks to leave the Commonwealth). Another will made in 1821 provided that each slave above the age of 40 was to receive 10 acres (4.0 ha) of land. Although the will was challenged in the courts, his slaves were ultimately ruled to be free. In 1846, 383 former "Randolph Slaves" arrived in Cincinnati. Local farmers in the Ohio county where Randolph's executor had purchased 3200 acres for them prevented the freedpeople from settling there. Many of them ultimately settled in Miami and Shelby Counties at places such as Rossville near Piqua, Ohio, of which only the community cemetery remains.

== Electoral history ==
- 1799; Randolph was elected to the U.S. House of Representatives with 40.54% of the vote, defeating Federalists Powhatan Bolling and Clement Carington.
- 1801; Randolph was reelected unopposed.
- 1823; Randolph was reelected unopposed.
- 1825; Randolph was reelected unopposed.
- 1827; Randolph was reelected unopposed.
- 1833; Randolph was reelected unopposed.

== Cultural depictions ==
Portrayed by Melvyn Douglas in the 1936 film The Gorgeous Hussy.

Portrayed by Edwin Maxwell in the 1942 film Ten Gentlemen from West Point.

Edgar Allan Poe in "The Facts in the Case of M. Valdemar" (1845) states that the fatally consumptive M. Valdemar "is (or was) particularly noticeable for the extreme sparseness of his person—his lower limbs much resembling those of John Randolph". Poe might have seen Randolph while living in Richmond, Virginia, from 1820 to 1827.

== Ancestry ==
Ancestors of John Randolph of Roanoke

8. William Randolph I
4. Richard Randolph
9. Mary Isham
2. John Randolph
10. John Bolling
5. Jane Bolling
11. Mary Kennon
1. John Randolph of Roanoke
12. Richard Bland
6. Theodorick Bland of Cawsons
13. Elizabeth Randolph
3. Frances Bland
14. Drury Bolling
7. Frances Elizabeth Bolling
15. Elizabeth Meriwether

== See also ==
- List of members of the United States Congress who died in office (1790–1899)
- List of United States political appointments across party lines
- Virginia Constitutional Convention of 1829–1830

== Works ==
- Randolph, John. Letters of John Randolph, to a Young Relative, 1834, 254 pp. (Available online.)
- Randolph, John. Collected letters of John Randolph of Roanoke to Dr. John Brockenbrough, 1812–1833, edited by Kenneth Shorey; foreword by Russell Kirk, Piscataway, NJ: Transaction Publishers, 1988.

== Bibliography ==
- Adams, Henry. John Randolph (1882); New Edition with Primary Documents and Introduction by Robert McColley, 1996, ISBN 1-56324-653-8; negative assessment. (Available online.)
- Bruce, William Cabell. John Randolph of Roanoke, 1773–1833; a biography based largely on new material, in 2 volumes; New York, London: G. P. Putnam's Sons, 1922 (2nd revised edition in 1 volume 1939, reprinted New York, Octagon Books, 1970); exhaustive details. (Available online: Vol. I, Vol. II.)
- Dawidoff, Robert. The Education of John Randolph, New York: Norton, 1979. ISBN 0-393-01242-5
- Devanny, John F., Jr. "'A Loathing of Public Debt, Taxes, and Excises': The Political Economy of John Randolph of Roanoke," Virginia Magazine of History and Biography 2001 109(4): pp 387–416.
- Garland, Hugh A. The Life of John Randolph of Roanoke; New York: Appleton & Company, 1851. (Available online: Vol. I, Vol. II.)
- Johnson, David. John Randolph of Roanoke (Louisiana State University Press; 2012) 352 pages; detailed scholarly biography
- Kauffman, Bill. Ain't My America: The Long, Noble History of Anti-War Conservatism and Middle-American Anti-Imperialism, Metropolitan, 2008.
- Kirk, Russell. Randolph of Roanoke; a study in conservative thought, (1951), 186 pp. Short essay; recent editions include many letters. (Available online.)
- John Randolph of Roanoke: a study in American politics, with selected speeches and letters, 4th ed., Indianapolis, IN : Liberty Fund, 1997, 588 pp. ISBN 0-86597-150-1; focus on JR's political philosophy
- May, Gregory. A Madman's Will: John Randolph, 400 Slaves, and the Mirage of Freedom (New York: Liveright, 2023).
- Risjord, Norman K. The Old Republicans: Southern Conservatism in the Age of Jefferson (1965); the standard history of the Randolph faction.
- Tate, Adam L. "Republicanism and Society: John Randolph of Roanoke, Joseph Glover Baldwin, and the Quest for Social Order." Virginia Magazine of History and Biography 2003 111(3): 263–298.
- Weaver, Richard M. "Two Types of American Individualism," Modern Age 1963 7(2): 119–134; compares Randolph with Henry David Thoreau online edition

U.S. House of Representatives
Preceded by Abraham B. Venable	Member of the U.S. House of Representatives from Virginia's 7th congressional district 1799–1803	Succeeded by Joseph Lewis Jr.
Preceded by John Dawson	Member of the U.S. House of Representatives from Virginia's 15th congressional district 1803–1813	Succeeded by John Kerr
Preceded by John W. Eppes	Member of the U.S. House of Representatives from Virginia's 16th congressional district 1815–1817	Succeeded by Archibald Austin
Preceded by Archibald Austin	Member of the U.S. House of Representatives from Virginia's 16th congressional district 1819–1823	Succeeded by James Stephenson
Preceded by John Floyd	Member of the U.S. House of Representatives from Virginia's 5th congressional district 1823–1825	Succeeded by George W. Crump
Preceded by George W. Crump	Member of the U.S. House of Representatives from Virginia's 5th congressional district 1827–1829	Succeeded by Thomas T. Bouldin
Preceded by Thomas T. Bouldin	Member of the U.S. House of Representatives from Virginia's 5th congressional district 1833	Succeeded by Thomas T. Bouldin
U.S. Senate
Preceded by James Barbour	U.S. senator (Class 1) from Virginia; 1825–1827; Served alongside: Littleton W. Tazewell	Succeeded by John Tyler
Diplomatic posts
Preceded by Henry Middleton	United States Ambassador to Russia; 1830	Succeeded by James Buchanan
