= Ohio State Route 201 =

State highway in western Ohio, US

State Route 201

Route information
- Maintained by ODOT
- Length: 21.69 mi (34.91 km)
- Existed: 1923–present

Major junctions
- South end: SR 4 in Dayton
- I-70 in Huber Heights; US 40 near Huber Heights
- North end: SR 55 near Casstown

Location
- Country: United States
- State: Ohio
- Counties: Miami, Montgomery

Highway system
- Ohio State Highway System; Interstate; US; State; Scenic
← SR 200	→ SR 202

State Route 201 (SR 201) is a 21.69-mile (34.91 km) long north–south state highway in the western portion of the U.S. state of Ohio. The southern terminus of SR 201 is at an interchange with the SR 4 freeway in Dayton. Its northern terminus is at a T-intersection with SR 55 approximately 3.25 miles (5.23 km) east of Casstown.

== Route description ==
Along its path, SR 201 passes through the eastern portion of Montgomery County and the eastern portion of Miami County. There are no segments of SR 201 that are included as a part of the National Highway System.

SR 201 begins in Dayton, within the same interchange complex that also features the southern terminus of SR 202. Northbound SR 204 begins on a ramp from SR 4 to Troy Street and Valley Street. At the bottom of the ramp, SR 201 reaches Troy Street, also designated as SR 202. SR 201 travels east along Herman Street before turning north onto Valley Street. The southbound direction of SR 201, designated SR 201-D by the Ohio Department of Transportation (ODOT), traveled south along Valley Street from the Herman Street intersection, intersected Troy Street (also the southern terminus of SR 202), then traveled north on Keowee Street before turning left onto the ramp to southbound SR 4 ending at the ramp's merge with the freeway.

SR 201 follows Valley Street until the intersection with Brandt Street, and then follows Brandt Street northward toward Riverside. After entering Riverside, Brandt Street changes its name to Brandt Pike. SR 201 continues as Brandt Pike (even as it again passes inside Dayton city limits) through Huber Heights until it reaches the unincorporated community of Brandt in Bethel Township, Miami County. From there it loses its alternative name and continues northward, ending near Casstown, at the intersection with SR 55.

The portion of SR 201 between Chambersburg Road and Taylorsville Road in Huber Heights is designated "U.S.M.C. Lance Corporal Dustin R. Fitzgerald 'Dusty' Memorial Highway", in honor of a Wayne High School graduate who died on August 18, 2004, from injuries sustained in a non-combat related vehicle accident in Anbar Province, Iraq.

== History ==
The SR 201 designation was applied in 1923. It was originally routed from its southern terminus in Dayton to its junction with U.S. Route 40 (US 40) in Brandt. SR 201 was extended to the north in 1937, routed from US 40 to SR 55.

c. 2015, SR 201's southern terminus was located in Downtown Dayton. It began at the intersection of Third Street and Patterson Boulevard (with Patterson Boulevard carrying SR 4 and this point also marking the former southern terminus of SR 202) and followed Patterson Boulevard north, First Street east, and Keowee Street north across the Mad River. The three state routes would turn onto Valley Street where SR 202 split off the concurrency at Troy Street, SR 4 at the ramps to the freeway, SR 201 continuing on the route it travels today. The truncation of SR 201 occurred at the same time as the relocation of SR 4 out of Downtown Dayton onto the US 35 and Interstate 75 freeways.

== Future ==
In December 2023, ODOT revealed that it planned to replace the current flashing traffic-light-controlled intersection of SR 201 and SR 571 in Bethel Township, Miami County with a single-lane roundabout, pending funding. This safety improvement was prompted by a March 2023 incident in which a semi-trailer crashed into a house near the junction, resulting in significant damage to, and eventual removal of the house. The homeowner reported that the house had been struck twice in the 1960s and 1970s, with heavy damage in 1982; an additional collision, without significant injury, took place there in December 2023.

== Major intersections ==
County	Location	mi	km	Destinations	Notes
Montgomery	Dayton	0.00– 0.32	0.00– 0.51	SR 4 to I-75 – Springfield, Toledo, Cincinnati	Interchange; access to SR 4 southbound via SR 201-D
Montgomery	Dayton	0.17	0.27	SR 202 north (Troy Street)	Southern terminus of SR 202 at SR 201-D (Valley Street)
Montgomery	Huber Heights	8.10– 8.17	13.04– 13.15	I-70 – Columbus, Indianapolis	Exit 38 off of I-70, a diamond interchange
Miami	Bethel Township	10.75	17.30	US 40 (National Road) – Springfield, Brandt, Vandalia	
Miami	Bethel Township	13.33	21.45	SR 571	
Miami	Lostcreek Township	18.34	29.52	SR 41 – Troy, Springfield	
Miami	Lostcreek Township	21.69	34.91	SR 55 – Casstown, Christiansburg	
1.000 mi = 1.609 km; 1.000 km = 0.621 mi
