= Randolph Freedpeople =

Former slaves of John Randolph of Roanoke

The Randolph Freedpeople, also called the Randolph Slaves, were 383 slaves who were manumitted in the will of their master, John Randolph of Roanoke.

== History ==
=== Wills of John Randolph ===
John Randolph was an American politician who owned 383 slaves to manage his 6000-acre plantation. He wrote three separate wills in 1819, 1821, and 1832. The first two wills directed his executor to free the people he enslaved and purchase land to resettle them outside Virginia (as Virginia law required). The third will freed none of Randolph's slaves and directed his executor to sell most of them. Randolph rejected the third will on his deathbed. When Randolph died in 1833, his family contested the wills. Twelve years later, the court ruled that Randolph's 1821 will was valid. In this document, Randolph had written:

"I give and bequeath to all my slaves their freedom, heartily regretting that I have ever been the owner of one."

He also had set aside 8,000USD to buy land for the freed slaves to live on. Following the 1845 court decision, Randolph's executor, Judge William Leigh, purchased about 3200 acres in Mercer County, Ohio.

=== Relocation ===
The Randolph Freedpeople left for Ohio in June 1846. Accompanied by a 16-wagon convoy, they walked to Kanawha, West Virginia. They camped along the side of the road in tents. From Kanawha, the group took a steamboat to Cincinnati, arriving about a month after they began their journey. In Cincinnati, they boarded three canal boats to ascend the Miami-Erie Canal toward New Bremen in Mercer County.

An armed mob of German settlers assembled at New Bremen stopped the Randolph Freedpeople from going to their land and forced them to return down the canal. Mercer County settlers also published resolutions against the settlement of Black people in the county. One of these read:

"Resolved. That we will not live among Negroes, as we have settled here first, we have fully determined that we will resist the settlement of blacks and mulattoes in this country to the full extent of our means, the bayonet not excepted."

Randolph's executor sold the 3200 acres, recouping an investment of 32,000USD (equal to 1,120,000USD in 2024). It is unknown what became of this money, as all records were destroyed in Confederate burning of Richmond, Virginia in April 1865. At the time, the Black Laws of 1804 and 1807 required all black people entering Ohio to post a 500USD bond (17,500USD in 2024). Period newspaper accounts and oral history suggest that some of the money was spent on purchasing hundreds of such bonds, which were probably never repaid.

The Randolph Freedpeople ultimately dispersed and set up communities throughout Miami and Shelby counties. One of these communities was in Rossville. On 18 February 1857, William Rial, one of the Freedpeople, bought a plot from landowner W.W. McFarland, founding Randolph Settlement. Randolph Settlement eventually became the site of African Jackson Cemetery.

=== Reunions and lawsuit ===
In July 1900, the surviving Freedpeople held a reunion at Midway Park in which they formed the Randolph Ex-Slaves Association. 62 of the original Virginian slaves attended, known as "Old Dominions", as well as the "Buckeyes", those from Ohio. Reunions of the Old Dominions were then held annually from 1900 to 1906; anywhere from 100 to 300 people attended.

In 1907, 170 Freedpeople filed lawsuits to obtain compensation for the land in Mercer County that had been purchased for them, arguing that Randolph's executor had been given no stipulation in the will to sell the land. The Mercer County Common Pleas Court ruled that no compensation could be awarded as the statute of limitations, 21 years, had expired. The case lasted ten years and went all the way to the Supreme Court of Ohio, which affirmed the decision of the lower court.

== Legacy ==
In 2017, in the city of Piqua a drive-through was converted into an information center about the Randolph Freedpeople. The dedication ceremony and opening took place on 16 July of the same year; during the ceremony, a minister washed the feet of Kazy Hinds, who was mayor at the time, as a symbol of unity.

In 2018, Piqua Public Library displayed "Freed Will: The Randolph Freedpeople from Slavery to Settlement", a traveling display by the National Afro-American Museum & Cultural Center in conjunction with Ohio History Connection.
