= Fishburg, Ohio =

Extinct town

Coordinates: 39°50′30″N 84°8′24″W

Fishburg is an extinct town in Montgomery County, in the U.S. state of Ohio. The exact location of the town is unknown to the GNIS.

== History ==
Fishburg developed around a toll gate on the State Route 202 (Old Troy Pike). A post office called Fishburgh was established in 1858, and closed in 1859. It lay within Wayne Township, which incorporated as the city of Huber Heights in 1981.
