= Roanoke Plantation =

Historic house in Virginia, United States

- U.S. National Register of Historic Places
- Virginia Landmarks Register
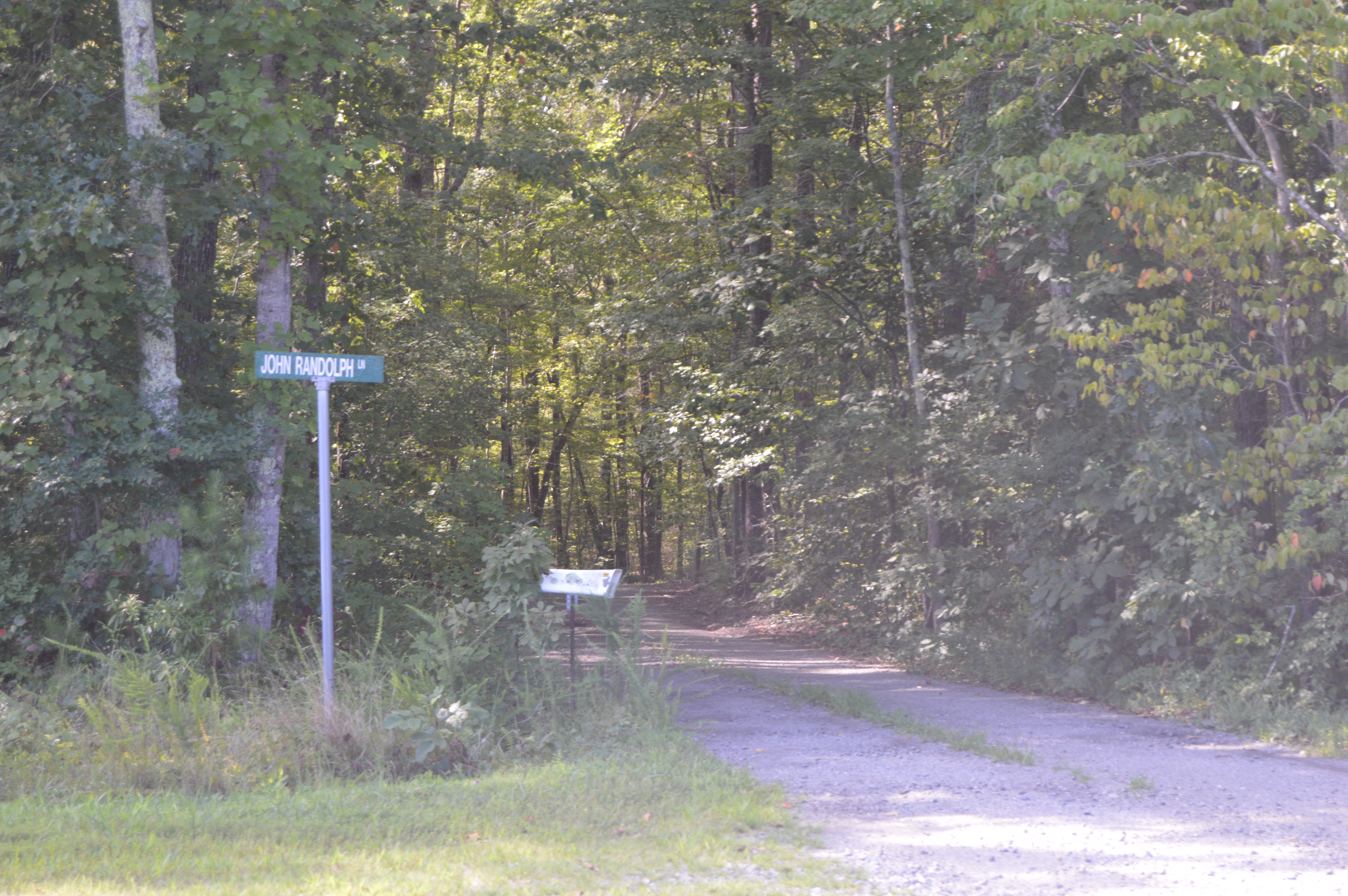
- Entrance to the property

- Location within Virginia Location within the United States
- Location: W of Saxe off VA 746, near Saxe, Virginia
- Coordinates: 36°54′45″N 78°42′50″W
- Area: 926 acres (375 ha)
- NRHP reference No.: 73002002
- VLR No.: 019-0029

Significant dates
- Added to NRHP: April 11, 1973
- Designated VLR: September 19, 1972

Roanoke Plantation is a historic plantation house located near Saxe, Charlotte County, Virginia. The property includes two cottages and a smokehouse. The first cottage is a simple one-story, three-bay structure with exterior-end brick chimneys. It has a steep gable roof. The second cottage is a two-room, gable-end-front frame structure. It was the home of U.S. Congressman and Senator John Randolph (1773–1833).

A group of more than 300 enslaved men, women, and children, known as the Randolph Freedpeople were manumitted their freedom in Senator Randolph's will and were to inherit thousands of acres of fertile farmland in Mercer County, Ohio. Upon his death in 1833, his will was contested, and the plantation workers did not gain their freedom for another 13 years. Once they were finally free, they first attempted to relocate to Mercer County, Ohio where land had been bought for them by the provisions of the will and included at least ten acres of land for every man over 40 years of age. Armed, racist white settlers refused them. The freedmen would ultimately scatter and settle into smaller communities across Ohio. Notable descendants include James P. Humphrey, Sidney's first black mayor.

It was listed on the National Register of Historic Places in 1973.
