= Lena, Ohio =

Unincorporated community in Ohio, U.S.

Coordinates: 40°08′27″N 84°01′56″W

Lena is an unincorporated community in Miami County, in the U.S. state of Ohio.

== History ==
Lena was originally called Elizabethtown, and under the latter name was laid out in 1830, and named for Elizabeth Robbins, the wife of a first settler. Another former variant name was Allen's, after Sylvanus Allen, a local postmaster. A post office called Allens was established in 1830, the name was changed to Lena in 1883, and the post office closed in 1914.

== Notable person ==
- A. B. Graham, an Ohio State University professor, was born near Lena in 1868.
