= Garland, Ohio =

Unincorporated community in Ohio, U.S.

Coordinates: 39°56′05″N 84°22′10″W

Garland is an unincorporated community in Miami County, in the U.S. state of Ohio.

== History ==
A post office called Garland was established in 1891, and remained in operation until 1905. In 1906, Garland had about 50 inhabitants.
