= Favorite Stove =

American manufacturer

Favorite Stove & Range Company
- Company type: Private company
- Industry: Metalwork
- Founded: c. 1882 (In 1887 moved to Piqua, Ohio)
- Founder: W K Boal
- Defunct: 1935
- Fate: Liqidation
- Successor: The Favorite Stove Company until 1958
- Headquarters: Piqua, Ohio, United States
- Area served: United States
- Products: Stoves
- Owner: Stanhope Boal
- Number of employees: 300 (1886)

The Favorite Stove & Range Company was an American manufacturer from the late 19th to the mid-20th centuries.

In 1887 the Favorite Stove & Range Company moved to Piqua, Ohio from Cincinnati, Ohio. The firm became Piqua's largest manufacturer. The company was also the first new business to be brought to Piqua by the Piqua Board of Trade.

The factory was built on the south end of the Hydraulic Canal on what is now South College Street at South Street. The eight acres (3.2 hectares) factory site was bounded by College, Young, Weber and South Streets. By 1896, the firm had over three hundred employees and was producing over fifty thousand stoves a year. The death of owner Stanhope Boal in 1933 and the devastation of the Great Depression led to the company's liquidation in 1935. A portion of the firm remained in business under the name The Favorite Stove Company, producing furnaces and stove parts. The firm suspended operations for the final time in 1958.
