= Alcony, Ohio =

Unincorporated community in Ohio, U.S.

Coordinates: 40°00′41″N 84°03′29″W

Alcony is an unincorporated community in Miami County, in the U.S. state of Ohio.

== History ==
Alcony was laid out in 1858. A post office called Alcony was established in 1868, and remained in operation until 1920. A variant name was Miami City.
