= Frederick, Ohio =

Unincorporated community in Ohio, U.S.

Coordinates: 39°55′32″N 84°16′29″W

Frederick is an unincorporated community in Miami County, in the U.S. state of Ohio.

== History ==
Former variant names of Frederick were Fredericktown and Fidelity. A post office called Fidelity was established in 1849, and remained in operation until 1907. Frederick was named for Frederick Yount, a pioneer settler.
