= Brandt, Ohio =

- Census-designated place
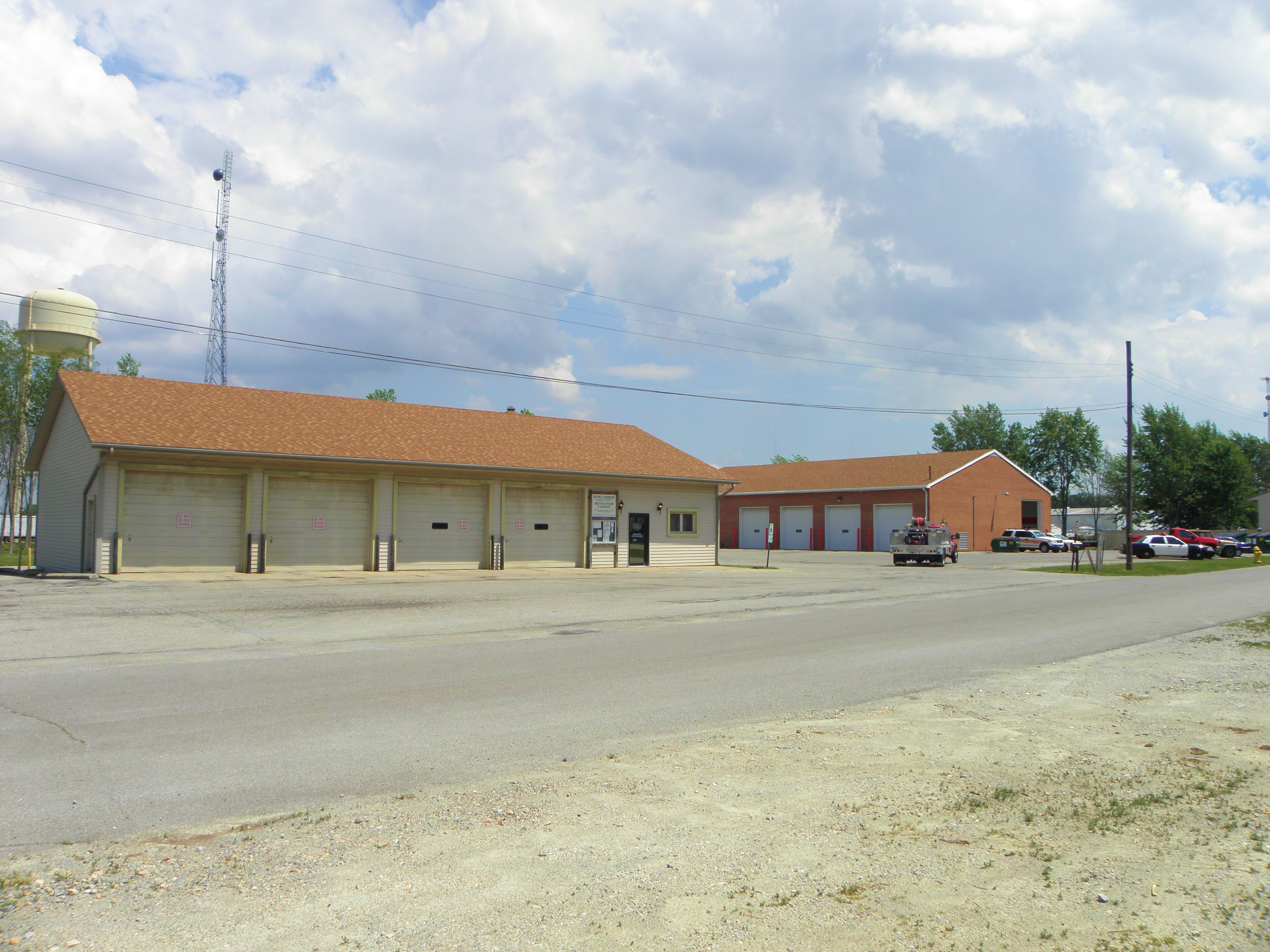
- Bethel Township administration buildings and fire station, Brandt, Ohio

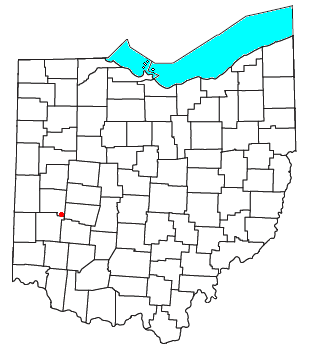
- Location in Ohio
- Coordinates: 39°54′10″N 84°05′27″W
- Country: United States
- State: Ohio
- County: Miami
- Township: Bethel

Area
  - Total: 0.97 sq mi (2.5 km^{2})
  - Land: 0.97 sq mi (2.5 km^{2})
  - Water: 0.0 sq mi (0 km^{2})
- Elevation: 991 ft (302 m)

Population (2020)
  - Total: 282
  - Density: 291.3/sq mi (112.5/km^{2})
- Time zone: UTC-5 (Eastern (EST))
  - Summer (DST): UTC-4 (EDT)
- ZIP Codes: 45371 (Tipp City); 45344 (New Carlisle)
- FIPS code: 39-08308
- GNIS feature ID: 2812835

Brandt is an unincorporated community and census-designated place in southern Bethel Township, Miami County, Ohio, United States. Brandt is part of the Dayton Metropolitan Statistical Area. The population was 282 at the 2020 census. The Bethel Township Administration Facility is located in Brandt.

== History ==
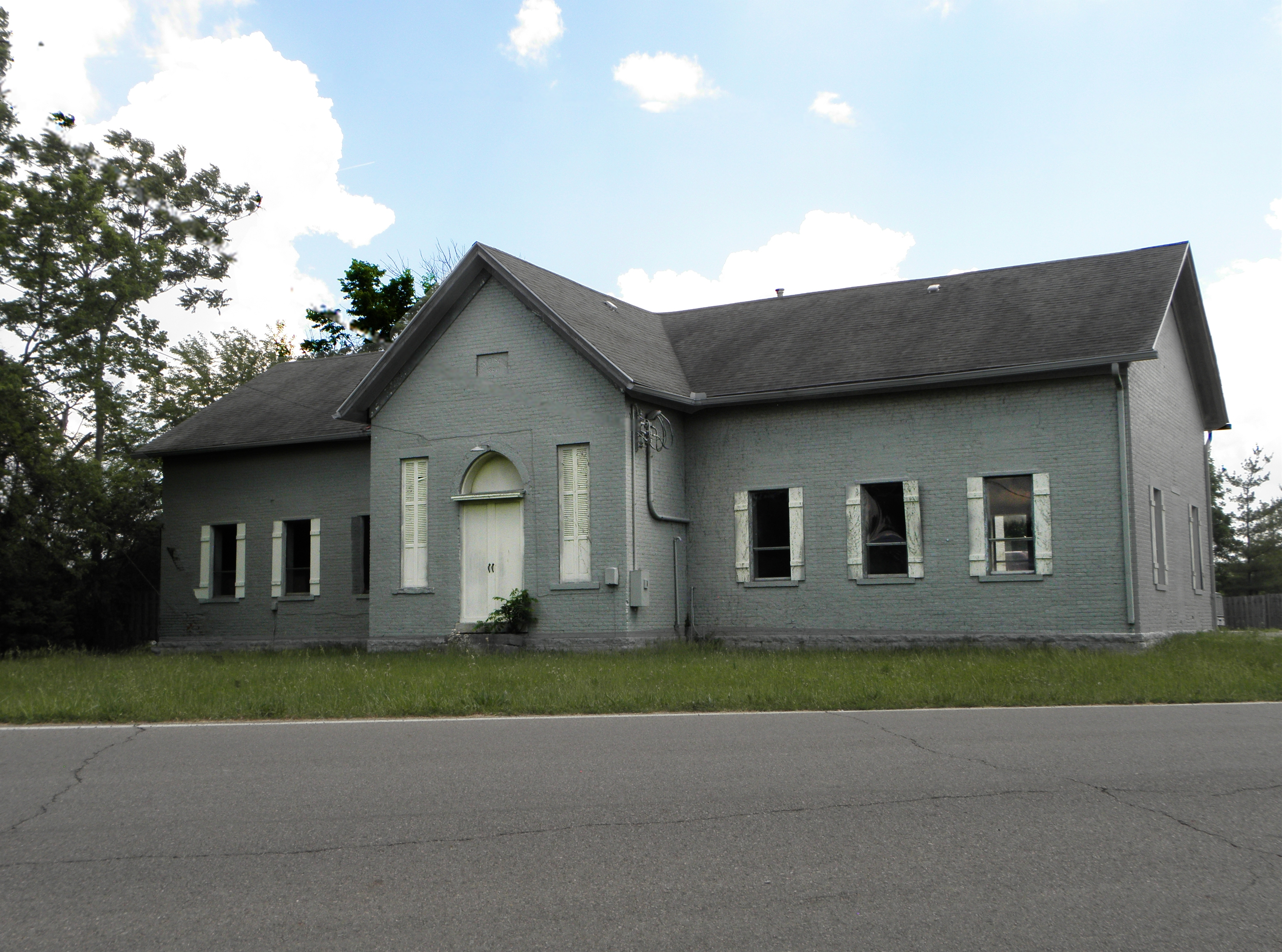
Brandt School in 2015

Brandt formed on the National Road (today U.S. Route 40) as a stop for travelers on the road and for its toll-takers. It was laid out in 1839 by the Voorhis brothers. A toll gate was located at the east end of Brandt where US 40 and State Route 201 intersect today. Toll-takers were appointed by the governor and earned $30 a month.

Brandt School, constructed 1890, still stands on Third Street in the village.

== Geography ==
Brandt is in southeastern Miami County, in the southern part of Bethel Township. It is 12 miles (19 km) northeast of Dayton and 13 miles (21 km) southeast of Troy, the Miami county seat. U.S. Route 40 passes through the center of the community, leading east 15 miles (24 km) to Springfield and west 8 miles (13 km) to Vandalia. Ohio State Route 201 crosses US 40 on the east side of Brandt, leading south 4 miles (6 km) into Huber Heights and north 11 miles (18 km) to State Route 55 near Casstown.

According to the U.S. Census Bureau, the Brandt CDP has an area of 0.97 square miles (2.51 km^{2}), all land.
