= 1936 United States presidential election in Ohio =

- November 3, 1936

| Nominee | Franklin D. Roosevelt | Alf Landon |
| Party | Democratic | Republican |
| Home state | New York | Kansas |
| Running mate | John Nance Garner | Frank Knox |
| Electoral vote | 26 | 0 |
| Popular vote | 1,747,140 | 1,127,855 |
| Percentage | 57.99% | 37.44% |
County results
Roosevelt
40–50%
50–60%
60–70%
70–80%
Landon
40–50%
50–60%
60–70%
President before election
Franklin D. Roosevelt
Democratic
Elected President
Franklin D. Roosevelt
Democratic

The 1936 United States presidential election in Ohio was held on November 3, 1936, as part of the 1936 United States presidential election. State voters chose 26 electors to the Electoral College, who voted for president and vice president.

Ohio was decisively won by Democratic Party candidate, incumbent President Franklin D. Roosevelt, with 57.99% of the popular vote. The Republican Party candidate, Alf Landon, garnered a meager 37.44% of the popular vote. As of the 2024 presidential election, this is the last election in which Allen County and Hancock County voted for a Democratic presidential candidate.

== Results ==
1936 United States presidential election in Ohio
| Party | Candidate | Votes | Percentage | Electoral votes |
|---|---|---|---|---|
| Democratic | Franklin D. Roosevelt (incumbent) | 1,747,140 | 57.99% | 26 |
| Republican | Alf Landon | 1,127,855 | 37.44% | 0 |
| Union | William Lemke | 132,212 | 4.39% | 0 |
| Communist | Earl Browder | 5,251 | 0.17% | 0 |
| Write-ins | Scattered | 131 (Note: This total, including votes for Socialist Norman Thomas and Socialist Labor Party candidate John W. Aiken, differs from that in America at the Polls.) | 0.01% | 0 |
| Totals | | 3,012,589 | 100.0% | 26 |

=== Results by county ===
| County | Franklin D. Roosevelt Democratic | | Alf Landon Republican | | William Lemke Union | | Various candidates Other parties | | Margin | | Total votes cast |
| County | # | % | # | % | # | % | # | % | # | % | Total votes cast |
|---|---|---|---|---|---|---|---|---|---|---|---|
| Adams | 5,832 | 49.55% | 5,910 | 50.21% | 22 | 0.19% | 6 | 0.05% | -78 | -0.66% | 11,770 |
| Allen | 16,500 | 49.12% | 15,079 | 44.89% | 2,002 | 5.96% | 11 | 0.03% | 1,421 | 4.23% | 33,592 |
| Ashland | 8,818 | 57.44% | 6,154 | 40.09% | 357 | 2.33% | 23 | 0.15% | 2,664 | 17.35% | 15,352 |
| Ashtabula | 14,468 | 48.21% | 14,025 | 46.73% | 1,453 | 4.84% | 64 | 0.21% | 443 | 1.48% | 30,010 |
| Athens | 13,205 | 57.61% | 9,509 | 41.48% | 191 | 0.83% | 17 | 0.07% | 3,696 | 16.12% | 22,922 |
| Auglaize | 7,835 | 54.77% | 5,526 | 38.63% | 940 | 6.57% | 4 | 0.03% | 2,309 | 16.14% | 14,305 |
| Belmont | 30,545 | 67.16% | 14,511 | 31.91% | 329 | 0.72% | 96 | 0.21% | 16,034 | 35.25% | 45,481 |
| Brown | 6,316 | 56.96% | 4,511 | 40.68% | 257 | 2.32% | 4 | 0.04% | 1,805 | 16.28% | 11,088 |
| Butler | 29,892 | 59.99% | 17,842 | 35.80% | 1,996 | 4.01% | 102 | 0.20% | 12,050 | 24.18% | 49,832 |
| Carroll | 3,801 | 45.59% | 4,440 | 53.26% | 94 | 1.13% | 2 | 0.02% | -639 | -7.66% | 8,337 |
| Champaign | 6,485 | 47.27% | 6,872 | 50.09% | 357 | 2.60% | 5 | 0.04% | -387 | -2.82% | 13,719 |
| Clark | 26,138 | 61.44% | 15,483 | 36.40% | 884 | 2.08% | 35 | 0.08% | 10,655 | 25.05% | 42,540 |
| Clermont | 9,204 | 53.29% | 7,608 | 44.05% | 444 | 2.57% | 14 | 0.08% | 1,596 | 9.24% | 17,270 |
| Clinton | 5,785 | 47.70% | 6,265 | 51.66% | 71 | 0.59% | 6 | 0.05% | -480 | -3.96% | 12,127 |
| Columbiana | 22,664 | 56.38% | 16,986 | 42.26% | 495 | 1.23% | 53 | 0.13% | 5,678 | 14.13% | 40,198 |
| Coshocton | 9,316 | 58.72% | 6,449 | 40.65% | 93 | 0.59% | 8 | 0.05% | 2,867 | 18.07% | 15,866 |
| Crawford | 10,955 | 59.48% | 6,638 | 36.04% | 810 | 4.40% | 16 | 0.09% | 4,317 | 23.44% | 18,419 |
| Cuyahoga | 311,117 | 65.44% | 128,947 | 27.12% | 33,128 | 6.97% | 2,226 | 0.47% | 182,170 | 38.32% | 475,418 |
| Darke | 11,114 | 54.79% | 8,375 | 41.29% | 788 | 3.89% | 6 | 0.03% | 2,739 | 13.50% | 20,283 |
| Defiance | 5,608 | 48.05% | 5,000 | 42.84% | 1,060 | 9.08% | 2 | 0.02% | 608 | 5.21% | 11,670 |
| Delaware | 7,045 | 47.90% | 7,364 | 50.06% | 297 | 2.02% | 3 | 0.02% | -319 | -2.17% | 14,709 |
| Erie | 10,376 | 55.43% | 6,869 | 36.69% | 1,452 | 7.76% | 23 | 0.12% | 3,507 | 18.73% | 18,720 |
| Fairfield | 12,322 | 59.16% | 8,062 | 38.70% | 430 | 2.06% | 16 | 0.08% | 4,260 | 20.45% | 20,830 |
| Fayette | 5,807 | 54.33% | 4,841 | 45.29% | 33 | 0.31% | 8 | 0.07% | 966 | 9.04% | 10,689 |
| Franklin | 90,746 | 57.42% | 63,830 | 40.39% | 3,325 | 2.10% | 146 | 0.09% | 26,916 | 17.03% | 158,047 |
| Fulton | 3,582 | 35.04% | 6,152 | 60.17% | 482 | 4.71% | 8 | 0.08% | -2,570 | -25.14% | 10,224 |
| Gallia | 4,548 | 40.34% | 6,700 | 59.42% | 17 | 0.15% | 10 | 0.09% | -2,152 | -19.09% | 11,275 |
| Geauga | 3,400 | 46.49% | 3,620 | 49.49% | 282 | 3.86% | 12 | 0.16% | -220 | -3.01% | 7,314 |
| Greene | 8,946 | 53.53% | 7,449 | 44.57% | 299 | 1.79% | 18 | 0.11% | 1,497 | 8.96% | 16,712 |
| Guernsey | 11,404 | 56.82% | 8,532 | 42.51% | 114 | 0.57% | 20 | 0.10% | 2,872 | 14.31% | 20,070 |
| Hamilton | 153,117 | 54.60% | 108,506 | 38.69% | 18,426 | 6.57% | 387 | 0.14% | 44,611 | 15.91% | 280,436 |
| Hancock | 9,929 | 47.77% | 9,816 | 47.23% | 1,030 | 4.96% | 9 | 0.04% | 113 | 0.54% | 20,784 |
| Hardin | 8,441 | 51.84% | 7,631 | 46.86% | 206 | 1.27% | 5 | 0.03% | 810 | 4.97% | 16,283 |
| Harrison | 5,231 | 52.08% | 4,779 | 47.58% | 25 | 0.25% | 10 | 0.10% | 452 | 4.50% | 10,045 |
| Henry | 5,472 | 51.29% | 4,108 | 38.51% | 1,076 | 10.09% | 12 | 0.11% | 1,364 | 12.79% | 10,668 |
| Highland | 8,011 | 51.85% | 7,392 | 47.84% | 39 | 0.25% | 9 | 0.06% | 619 | 4.01% | 15,451 |
| Hocking | 6,580 | 61.62% | 3,960 | 37.09% | 132 | 1.24% | 6 | 0.06% | 2,620 | 24.54% | 10,678 |
| Holmes | 4,097 | 63.70% | 2,247 | 34.93% | 83 | 1.29% | 5 | 0.08% | 1,850 | 28.76% | 6,432 |
| Huron | 8,500 | 47.16% | 8,318 | 46.15% | 1,194 | 6.63% | 10 | 0.06% | 182 | 1.01% | 18,022 |
| Jackson | 6,802 | 49.67% | 6,853 | 50.04% | 33 | 0.24% | 6 | 0.04% | -51 | -0.37% | 13,694 |
| Jefferson | 27,472 | 67.11% | 13,044 | 31.87% | 363 | 0.89% | 56 | 0.14% | 14,428 | 35.25% | 40,935 |
| Knox | 8,315 | 49.97% | 7,956 | 47.81% | 369 | 2.22% | 1 | 0.01% | 359 | 2.16% | 16,641 |
| Lake | 11,213 | 51.66% | 9,386 | 43.24% | 1,070 | 4.93% | 38 | 0.18% | 1,827 | 8.42% | 21,707 |
| Lawrence | 11,471 | 57.17% | 8,498 | 42.35% | 85 | 0.42% | 12 | 0.06% | 2,973 | 14.82% | 20,066 |
| Licking | 17,785 | 58.56% | 11,958 | 39.37% | 606 | 2.00% | 23 | 0.08% | 5,827 | 19.19% | 30,372 |
| Logan | 7,353 | 46.23% | 8,363 | 52.58% | 180 | 1.13% | 9 | 0.06% | -1,010 | -6.35% | 15,905 |
| Lorain | 24,393 | 57.19% | 15,906 | 37.29% | 2,280 | 5.35% | 77 | 0.18% | 8,487 | 19.90% | 42,656 |
| Lucas | 74,155 | 55.76% | 45,853 | 34.48% | 12,616 | 9.49% | 355 | 0.27% | 28,302 | 21.28% | 132,979 |
| Madison | 5,184 | 51.17% | 4,843 | 47.81% | 94 | 0.93% | 9 | 0.09% | 341 | 3.37% | 10,130 |
| Mahoning | 64,886 | 71.41% | 24,825 | 27.32% | 973 | 1.07% | 174 | 0.19% | 40,061 | 44.09% | 90,858 |
| Marion | 11,881 | 55.45% | 9,070 | 42.33% | 459 | 2.14% | 17 | 0.08% | 2,811 | 13.12% | 21,427 |
| Medina | 7,400 | 49.14% | 7,283 | 48.37% | 364 | 2.42% | 11 | 0.07% | 117 | 0.78% | 15,058 |
| Meigs | 6,085 | 48.49% | 6,464 | 51.51% | 0 | 0.00% | 0 | 0.00% | -379 | -3.02% | 12,549 |
| Mercer | 7,217 | 54.66% | 3,602 | 27.28% | 2,381 | 18.03% | 4 | 0.03% | 3,615 | 27.38% | 13,204 |
| Miami | 12,754 | 50.44% | 11,343 | 44.86% | 1,177 | 4.65% | 12 | 0.05% | 1,411 | 5.58% | 25,286 |
| Monroe | 5,368 | 61.64% | 3,211 | 36.87% | 125 | 1.44% | 5 | 0.06% | 2,157 | 24.77% | 8,709 |
| Montgomery | 76,430 | 59.81% | 44,742 | 35.02% | 6,469 | 5.06% | 137 | 0.11% | 31,688 | 24.80% | 127,778 |
| Morgan | 3,093 | 39.65% | 4,630 | 59.35% | 75 | 0.96% | 3 | 0.04% | -1,537 | -19.70% | 7,801 |
| Morrow | 3,947 | 47.83% | 4,086 | 49.52% | 215 | 2.61% | 4 | 0.05% | -139 | -1.68% | 8,252 |
| Muskingum | 16,265 | 49.93% | 15,454 | 47.44% | 822 | 2.52% | 32 | 0.10% | 811 | 2.49% | 32,573 |
| Noble | 3,865 | 46.46% | 4,384 | 52.70% | 70 | 0.84% | 0 | 0.00% | -519 | -6.24% | 8,319 |
| Ottawa | 6,335 | 56.87% | 4,006 | 35.96% | 796 | 7.15% | 2 | 0.02% | 2,329 | 20.91% | 11,139 |
| Paulding | 4,179 | 50.65% | 3,853 | 46.70% | 216 | 2.62% | 3 | 0.04% | 326 | 3.95% | 8,251 |
| Perry | 8,508 | 53.90% | 6,826 | 43.24% | 434 | 2.75% | 17 | 0.11% | 1,682 | 10.66% | 15,785 |
| Pickaway | 7,813 | 61.22% | 4,920 | 38.55% | 24 | 0.19% | 6 | 0.05% | 2,893 | 22.67% | 12,763 |
| Pike | 5,287 | 64.13% | 2,953 | 35.82% | 3 | 0.04% | 1 | 0.01% | 2,334 | 28.31% | 8,244 |
| Portage | 13,798 | 61.43% | 8,035 | 35.77% | 602 | 2.68% | 28 | 0.12% | 5,763 | 25.66% | 22,463 |
| Preble | 6,366 | 51.80% | 5,593 | 45.51% | 325 | 2.64% | 6 | 0.05% | 773 | 6.29% | 12,290 |
| Putnam | 5,786 | 46.23% | 4,151 | 33.16% | 2,566 | 20.50% | 14 | 0.11% | 1,635 | 13.06% | 12,517 |
| Richland | 20,070 | 61.27% | 11,220 | 34.25% | 1,416 | 4.32% | 52 | 0.16% | 8,850 | 27.02% | 32,758 |
| Ross | 12,503 | 55.71% | 9,817 | 43.75% | 95 | 0.42% | 26 | 0.12% | 2,686 | 11.97% | 22,441 |
| Sandusky | 9,171 | 45.26% | 8,692 | 42.89% | 2,382 | 11.75% | 20 | 0.10% | 479 | 2.36% | 20,265 |
| Scioto | 22,243 | 55.08% | 17,860 | 44.23% | 255 | 0.63% | 22 | 0.05% | 4,383 | 10.85% | 40,380 |
| Seneca | 8,982 | 40.35% | 9,953 | 44.71% | 3,307 | 14.86% | 17 | 0.08% | -971 | -4.36% | 22,259 |
| Shelby | 7,110 | 53.43% | 4,482 | 33.68% | 1,706 | 12.82% | 9 | 0.07% | 2,628 | 19.75% | 13,307 |
| Stark | 57,931 | 59.96% | 34,693 | 35.91% | 3,835 | 3.97% | 153 | 0.16% | 23,238 | 24.05% | 96,612 |
| Summit | 91,836 | 68.69% | 38,991 | 29.16% | 2,581 | 1.93% | 288 | 0.22% | 52,845 | 39.53% | 133,696 |
| Trumbull | 32,384 | 64.34% | 16,887 | 33.55% | 966 | 1.92% | 92 | 0.18% | 15,497 | 30.79% | 50,329 |
| Tuscarawas | 21,991 | 66.71% | 10,317 | 31.30% | 622 | 1.89% | 35 | 0.11% | 11,674 | 35.41% | 32,965 |
| Union | 5,157 | 47.10% | 5,673 | 51.81% | 115 | 1.05% | 5 | 0.05% | -516 | -4.71% | 10,950 |
| Van Wert | 7,744 | 52.56% | 6,275 | 42.59% | 704 | 4.78% | 10 | 0.07% | 1,469 | 9.97% | 14,733 |
| Vinton | 2,902 | 48.58% | 3,056 | 51.16% | 14 | 0.23% | 2 | 0.03% | -154 | -2.58% | 5,974 |
| Warren | 7,209 | 49.02% | 7,359 | 50.04% | 134 | 0.91% | 5 | 0.03% | -150 | -1.02% | 14,707 |
| Washington | 10,203 | 47.78% | 10,826 | 50.70% | 311 | 1.46% | 14 | 0.07% | -623 | -2.92% | 21,354 |
| Wayne | 12,666 | 54.08% | 10,331 | 44.11% | 418 | 1.78% | 8 | 0.03% | 2,335 | 9.97% | 23,423 |
| Williams | 5,628 | 42.31% | 7,050 | 53.00% | 619 | 4.65% | 5 | 0.04% | -1,422 | -10.69% | 13,302 |
| Wood | 11,255 | 45.42% | 11,716 | 47.28% | 1,798 | 7.26% | 9 | 0.04% | -461 | -1.86% | 24,778 |
| Wyandot | 5,597 | 54.41% | 4,260 | 41.42% | 429 | 4.17% | 0 | 0.00% | 1,337 | 13.00% | 10,286 |
| Totals | 1,747,140 | 58.00% | 1,127,855 | 37.44% | 132,212 | 4.39% | 5,251 (Note: The Socialist, Socialist Labor and "scattered" vote, totalling 202, was not tabulated by county) | 0.17% | 619,285 | 20.56% | 3,012,458 |

==== Counties that flipped from Republican to Democratic ====
- Athens
- Ashtabula
- Clark
- Columbiana
- Franklin
- Harrison
- Knox
- Lake
- Lawrence
- Lorain
- Medina
- Mahoning
- Miami
- Muskingum
- Perry
- Scioto
- Stark
- Trumbull

==== Counties that flipped from Democratic to Republican ====
- Adams
- Champaign
- Noble
- Seneca
- Union
- Washington
- Williams
- Wood

== See also ==
- United States presidential elections in Ohio
