= Aileen Cole Stewart =

Aileen Cole Stewart (1893–1997) was a prominent, pioneering African American United States Army Nurse Corps nurse during World War I.

One of the first African American United States Army Nurse Corps nurses during World War I, Stewart is best known for her journal article, "Ready to Serve," which details her career as an African American nurse during World War I and in civilian life.

== Early life and education ==
The descendant of enslaved African, Stewart was born in 1893 in Piqua, Ohio. There is very little documentation of Stewart's early life.

In 1914, Stewart enrolled in Howard University College of Medicine’s three-year nursing program at Freedmen's Hospital School of Nursing in Washington, D.C.

As a program prerequisite, Stewart and other nursing candidates were required to endure a three-month probation period. During this period, Stewart cared for patients’ daily needs including cleaning toilets, serving meals, making beds, and taking temperatures. Upon completing her probationary period, Stewart became a freshman nursing student. Howard's program had strict requirements for its nursing students. While working 12-hour shifts, Stewart was prohibited from fraternizing with Howard University medical students, medical student interns, or any other Freedman Hospital employees.

In 1917, Stewart earned her nursing certificate and passed both her Maryland and Washington, DC state board exams.

== Spanish Flu Pandemic, Efforts in West Virginia ==
During World War I, the United States struggled with medical and nursing shortages as a result of the 1918 Spanish flu ravaging the entire globe, killing millions of civilians and military personnel. Nonetheless, the United States government resisted hiring African American nurses as a result of de facto Jim Crow racial segregation laws. However, as soon as the Spanish flu’s second wave hit in October 1918, the federal government had little choice. By the end of October, the Spanish flu killed nearly 200,000 Americans. In October 1918, on behalf of the U.S. Army, the American Red Cross requested Stewart and two other nurses’ assistance in quelling the exponential rise of the Spanish flu among West Virginia’s coal mining communities and its railroad workers. West Virginian coal served as a critical military fuel nexus to transport U.S troops to France for World War I. the mayor of Charleston, West Virginia, R. Logan Walker, acknowledged that the U.S.’s success in World War I was contingent on the American Red Cross protecting the health of its miners.

Stewart traveled by train to Bretz, West Virginia and Putney, West Virginia where she visited twenty homes per day to take mining families’ body temperatures and provide required medications. In November 1918, Stewart helped open a field hospital in Cascade, West Virginia, to address significant Spanish flu infections in the area.

== Service in the U.S. Army Reserve Nurse Corps ==
Two days after opening a field hospital in Cascade Stewart received a letter from the American Red Cross's director of field nursing. The letter asked whether Stewart would be interested in serving in the U.S. Army Reserve Nurse Corps as a nurse. Stewart immediately volunteered. After completing military training, Stewart received a commission as a 1st Lieutenant on November 29, 1918. Along with 17 other African American women, Stewart became the first African American nurse in the U.S. Army Reserve Nurse Corps. Her salary was $50 US. Dollars per month ($903.98 US dollars in 2021).

On December 1, 1918, the U.S. Army sent Stewart and eight other African nurses to Ohio’s Camp Sherman, one of the U.S. Army's largest training and mobilization camps during World War I and one of the U.S. Army's ground zero sites for the Spanish Flu. Residing in racially segregated quarters, Stewart cared for exclusively African American soldiers and German prisoners of war. Stewart remained at Camp Sherman until the U.S. Army discharged her and her fellow nurses on August 16, 1919.

== Post World War I, Personal Life, Death ==
After World War I, Stewart worked at the Booker T. Washington Sanitarium in New York City as a night supervisor. After two years there, Stewart worked as a New York public health nurse for 34 years, retiring in 1956.

In 1928, Stewart married George Stewart. They had one child, a daughter who became a school teacher and freelance writer in Seattle, Washington.

After Stewart retired in 1956, she and her husband relocated to Seattle, Washington where she became a general duty nurse at Seattle's Swedish Hospital. At age 68, Stewart graduated from the University of Washington with a Bachelor of Science degree in public health nursing. She regularly volunteered with the American Red Cross.

Stewart lived in a nursing home in Tacoma, Washington, until her death in 1997.

== Writings ==
In 1963, Stewart wrote a journal article detailing her career as an African American nurse during World War I and in civilian life.

Some direct quotes from “Ready to Serve” consists of “On December 1, I was one of 18 Negro nurses, the first of my race to serve in the Army Nurse Corps... We were assigned to ‘separate but equal’ living quarters on the base, which was the accepted system of segregated living... Even though we lived in this inhibiting climate of segregation, there apparently was no bias or discrimination in our nursing assignments at the base hospital. We were liked, accepted, and respected by officers and men.”

“We treated German prisoners of war as patients just as we did our American boys, and they were grateful.”

This is important to include as it reveals the contradiction of segregation during wartime service. Better yet, it shows how black nurses like Aileen Cole Stewart were finally able to serve people but only within a segregated system. This highlights the persistence of racial inequality even during national crises that demanded unity and sacrifice. In addition, this shows Stewarts professionalism and humanity as even though she was a victim of discrimination but she still be able to care for all of her patients, including German POWs.
