= Ohio State Route 202 =

State highway in western Ohio, US

State Route 202

Route information
- Maintained by ODOT
- Length: 20.06 mi (32.28 km)
- Existed: 1923–present

Major junctions
- South end: SR 201 in Dayton
- SR 4 in Dayton; I-70 in Huber Heights; US 40 near Huber Heights
- North end: SR 55 in Troy

Location
- Country: United States
- State: Ohio
- Counties: Montgomery, Miami

Highway system
- Ohio State Highway System; Interstate; US; State; Scenic
← SR 201	→ SR 203

State Route 202 (SR 202) is a 20-mile (32 km) north–south state highway in the western part of the U.S. state of Ohio. The highway runs from its southern terminus at an intersection with SR 201 in Dayton to its northern terminus at a T-intersection with SR 55 in the eastern end of Troy.

The designation of SR 202 took place in the middle of the 1920s. For much of its length, it parallels Interstate 75 (I-75), which runs about three miles (4.8 km) to the west. Along the way, SR 202 also travels near the eastern edge of the Great Miami River.

== Route description ==
SR 202 traverses northeastern Montgomery County and southeastern Miami County along its way. The highway begins in Dayton at an intersection with Troy Street and Valley Street. In this area, Valley Street carries southbound SR 201 and is located within an interchange complex featuring the SR 4 freeway through Dayton. SR 202 starts out as an urban roadway that heads north, then bends to the northeast, running parallel to the Great Miami River for a couple of miles—entering the suburb of Riverside and changing names from Troy Street to Old Troy Pike as it does so. The route retains its new name even as it again passes inside Dayton city limits. Next, SR 202 passes through the former village of Hooks Corner where it meets Needmore Road, then proceeds into Huber Heights. After curving to the north, SR 202 meets I-70 at the latter's exit 36, a diamond interchange. A short distance later, SR 202 crosses into Miami County, where it loses its alternative name of Old Troy Pike.

Now into Bethel Township, the state highway travels northerly amid a residential area prior to intersecting U.S. Route 40 (US 40) at a signalized intersection in the unincorporated community of Phoneton. SR 202 passes into a more rural setting composed primarily of farmland, with some clumps of trees and houses appearing along the way. It goes through the unincorporated community of West Charleston, then goes on to meet SR 571 at a signalized intersection east of Tipp City. North of SR 571, SR 202 curves to the northwest, clipping the southwest corner of Elizabeth Township prior to crossing into Staunton Township. The route bends to the north immediately before it meets SR 41 at a signalized intersection. SR 202 turns back to the northwest a short distance before it arrives at its endpoint at SR 55 at a T-intersection in the far eastern end of Troy, just north of the Miami Shores Golf Course.

The portion of SR 202 between Chambersburg Road and Taylorsville Road in Huber Heights is designated "U.S. Army Private First Class James P. White, Jr. 'J.P.' Memorial Highway", in honor of a 2005 Wayne High School graduate who died on October 11, 2006, from injuries sustained from hostile fire in Nangalam, Afghanistan.

The portion of SR 202 between SR 4 and I-70 is included within the National Highway System.

== History ==
The SR 202 designation was applied in 1923. Originally, the highway followed the majority of its present routing, from its southern terminus in downtown Dayton to its junction with SR 41, at the time designated as SR 70. It then followed the current SR 41's alignment northwest into downtown Troy, then crossed the Great Miami River concurrently with SR 55. SR 202 then split from SR 55, and was routed along Market Street heading northeast. The state highway then followed what is today known as County Road 193 (CR 193), heading east from Troy into Champaign County. It came to an end at SR 55 southwest of Urbana. In 1925, the entire east–west portion of SR 202 along the current CR 193 was removed from the state highway system. Consequently, the highway was shortened to its present alignment between Dayton and the current SR 41 junction.

The current northernmost portion of SR 202 between SR 41 and SR 55 was brought into the state highway system in 1936, and assigned the designation of SR 504. The 1.29-mile-long (2.08 km) state route would exist until 1982 before SR 504 would be replaced by a northward extension of SR 202.

Originally, SR 202 ran further into downtown Dayton concurrent with SR 4 and SR 201. It began at the intersection of Patterson Boulevard and Third Street (this point also the former terminus of SR 201). Routes 4, 201, and 202 traveled north on Patterson Boulevard, east on First Street, and north along Keowee Street across the Mad River. North of the river, the three state routes traveled along Valley Street with SR 202 splitting from the concurrency at Troy Street where the current routing exists. The truncation occurred c. 2015 at the same time of SR 201's truncation and SR 4's relocation onto US 35 and I-75 out of the downtown area.

== Major intersections ==
County	Location	mi	km	Destinations	Notes
Montgomery	Dayton	0.00– 0.08	0.00– 0.13	SR 201 (Valley Street / Herman Avenue) to SR 4	
Montgomery	Dayton	0.08– 0.14	0.13– 0.23	SR 4 north – Springfield	Interchange; no access to SR 4 southbound
Montgomery	Huber Heights	7.35– 7.47	11.83– 12.02	I-70 – Columbus, Indianapolis	Exit 36 (I-70)
Miami	Bethel Township	9.30	14.97	US 40 (National Road) – Springfield, Vandalia	
Miami	Bethel Township	13.50	21.73	SR 571 – New Carlisle, Tipp City	
Miami	Staunton Township	18.82	30.29	SR 41 – Troy	
Miami	Troy	20.06	32.28	SR 55 (Staunton Road)	
1.000 mi = 1.609 km; 1.000 km = 0.621 mi: Incomplete access
