= Archibald Austin =

American politician (1772–1837)

Archibald Austin (August 11, 1772 – October 16, 1837) was a 19th-century slave owner, politician and lawyer from Virginia who served as a member of the 15th United States Congress.

== Biography ==
Born near Buckingham Courthouse, Austin studied law and was admitted to the bar, commencing practice in Buckingham County, Virginia. His law office was built on the family slave plantation. He was married to Grace R. Booker and they had three children together.

He was a member of the Virginia House of Delegates from 1815 to 1817 and was elected a Democratic-Republican to the United States House of Representatives in 1816, serving from 1817 to 1819 and voting on 88 total bills and resolutions during his time in Congress. He was not a candidate for re-election in 1818.

After serving in Congress, he resumed his law practice and was a presidential elector on the Democratic ticket in 1832 and 1836. Austin returned to the House of Delegates in 1835, serving until his death in 1837.

=== Death and legacy ===
Austin died near Buckingham on October 16, 1837, and was interred in the family cemetery with his wife Grace.

His legal papers were sold in the early part of 20th century to the College of William and Mary, and the collection is housed in the Swem Library. Many court records were burned in 1869 during the courthouse fire, and Austin's files proved invaluable for research in court records of the period.

U.S. House of Representatives
Preceded by John Randolph	Member of the U.S. House of Representatives from Virginia's 16th congressional district March 4, 1817 – March 3, 1819	Succeeded by John Randolph
