= Bloomer, Ohio =

Unincorporated community in Ohio, U.S.

Coordinates: 40°11′16″N 84°24′48″W

Bloomer is an unincorporated community in Miami County, in the U.S. state of Ohio.

== History ==
An old variant name was Bloomertown. A post office called Bloomertown was established in 1878, the name was changed to Bloomer in 1888, and the post office closed in 1926. Besides the post office, Bloomer had a sawmill.
