= Polo, Ohio =

Unincorporated community in Ohio, U.S.

Coordinates: 40°10′56″N 84°21′21″W

Polo is an unincorporated community in Miami County, in the U.S. state of Ohio.

== History ==
A post office called Polo was established in 1882, and remained in operation until 1901. Besides the post office, Polo had a schoolhouse. Polo is located about five miles north of Covington on the St. Marys Pike (Ohio State Route 48) at the place where it crossed the Piqua-Versailles Pike. At one time there was a saw mill, a wood and iron working shop, a grocery exchange, a school and a church located on the County Line northwest of the settlement. About 1915, the Tidewater Station (Tidewater Oil) was built just east of here for the purpose of pumping crude oil in the underground line which ran in a southwest-northeast direction. This station was abandoned during the second World War and is currently being used to house a machine shop. History of Miami County Ohio, Published by The Miami County Historical Society, 1982
