= Grayson, Ohio =

Unincorporated community in Ohio, U.S.

Coordinates: 39°59′42″N 84°08′40″W

Grayson is an unincorporated community in Miami County, in the U.S. state of Ohio.

== History ==
A post office called Grayson was established in 1865, and remained in operation until 1888. Besides the post office, Grayson had a large grain elevator.
