= West Charleston, Ohio =

Unincorporated community in Ohio, U.S.

Coordinates: 39°55′23″N 84°08′01″W

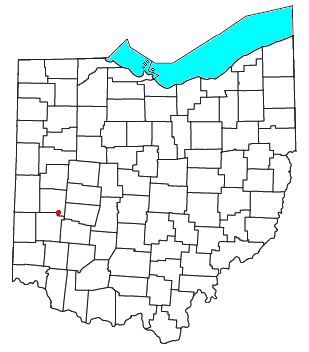
Location of West Charleston, Ohio

West Charleston is an unincorporated community in western Bethel Township, Miami County, Ohio, United States.

West Charleston was originally called Friendtown, and under the latter name was platted in 1807 by Charles Friend, and named for him. The present name is also derived from the name of the proprietor. A post office called West Charleston was established in 1829, and remained in operation until 1899.

West Charleston lies astride State Route 202, earlier known as the North Miami Pike. The road was formed along the route cut through the area by George Rogers Clark in 1782 during his campaigns against the natives at Lower Piqua and Upper Piqua. It is also the route taken southward to Cincinnati by General "Mad Anthony" Wayne after the Battle of Fallen Timbers and the completion of the Treaty of Greenville.

The community is part of the Dayton Metropolitan Statistical Area.
