= Piqua, Ohio =

- City
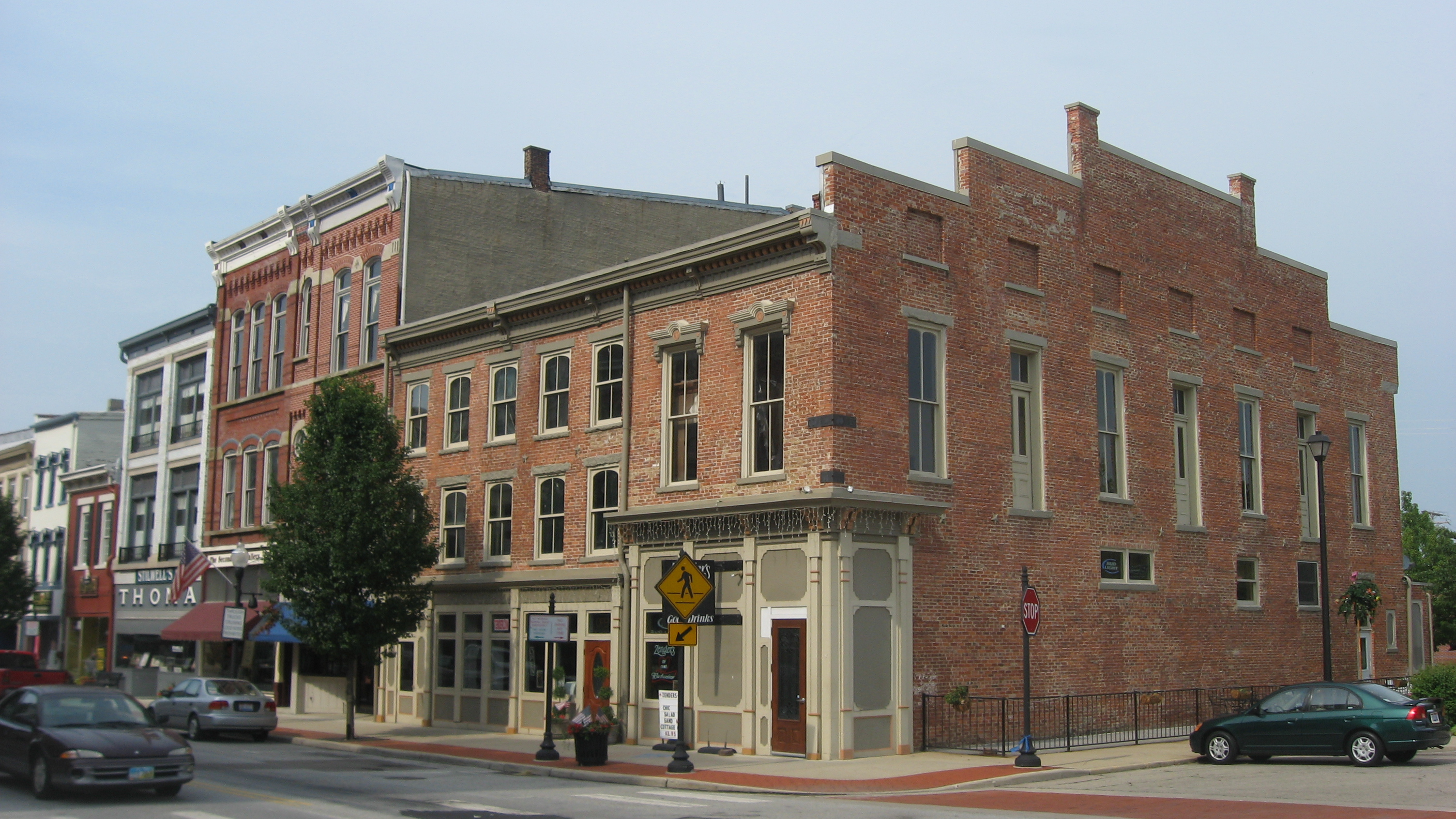
- Downtown Piqua
- Interactive map of Piqua, Ohio
- Location within Ohio Location within the United States
- Coordinates: 40°08′30″N 84°15′10″W
- Country: United States
- State: Ohio
- County: Miami

Government
  - Mayor: Kris Lee (R)

Area
  - Total: 12.04 sq mi (31.18 km^{2})
  - Land: 11.78 sq mi (30.50 km^{2})
  - Water: 0.26 sq mi (0.68 km^{2})
- Elevation: 873 ft (266 m)

Population (2020)
  - Total: 20,354
  - Density: 1,728.7/sq mi (667.45/km^{2})
- Time zone: UTC-5 (Eastern (EST))
  - Summer (DST): UTC-4 (EDT)
- ZIP code: 45356
- Area codes: 937, 326
- FIPS code: 39-62848
- GNIS feature ID: 2396215
- Website: http://www.piquaoh.gov/

Piqua (/ˈpɪkwə/ PIK-wə) is a city in Miami County, Ohio, United States, along the Great Miami River. The population was 20,354 at the 2020 census. Located 27 miles (43 km) north of Dayton, it is part of the Dayton metropolitan area.

== History ==
=== Etymology ===
The word 'Piqua' is believed to be derived from a Shawnee language phrase: Othath-He-Waugh-Pe-Qua, translated as "He has risen from the ashes," related to a legend of the people. It became associated with the Pekowi, one of the five divisions of the Shawnee people, who were eventually known as the Piqua.

=== Early settlements ===
In 1749, Fort Pickawillany was constructed by the British to protect their trading post at a Miami village of the same name. It was located at the confluence of Loramie Creek and the Great Miami River.

In 1752, Charles de Langlade, an Odawa war chief of partial French Canadian descent, attacked the fort. He led more than 240 Odawa and Ojibwe warriors allied with French forces against the British and the Miami village in the Battle of Pickawillany. The Miami chief and a British trader were killed in the conflict.

After the battle, the British and Miami abandoned this site. The Miami rebuilt Pickawillany, and Piqua later developed near their village. The British soon took over the area after defeating the French in the French and Indian War.

Until 1780, Piqua had been the capital town of the Shawnee located on the Mad River about 23 miles southeast of the modern town (near Springfield). That year, an expedition by Gen. George Rogers Clark culminated in the Battle of Piqua, after which the town and surrounding fields were burned. The Shawnee relocated north and west to the Great Miami River. Piqua was settled as two separate Shawnee villages late in 1780, known as Upper Piqua and Lower Piqua.

In 1790, General Harmar found the site on the Great Miami River abandoned and in ruins, as did General Wayne in 1794.

As Gen. Anthony Wayne's Legion was returning to Greenville via Loramie's trading post and Piqua at the termination of their Indian Country campaign in fall 1794, Wayne wrote a letter to Henry Knox dated October 17, 1794, in which he recommended that forts be built at those two locations as waystations along the Miami River. A detachment of Wayne's forces from Greenville built or repaired a small fort and supply depot named Fort Piqua in Upper Piqua on the same site as the (later) farm of Col. John Johnston in winter 1794–95. Capt. J.N. Visher was made commander of the garrison. The fort was garrisoned through 1794 and 1795, and abandoned after the signing of the Treaty of Greenville in 1795.

By 1795, most of Ohio's Shawnee had moved to Missouri and those that remained migrated north to the Auglaize - the southwestern Indian towns were no more. Piqua itself was well below the Greenville Treaty line and would remain abandoned until white settlers arrived.

=== Modern settlement and incorporation ===
The first European settlers arrived in 1798, after the signing of the Treaty of Greenville ending the Northwest Indian War and opening much of Ohio to settlement. In 1807 the village, consisting of seven houses, was surveyed by Armstrong Brandon, a soldier under Gen. Anthony Wayne, and named Washington. It was about a mile southwest of the old Indian villages of Piqua.

By 1816, the Shawnee village of Piqua had been long abandoned; the state legislature, acting on citizen petition, changed the name of Washington village to Piqua. Piqua was incorporated as a town by the Ohio General Assembly in 1823.

During the War of 1812, Piqua was a waystation for men and supplies moving north. In 1819, a land office was established in Piqua which facilitated its growth.

Piqua developed along with construction of the Miami and Erie Canal between 1825 and 1845.

In 1887, Favorite Stove & Range Company moved to Piqua from Cincinnati, and Piqua became known as "Favorite City". When many of the employees settled on the top of South Street Hill, it became known as "Favorite Hill".

=== Rossville ===
Rossville, Ohio was the first free-black enclave in the region. Virginia planter John Randolph of Roanoke, who served as a U.S. representative and senator, arranged for the emancipation of his nearly 400 slaves in his will of 1833. He also provided money for his executor to relocate the freedmen to the free state of Ohio, and to buy land and supplies to help them establish a settlement. The will was challenged but in 1846, his 383 slaves gained their freedom. Most of these freedmen settled in Rumley, Ohio. Some eventually founded Rossville and an associated cemetery, known as the African Jackson Cemetery. These are located on the northeast side of the Great Miami River; they may be accessed by nearby North County Road 25-A. The community has since been incorporated into Piqua.

=== 1913 flood ===
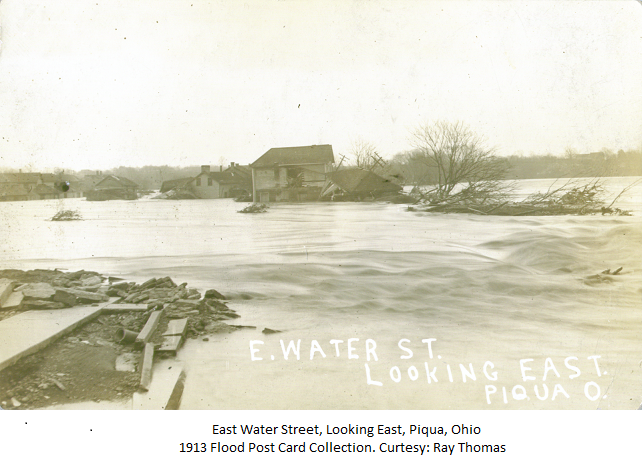
Flooding of the Great Miami River in 1913

Piqua was one of the cities that suffered severe flooding during the Great Dayton Flood of 1913. Piqua is nestled in a sweeping "S" bend of the Great Miami River and experienced regular flooding before the Great Flood of 1913.

On March 22, 1913, a moderate storm moved down the St. Lawrence River basin into the Ohio River basin, with enough rain to moisten the soil upriver from the Miami River and its tributaries. The soil in that upper region is predominantly clayey glacial till, transitioning to mostly Loamy glacial till. Starting on March 23, 1913, rain began to fall for five days. The heaviest rainfall occurred on March 25 with anywhere from 2” in the southeast corner of Ohio to 5” in the area between Piqua and Troy. All together, the total amount of precipitation for this five day period was recorded from 5” in the southeast of Ohio to 11” in the swath between Piqua and Troy.

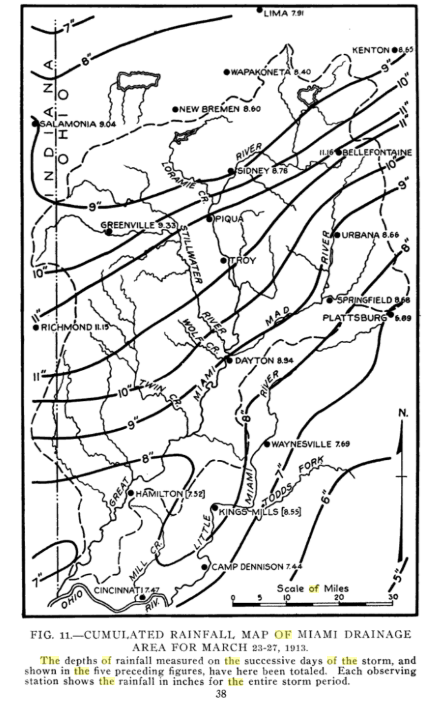
Map: Cumulative Rainfall Miami Drainage Area for March 23–27, 1913. The Miami Valley and the 1913 Flood, Arthur E. Morgan, pg 38.

The flood waters came with such speed and force as to move homes off their foundations, depositing untold amounts of mud in others and claiming forty-nine lives in Piqua and neighboring Rossville alone. In places, streets were damaged or washed out to varying degrees of severity. Public utilities (gas, sewer and water) were hampered to provide services, due to mud clogging up the pipes. The estimated property damage/loss in Piqua reached $1,000,000 ($26.2M in present-day dollars), excluding public utilities and farm losses. The Ohio and Erie Canal, which for 81 years had served as an important connection point from Ohio to the East Coast, was permanently closed to commercial traffic because of extensive flood damage.

=== Atomic City ===
Piqua was home to the first municipally operated nuclear power plant, the Piqua Nuclear Generating Station. The facility was built and operated between 1963 and 1966 as a demonstration project by the United States Atomic Energy Commission. The Atomic Energy Commission bought out the contract with the City of Piqua in order to terminate the operations early, citing higher-priority needs for manpower and funding, lack of programmatic interest, and technical problems.

== Geography ==
According to the United States Census Bureau, the city has a total area of 11.89 square miles (30.79 km^{2}), of which 11.62 square miles (30.10 km^{2}) is land and 0.27 square miles (0.70 km^{2}) is water.

The Great Miami River runs through Piqua. The area at the south end of town on the east side of the river is known as Shawnee.

== Demographics ==
Historical population
Census	Pop.	Note	%±
1810	287		—
1820	350		22.0%
1830	488		39.4%
1840	1,480		203.3%
1850	3,277		121.4%
1860	4,616		40.9%
1870	5,967		29.3%
1880	6,031		1.1%
1890	9,090		50.7%
1900	12,172		33.9%
1910	13,388		10.0%
1920	15,044		12.4%
1930	16,009		6.4%
1940	16,049		0.2%
1950	17,447		8.7%
1960	19,219		10.2%
1970	20,741		7.9%
1980	20,480		−1.3%
1990	20,612		0.6%
2000	20,738		0.6%
2010	20,522		−1.0%
2020	20,354		−0.8%
2025 (est.)	21,064		3.5%

=== 2020 census ===
As of the 2020 census, Piqua had a population of 20,354. The median age was 39.4 years. 23.7% of residents were under the age of 18 and 17.8% of residents were 65 years of age or older. For every 100 females there were 92.8 males, and for every 100 females age 18 and over there were 89.8 males age 18 and over.

99.5% of residents lived in urban areas, while 0.5% lived in rural areas.

There were 8,494 households in Piqua, of which 28.7% had children under the age of 18 living in them. Of all households, 39.5% were married-couple households, 20.0% were households with a male householder and no spouse or partner present, and 30.8% were households with a female householder and no spouse or partner present. About 31.6% of all households were made up of individuals and 13.6% had someone living alone who was 65 years of age or older.

There were 9,205 housing units, of which 7.7% were vacant. The homeowner vacancy rate was 1.8% and the rental vacancy rate was 6.0%.

Racial composition as of the 2020 census
Race	Number	Percent
White	17,899	87.9%
Black or African American	722	3.5%
American Indian and Alaska Native	33	0.2%
Asian	132	0.6%
Native Hawaiian and Other Pacific Islander	4	0.0%
Some other race	204	1.0%
Two or more races	1,360	6.7%
Hispanic or Latino (of any race)	452	2.2%

=== 2010 census ===
As of the 2010 census, there were 20,522 people, 8,318 households, and 5,425 families residing in the city. The population density was 1,766.1 inhabitants per square mile (681.9/km^{2}). There were 9,311 housing units at an average density of 801.3 per square mile (309.4/km^{2}). The racial makeup of the city was 92.4% White, 3.3% African American, 0.2% Native American, 0.7% Asian, 0.4% from other races, and 2.9% from two or more races. Hispanic or Latino of any race were 1.4% of the population.

There were 8,318 households, of which 32.6% had children under the age of 18 living with them, 44.9% were married couples living together, 14.2% had a female householder with no husband present, 6.1% had a male householder with no wife present, and 34.8% were non-families. 28.7% of all households were made up of individuals, and 12.2% had someone living alone who was 65 years of age or older. The average household size was 2.44 and the average family size was 2.96.

The median age in the city was 38.1 years. 24.8% of residents were under the age of 18; 8.7% were between the ages of 18 and 24; 25.6% were from 25 to 44; 26.2% were from 45 to 64; and 14.7% were 65 years of age or older. The gender makeup of the city was 48.0% male and 52.0% female.

=== 2000 census ===
As of the 2000 census, there were 20,738 people, 8,263 households, and 5,585 families residing in the city. The population density was 1,939.2 inhabitants per square mile (748.7/km^{2}). There were 8,886 housing units at an average density of 830.9 per square mile (320.8/km^{2}). The racial makeup of the city was 94.21% White, 3.38% African American, 0.33% Native American, 0.44% Asian, 0.27% from other races, and 1.37% from two or more races. Hispanic or Latino of any race were 0.74% of the population.

There were 8,263 households, out of which 32.7% had children under the age of 18 living with them, 50.4% were married couples living together, 12.9% had a female householder with no husband present, and 32.4% were non-families. 27.3% of all households were made up of individuals, and 11.4% had someone living alone who was 65 years of age or older. The average household size was 2.47 and the average family size was 2.99.

In the city, the population was spread out, with 26.5% under the age of 18, 9.0% from 18 to 24, 28.9% from 25 to 44, 21.3% from 45 to 64, and 14.3% who were 65 years of age or older. The median age was 35 years. For every 100 females, there were 91.4 males. For every 100 females age 18 and over, there were 85.7 males.

The median income for a household in the city was $35,681, and the median income for a family was $41,804. Males had a median income of $31,808 versus $22,241 for females. The per capita income for the city was $18,719. About 9.6% of families and 12.2% of the population were below the poverty line, including 18.0% of those under age 18 and 7.9% of those age 65 or over.

== Economy ==
The city of Piqua is the home of Hartzell Propeller, a producer of small aircraft propellers. Evenflo (formerly Questor Juvenile Furniture) is the leading manufacturer of infant and toddler car seats, and has become one of Piqua's leading employers and industries.

In the late 1890s, Southwest Ohio was the heart of the US flaxseed growing area. There were some 13 linseed oil mills in Piqua, where the flaxseed was "crushed" to extract the vegetable oil, named linseed oil. The flax fiber was used to make both cloth and paper. The oil had a variety of industrial uses. Linoleum is a manufactured flooring product for which linseed oil is the binder. One of the vegetable oil mills in Piqua burned down in the 1890s, a common fate for wooden buildings soaked with vegetable oil. Its owner, American Linseed Oil Company, dispatched Alfred Willard French, their Chief Engineer, from Brooklyn, New York, to organize and supervise the rebuilding of the oil mill.

During the rebuilding of the mill, French included a machine he had invented and patented in 1898, a "cake trimmer", and purchased the most modern equipment then available. He met the leading citizens of Piqua. They were impressed with French, who had graduated from the Massachusetts Institute of Technology in three years, and had entrepreneurial spirit. They decided to invest in a new company he wanted to start. The French Oil Mill Machinery Company was founded May 25, 1900, with French as president, to make "improved oil mill machinery". By 1905 the company was exporting its patented and rugged vegetable oil mill extraction machinery all around the world. Today, the company has customers in over 80 countries, still serving the vegetable oil extraction market (to press such seeds as soybeans, cottonseed, rapeseed, canola, and many others). In addition, the company is a world leader in synthetic rubber dewatering and drying machinery, and in hydraulic molding presses for rubber, thermoplastic and composite materials.

During the late 19th century and much of the 20th century, Piqua was a major center of underwear production. A yearly Outdoor Underwear Festival was held downtown from 1988 until shortly after the demise and demolition of the factory owned by Medalist-Allen A, a direct descendant of the Atlas Underwear Company. Originally the festival had a serious historical focus. In later years it attracted adventurous types from surrounding towns, and Piqua residents discouraged their children from attending. Heritage Green Park now occupies the former Medalist factory site.

The Meteor Motor Car Company had a brief run as an independent record label and phonograph manufacturer in the 1920s. Acquired by Wayne Corporation of Richmond, Indiana, which manufactured school buses, it operated as the Miller-Meteor division. Miller-Meteor produced ambulances and hearses before closing down in 1979.

The Piqua Coca-Cola Bottling Company, owned by the Lange family, was located on the downtown square at the northeast corner of Main and High streets. It produced its signature product along with Sprite, Tab and Fresca in glass bottles for the Upper Miami Valley; metal canned products were shipped in from a plant in Speedway, Indiana. In the mid-1970s, the plant was bought by the Dayton Coca-Cola Bottling Company. The increased demand for Coke products in two-liter plastic bottles and cans made the aging local plant obsolete; it was closed down and razed by the end of the decade. A newer bottling plant was constructed in Huber Heights. A statue of pilot Don Gentile was erected at the site of the defunct plant.

The Val Decker Packing Company, which operated until 1981, was a local producer of hams, hot dogs, and other meats and lard under the tagline "Piquality." The large red steel cans, which contained the lard product, are now sought after as collector's items. The building which housed the meat packing plant was renovated in 1987 for office use by the Piqua Board of Education and several small businesses.

Piqua's industrial past produced a prosperity reflected in residential areas near downtown, which contain numerous large mansions and homes. Most notable is the Leo Flesh Mansion, built in the Chateauesque style. It looms over many of the surrounding buildings in the neighborhood. A "sister" house in Dayton, Ohio, was designed by the same architect.

Piqua's shopping mall, Miami Valley Centre Mall, opened in 1988 and was renovated in the mid-1990s. Miami Valley Crossing (formerly Piqua East Mall, opened in 1970) was redesigned and updated in the late 1990s as a plaza with several anchor stores.

=== Top employers ===
According to Piqua's 2018 Comprehensive Annual Financial Report, the top employers in the city are:

#	Employer	# of Employees
1	Evenflo	606
2	Industry Products Company	411
3	Nitto Denko Automotive Ohio	out of business
4	Walmart	337
5	Piqua City Schools	320
6	Hartzell Propeller	313
7	Piqua Steel Company	304
8	Crane Pumps & Systems Inc	298
9	United Parcel Services	287
10	City of Piqua	190

== Arts and culture ==
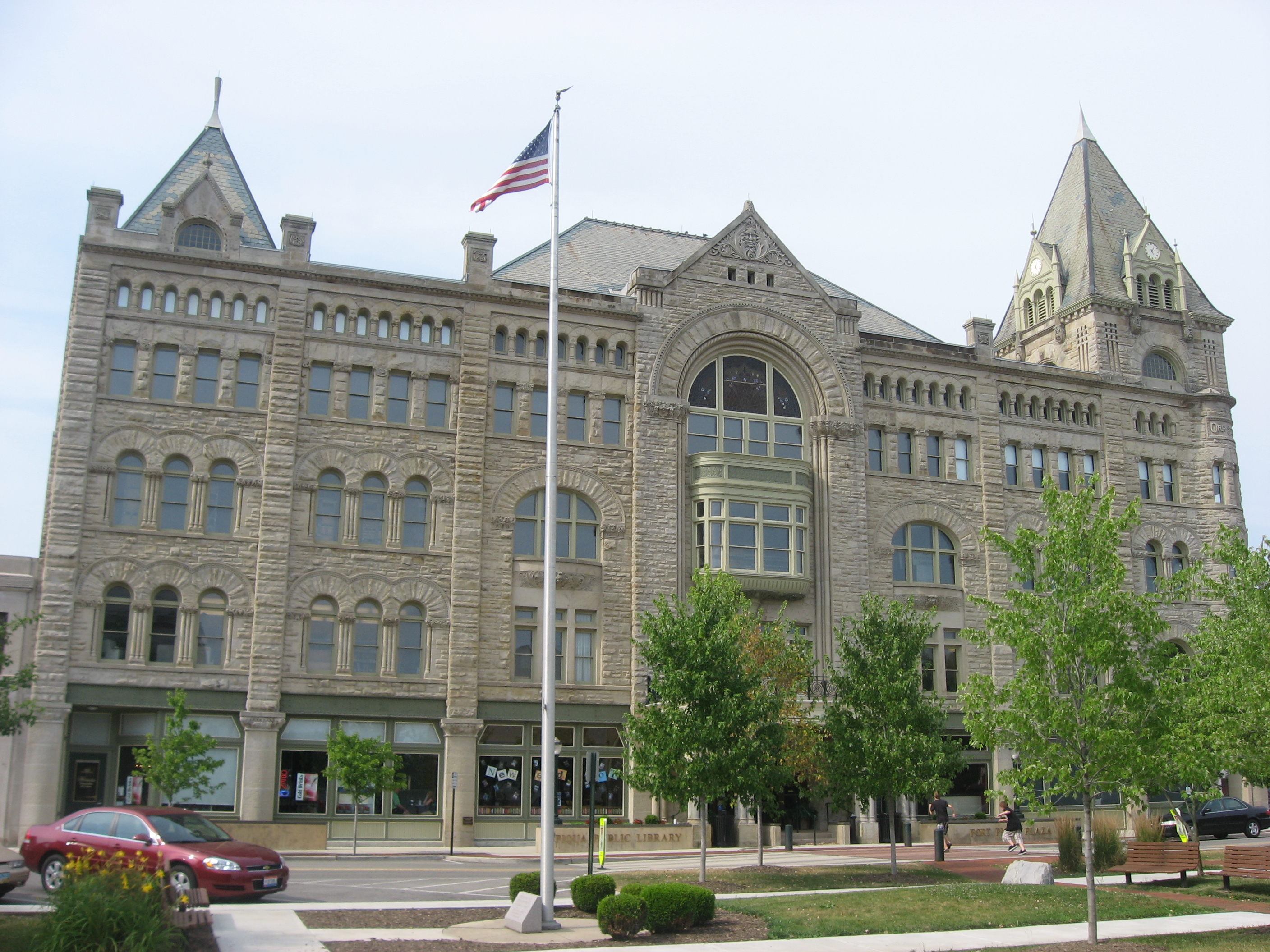
Fort Piqua Hotel is one of four sites in Piqua listed on the National Register of Historic Places

Fort Piqua Plaza began as the "Orr-Statler Block" building at the corner of Main and High Streets was erected in 1891 and long dominated downtown. For many years its core tenant was a hotel of more than 100 rooms, first known as the "Plaza," later as the "Favorite," and finally as the "Fort Piqua." The hotel closed in the 1980s.

The building's street-level commercial spaces were occupied by a variety of businesses over the years, including a barbershop, grocer, bank, the local telephone company business office, Western Union, a combination bus station and taxi office with a very popular soda fountain and lunch counter, and others. Just prior to the start of the Prohibition era, the hotel's bar was moved to the basement level. It is rumored to have closed only its outside entrance during those years, operating as a speakeasy.

The building suffered disrepair and neglect for a period, and renewal plans seemed unable to secure funding. In a public-private redevelopment, the building was fully renovated during a two-year project. Since 2008, its major tenant has been the city's public library. The building is now known as Fort Piqua Plaza.

Beginning in 1886, there were 14 companies in Piqua set up that sold underwear. There were underwear manufacturers in the city until 1993.

The Underwear Festival, in which participants wore underwear publicly and which had entertainment events, was established in 1988. Each instance was for two days. In 1990, the Associated Press stated: "Organizers cautioned that the parade is a family affair." A lack of volunteers led to the disestablishment of the festival in 1998.

== Education ==
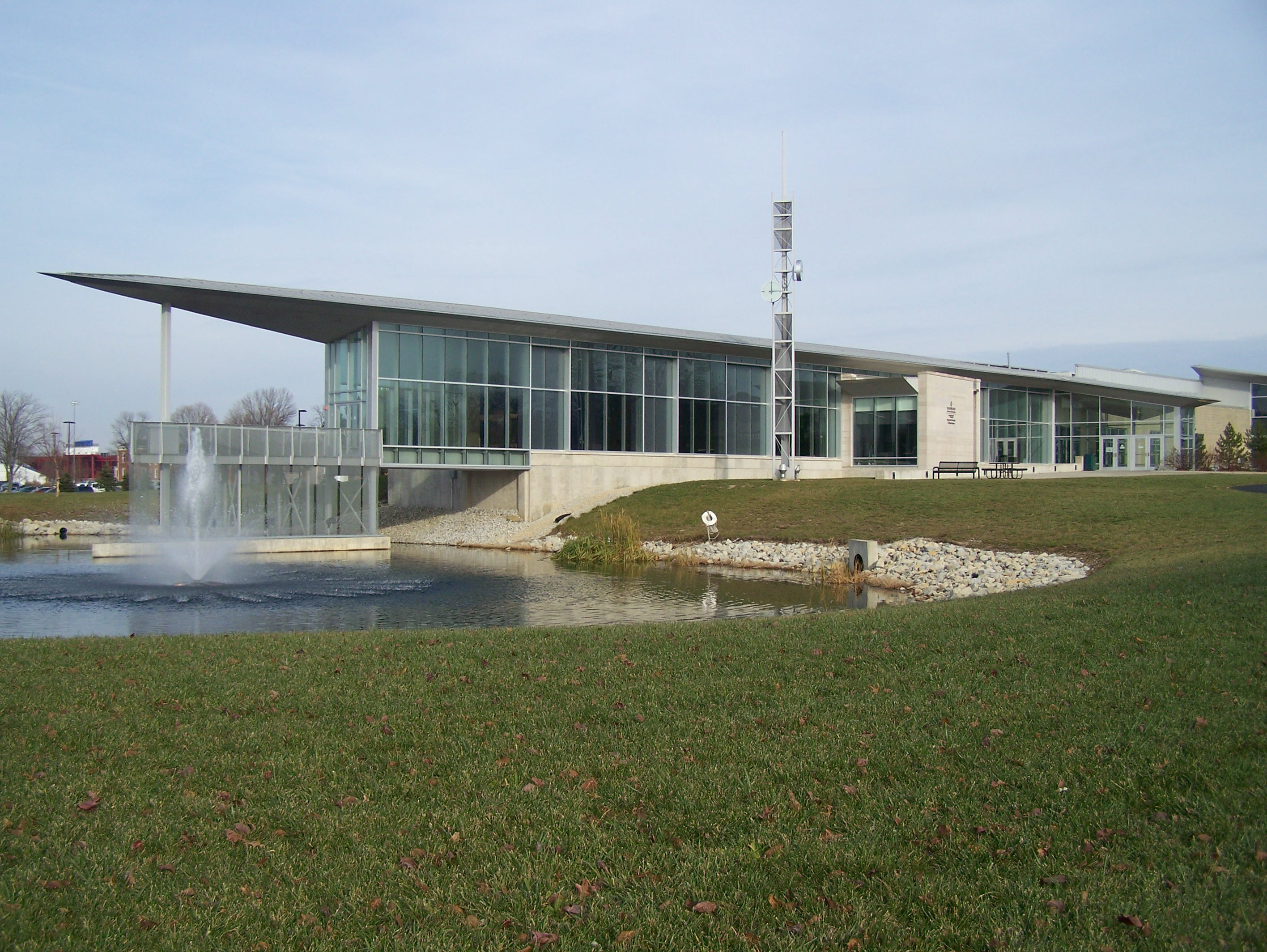
Edison State Community College

The Piqua City School District, which covers the entire city, operates two elementary schools, one intermediate school, one middle school, a junior high school, and Piqua High School. Piqua is also home to the Upper Valley Career Center. Piqua is also home to several private schools, including Piqua Catholic School, the Piqua Seventh Day Adventist School, and the Nicholas School.

Piqua is home to Edison State Community College, established as Ohio's first general and technical college in 1973.

== Media ==
The Piqua Daily Call was published daily from 1884 to 2019 before being consolidated with the Troy Daily News to form Miami Valley Today, which is published Tuesday through Friday in Troy.

Piqua is home to the radio stations WPTW 1570 AM and 98.1 FM, as well as WPLC 95.1 low-power FM as a repeater of Three Angels Broadcasting Network.

== Transportation ==
Piqua has two Main Streets, one being north and southbound along Miami County Road 25-A (the former U.S. Route 25, also known as the Dixie Highway); the other running east through Shawnee. U.S. 36 also runs through much of the city, cutting the town almost directly in half. Main and Ash streets (U.S. 36) converge in Piqua's downtown. Also running through downtown is the east–west Conrail corridor; originally built as the Pennsylvania Railroad two-track throughway, this track was abandoned in 1985 during restructuring of the railroad industry. A section of it was renovated as a bike trail in the summer of 2001, and it is now known as Linear Park. The remaining rail line serving Piqua is the north and southbound Baltimore and Ohio line, now operated by CSX Transportation (CSXT).

== Notable people ==
- Kenneth W. Benner - brigadier general, USMC and veteran of World War II
- Brock Bolen - football player
- Amy Brown - former Wendy’s social media manager
- Craig Clemons - football player
- John W. Daniels - co-founder and former CEO of Archer-Daniels-Midland (ADM)
- Matt Finkes - New York Jets defensive end
- Dominic Salvatore Gentile - World War II ace
- Terri Hemmert - Chicago disc jockey at WXRT-FM
- Charles Blue Jacket - 19th-Century Shawnee chief in Kansas, and Methodist minister
- James Kaiser - electrical engineer who developed the Kaiser window for digital signal processing
- Girard Edward Kalbfleisch - U.S. federal judge
- Kristin King - player on the bronze medal-winning women's U.S. Hockey team at the 2006 Winter Olympics
- Ollie Klee - baseball player
- Bill Lear - inventor and businessman, founder of Lear Jet and inventor of the 8-track cartridge
- William McCulloch - lawyer, member of U.S. House of Representatives, and an author of the Civil Rights Act of 1964
- John F. McKinney - U.S. Representative from Ohio
- Rich McKinney - baseball player
- Mills Brothers - jazz musicians, inducted into the Vocal Group Hall of Fame in 1998
- John G. Mitchell - general in the Union Army
- J. T. Patterson - geneticist
- Quinn Pitcock - football player
- William H. Pitsenbarger - Air Force pararescueman posthumously awarded the Medal of Honor
- Louis Joseph Reicher - first Bishop of Austin, Texas (1948-1971)
- Harry Reser - banjo player and bandleader of the Clicquot Club Eskimos
- Stephen Clegg Rowan - vice admiral, U.S. Navy
- Brandon Saine - football player
- Helen Schelle - founding partner of Fisher-Price, toy manufacturer
- Lawrence Yates Sherman - U.S. Senator and Lieutenant Governor of Illinois
- Tanya Thornton Shewell - member of the Maryland House of Delegates
- Hiram Y. Smith - lawyer and U.S. Representative from Iowa
- Mike Smith - baseball player
- Jack Snow - fantasy and horror author
- Muffin Spencer-Devlin - professional golfer
- Joseph J. Spengler - economist, statistician, and historian of economic thought
- Aileen Cole Stewart (1893-1997), African American United States Army Nurse Corps nurse during World War I.
- Lester J. Whitlock, U.S. Army major general
- Joseph Widney - doctor, educator, historian, and religious leader
- Robert M. Widney - founding father of the University of Southern California
- James P. Wisecup - vice admiral, U.S. Navy
- Patrick Zircher - artist, Marvel and DC comics

== In popular culture ==
- Dav Pilkey's Captain Underpants and Dog Man children's book series is set in Piqua. It was chosen because of its defunct annual "Underwear Festival".
