= Upper Valley Career Center =

Coordinates: 40°09′40.1″N 84°12′50.6″W

Upper Valley Career Center (formerly Upper Valley Joint Vocational School), is a public vocational school in Piqua, Ohio. The school educates adult and high school students train in to get experience needed to get a professional job.

== Location ==
Upper Valley Career Center is located at 8811 Career Dr., Piqua, Ohio 45356 right next door to Edison Community College. In addition to the main campus, there are several Adult Division facilities:

- Applied Technology Center - Piqua, Ohio
- Stouder Center - Troy, Ohio
- Garbry Conference and Learning Center - Piqua, Ohio

== Academics ==
Upper Valley Career Center is a vocational school designed to train students in a variety of skills. Having a location in Ohio they are surrounded by companies in the manufacturing industry. UVCC serves approximately 900 students in 29 career-technical programs offered on the main campus. In addition, UVCC offers many satellite programs in 14 associate schools. These satellite programs serve many thousands of students in grades nine through twelve. In addition to the 29 career programs offered by the school, UVCC also offers the necessary academic curriculum that is required for graduation with a diploma. The school also features a restaurant, the Cornerstone@8811, that is owned and operated by the students of the UVCC Chef Training Class.

== History ==
The Upper Valley Joint Vocational School (JVS) opened up in 1975 with a goal to teach students skills for careers in life. In 1976 the school was given property of land that is now called the Willowbrook Land Laboratory. Through 35 years of education, UVCC has made news countless times on the projects and community service performed by the students of the school. Some of the news articles that have UVCC articles are Dayton Daily News, Troy Daily News, and Piqua Daily Call. As UVCC took in more students over the years, it grew into more programs and fields of studies thus making the school become a hotspot for potential employers. In the early years of the school it did not have many programs and a major program was the HVAC which is taking off today. In addition to the many programs today, UVCC has managed to pull in companies that hire students who either attend there or even graduate from there.
