= African Jackson Cemetery =

Historic African American cemetery in Ohio, U.S.

- U.S. National Register of Historic Places
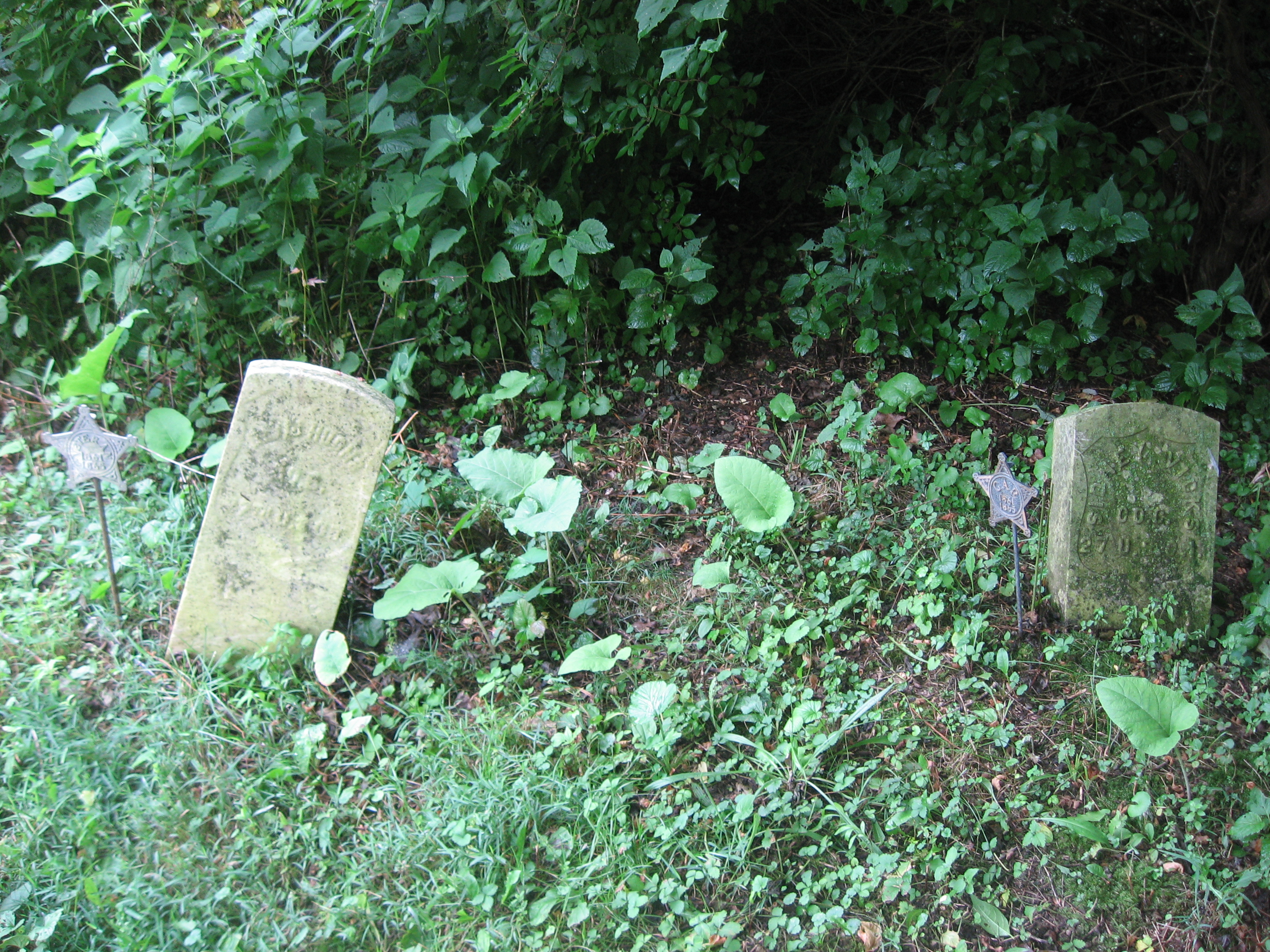
- Gravestones in the cemetery

- Location within Ohio Location within the United States
- Location: North of Piqua on Zimmerlin Rd.
- Coordinates: 40°9′25″N 84°14′7″W
- Area: 1 acre (0.40 ha)
- NRHP reference No.: 82001475
- Added to NRHP: December 16, 1982

The African Jackson Cemetery is a historic cemetery in the western part of the U.S. state of Ohio. Formed by a colony of more than 300 freedmen from Virginia, who were freed in the will of John Randolph of Roanoke, it has been the resting place for many. Active into the 20th century, it is one of the last extant physical remnants of Rossville, a black settlement founded near the city of Piqua in the late 1840s. The cemetery is listed on the National Register of Historic Places because of its connection to the history of free people of color in pre-Civil War Ohio.

== History ==
Beginning in the 1820s, Virginia planter John Randolph of Roanoke, a US Congressman, wrote a succession of wills in which he planned for the manumission of his more than 600 slaves, together with providing money to relocate the freedmen to the free state of Ohio and buy land for them. He contradicted himself in various documents and failed to provide clear direction regarding which will was to be followed. Following his death in 1833, lawsuits were quickly filed to challenge probate of his estate, and twelve years passed before the litigation was finished and his 600 slaves' futures were resolved. As ultimately resolved by the courts, his will provided for his slaves' emancipation and transportation to a free state, and western Ohio was chosen as their destination.

Money from Randolph's estate was used to buy 2,000 acres (810 ha) in Mercer County, but the area was home to the freedmen for only a short while. They left due to hostility and discrimination by the whites living in the region. Some 383 freedmen migrated southward to Miami and Shelby counties. They developed the Randolph Slave Settlement, located just north of Piqua at Rossville, as one of many rural black settlements in pre-Civil War Ohio. Churches had been established in Rossville as early as 1815, but the new settlers ultimately founded their own church in 1864, a Baptist congregation. Within the following decade, they established their own cemetery (1866) and school (1872). In contrast to the white Baptist cemetery, which was abandoned and thoroughly derelict by 1880, their African Jackson Cemetery was active well into the twentieth century.

By the early 1980s, comparatively little remained of the black settlement at Rossville; it had been absorbed by Piqua. The nearby York Rial House has been documented as the home of a prominent member of this black community. The cemetery is the chief surviving physical remainder of the community. For this reason, it was listed on the National Register of Historic Places in 1982, and the York Rial House was added in 1986.
