= Piqua High School =

Location
- 1 Indian Trail; Piqua, Ohio 45356; United States
- Coordinates: 40.16402°N 84.20668°W

Information
- Type: Public
- School district: Piqua City School District
- Principal: Rob Messick
- Teaching staff: 48.00 (on an FTE basis)
- Grades: 9–12
- Enrollment: 916 (2023–24)
- Student to teacher ratio: 19.08
- Colors: Red and blue
- Athletics conference: Miami Valley League
- Team name: Indians
- Rival: Troy High School, Sidney High School
- Website: piqua.org/piquahighschool_home.aspx

Piqua High School is a public high school in Piqua, Ohio, United States, and is the only high school in the Piqua City Schools district. The current high school was completed in 1981 and sits adjacent to Alexander Stadium, completed in 2001. The school's athletic teams are known as the Indians, and the school colors are red and blue. Piqua's longstanding high school rivals are the Troy Trojans and the Sidney Yellow Jackets, both schools from neighboring communities. The school includes 9th to 12th grade, with approximately 930 students enrolled. Piqua is a member of the Miami Valley League (MVL).

The school district, of which Piqua High is the sole comprehensive high school, includes Piqua, as well as most of Springcreek Township and Washington Township.

The school was reported to have an explosion and fire on July 1, 2024.

== OHSAA State championships ==
- Football – 2006

== Notable alumni ==
- Kenneth W. Benner, Brigadier general in the Marine Corps and World War II veteran
- Bryant Haines, college football coach
- Kristin King, ice hockey bronze medal winner in 2004
- Quinn Pitcock, professional football player in the National Football League (NFL)
- Brandon Saine, professional football player in the NFL
- Joseph J. Spengler, economist, statistician, and historian of economic thought

== See also ==
- Old Piqua High School
