= Piqua City Schools =

School district in Ohio, United States

Address
- 215 Looney Road Piqua, Ohio, 45356; United States

District information
- Type: Public
- Grades: KG–12
- Schools: 5
- NCES District ID: 3904464

Students and staff
- Students: 3,069 (2024–2025)
- Teachers: 191.54 (on an FTE basis) (2024–2025)
- Staff: 351.89 (on an FTE basis) (2024–2025)
- Student–teacher ratio: 16.02 (2024–2025)

Other information
- Website: www.piqua.org

Piqua City Schools is a school district headquartered in Piqua, Ohio. The district includes Piqua, as well as most of Springcreek Township and Washington Township.

== History ==
James Wisecup served as superintendent until 1975. That year, the board voted to remove him, with three voting in favor and two voting to retain him. Joel Walker, the editor of the Troy Daily News, wrote that "The Wisecup-board feud has apparently been brewing for quite some time."

In 2016 an alumnus of the school district, Dwayne Thompson, became the superintendent.

== Schools ==
- Piqua High School
- Piqua Junior High School
- Piqua Central Intermediate School
- Springcreek Primary School
- Washington Primary School
