= Rumley, Ohio =

Unincorporated community in Ohio, US

Coordinates: 40°24′49″N 84°14′36″W

Rumley is an unincorporated community in Shelby County, in the U.S. state of Ohio.

== History ==
Rumley was founded by Joel and Wesley Goings, two free Black men from Virginia who descended from John Graweere. The first dwelling in Rumley was built in 1837. A post office called Rumley was established in 1839, and remained in operation until 1842.

== See also ==
- Carthagena, Ohio
- Pee Pee Township, Ohio
- Rossville, Ohio
