= Rossville, Ohio =

Unincorporated community in Ohio, U.S.

Coordinates: 40°09′25″N 84°14′21″W

Rossville is an unincorporated community in Miami County, in the U.S. state of Ohio.

== History ==
Rossville was platted between 1835 and 1840, and named for one Mr. Ross, the original owner of the town site. The Randolph Freedpeople set up a community in Rossville, leaving behind the African Jackson Cemetery.

== See also ==
- Carthagena, Ohio
- Pee Pee Township, Ohio
- Rumley, Ohio
