= Miami County, Ohio =

County in Ohio, United States

- County
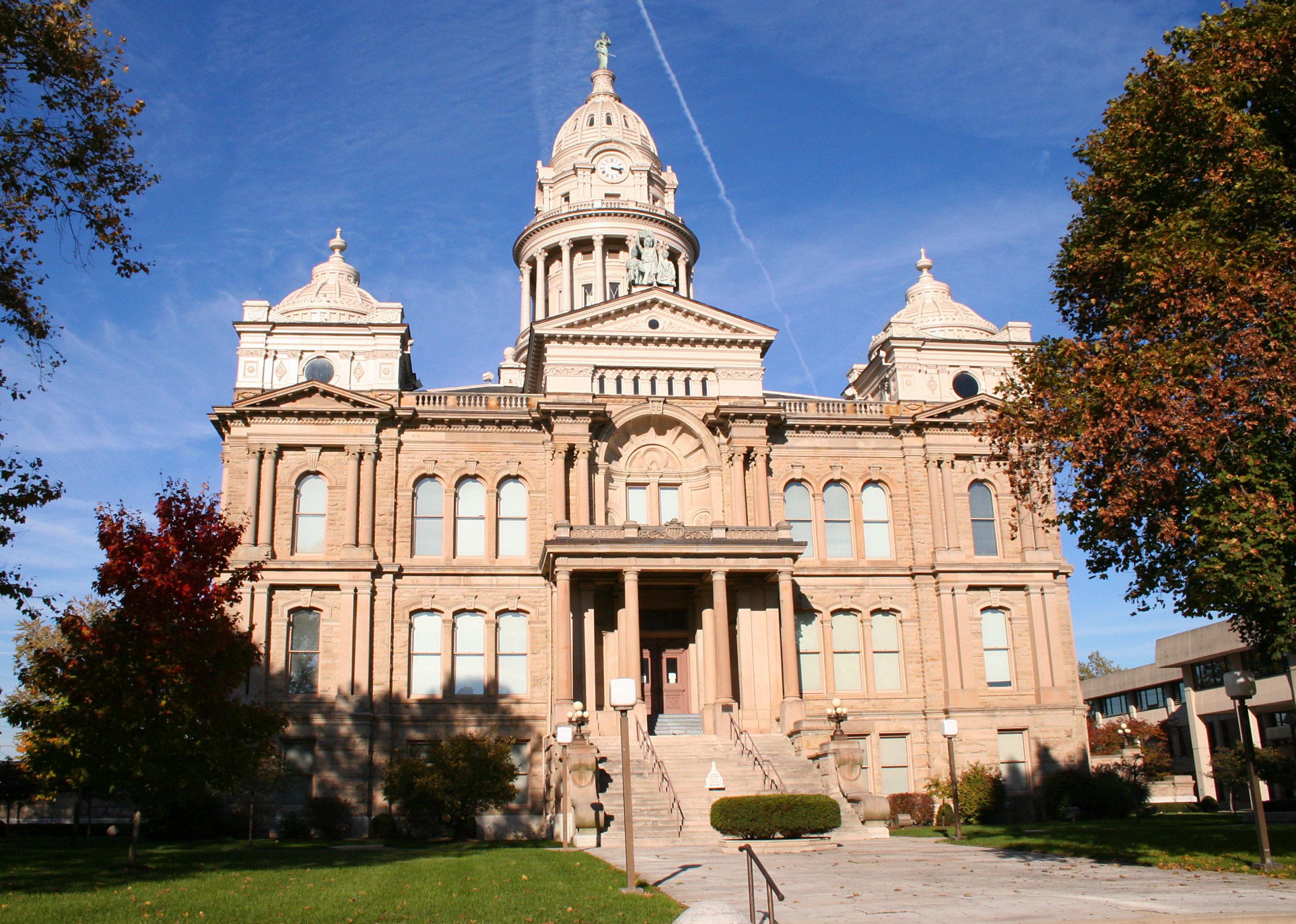
- County courthouse in Troy

- Flag Seal

- Location within the U.S. state of Ohio
- Coordinates: 40°03′N 84°14′W
- Country: United States
- State: Ohio
- Founded: March 1, 1807
- Named for: Miami people
- Seat: Troy
- Largest city: Troy*

Area
  - Total: 410 sq mi (1,100 km^{2})
  - Land: 407 sq mi (1,050 km^{2})
  - Water: 3.1 sq mi (8.0 km^{2}) 0.8%

Population (2020)
  - Total: 108,774
  - Estimate (2025): 112,634 ▲
  - Density: 267/sq mi (103/km^{2})
- Time zone: UTC−5 (Eastern)
  - Summer (DST): UTC−4 (EDT)
- Congressional districts: 8th, 15th
- Website: www.miamicountyohio.gov

Miami County is a county located in the U.S. state of Ohio. As of the 2020 census, the population was 108,774. Its county seat is Troy. The county is named in honor of the Miami people. Miami County is part of the Dayton metropolitan area.

== Geography ==
According to the U.S. Census Bureau, the county has a total area of 410 square miles (1,100 km^{2}), of which 407 square miles (1,050 km^{2}) is land and 3.1 square miles (8.0 km^{2}) (0.8%) is water.

=== Adjacent counties ===
- Shelby County (north)
- Champaign County (northeast)
- Clark County (southeast)
- Montgomery County (south)
- Darke County (west)

== Demographics ==
Historical population
Census	Pop.	Note	%±
1810	3,941		—
1820	8,851		124.6%
1830	12,807		44.7%
1840	19,688		53.7%
1850	24,999		27.0%
1860	29,959		19.8%
1870	32,740		9.3%
1880	36,158		10.4%
1890	39,754		9.9%
1900	43,105		8.4%
1910	45,047		4.5%
1920	48,428		7.5%
1930	51,301		5.9%
1940	52,632		2.6%
1950	61,309		16.5%
1960	72,901		18.9%
1970	84,342		15.7%
1980	90,381		7.2%
1990	93,182		3.1%
2000	98,868		6.1%
2010	102,506		3.7%
2020	108,774		6.1%
2025 (est.)	112,634	▲	3.5%
U.S. Decennial Census; 1790-1960 1900-1990; 1990-2000 2020

=== 2020 census ===
Miami County, Ohio – Racial and ethnic composition Note: the US Census treats Hispanic/Latino as an ethnic category. This table excludes Latinos from the racial categories and assigns them to a separate category. Hispanics/Latinos may be of any race.
Race / Ethnicity (NH = Non-Hispanic)	Pop 1980	Pop 1990	Pop 2000	Pop 2010	Pop 2020	% 1980	% 1990	% 2000	% 2010	% 2020
White alone (NH)	87,865	90,261	94,262	95,908	96,964	97.22%	96.87%	95.34%	93.56%	89.14%
Black or African American alone (NH)	1,765	1,769	1,923	2,063	2,559	1.95%	1.90%	1.95%	2.01%	2.35%
Native American or Alaska Native alone (NH)	81	149	181	173	152	0.09%	0.16%	0.18%	0.17%	0.14%
Asian alone (NH)	217	597	770	1,213	1,644	0.24%	0.64%	0.78%	1.18%	1.51%
Native Hawaiian or Pacific Islander alone (NH)	x	x	6	13	21	x	x	0.01%	0.01%	0.02%
Other race alone (NH)	67	40	95	110	483	0.07%	0.04%	0.10%	0.11%	0.44%
Mixed race or Multiracial (NH)	x	x	910	1,685	4,752	x	x	0.92%	1.64%	4.37%
Hispanic or Latino (any race)	386	366	721	1,341	2,199	0.43%	0.39%	0.73%	1.31%	2.02%
Total	90,381	93,182	98,868	102,506	108,774	100.00%	100.00%	100.00%	100.00%	100.00%

As of the 2020 census, the county had a population of 108,774. The median age was 41.3 years. 23.3% of residents were under the age of 18 and 19.3% of residents were 65 years of age or older. For every 100 females there were 96.9 males, and for every 100 females age 18 and over there were 94.3 males age 18 and over.

The racial makeup of the county was 89.7% White, 2.4% Black or African American, 0.2% American Indian and Alaska Native, 1.5% Asian, <0.1% Native Hawaiian and Pacific Islander, 1.0% from some other race, and 5.2% from two or more races. Hispanic or Latino residents of any race comprised 2.0% of the population.

69.4% of residents lived in urban areas, while 30.6% lived in rural areas.

There were 44,086 households in the county, of which 29.6% had children under the age of 18 living in them. Of all households, 51.2% were married-couple households, 17.3% were households with a male householder and no spouse or partner present, and 24.4% were households with a female householder and no spouse or partner present. About 27.5% of all households were made up of individuals and 12.5% had someone living alone who was 65 years of age or older.

There were 46,766 housing units, of which 5.7% were vacant. Among occupied housing units, 70.5% were owner-occupied and 29.5% were renter-occupied. The homeowner vacancy rate was 1.1% and the rental vacancy rate was 5.7%.

=== 2010 census ===
As of the 2010 United States census, there were 102,506 people, 40,917 households, and 28,626 families living in the county. The population density was 252.1 inhabitants per square mile (97.3/km^{2}). There were 44,256 housing units at an average density of 108.8 units per square mile (42.0 units/km^{2}). The racial makeup of the county was 94.4% white, 2.0% black or African American, 1.2% Asian, 0.2% American Indian, 0.5% from other races, and 1.8% from two or more races. Those of Hispanic or Latino origin made up 1.3% of the population. In terms of ancestry, 34.5% were German, 13.5% were Irish, 10.2% were English, and 9.8% were American.

Of the 40,917 households, 32.3% had children under the age of 18 living with them, 54.7% were married couples living together, 10.5% had a female householder with no husband present, 30.0% were non-families, and 25.3% of all households were made up of individuals. The average household size was 2.48 and the average family size was 2.95. The median age was 40.6 years.

The median income for a household in the county was $51,507 and the median income for a family was $61,190. Males had a median income of $46,133 versus $32,699 for females. The per capita income for the county was $25,006. About 7.0% of families and 9.5% of the population were below the poverty line, including 14.0% of those under age 18 and 4.8% of those age 65 or over.

=== 2000 census ===
As of the census of 2000, there were 98,868 people, 38,437 households, and 27,943 families living in the county. The population density was 243 people per square mile (94 people/km^{2}). There were 40,554 housing units at an average density of 100 units per square mile (39/km^{2}). The racial makeup of the county was 95.78% White, 1.95% Black or African American, 0.19% Native American, 0.79% Asian, 0.01% Pacific Islander, 0.28% from other races, and 1.00% from two or more races. 0.73% of the population were Hispanic or Latino of any race.

There were 38,437 households, out of which 33.30% had children under the age of 18 living with them, 59.50% were married couples living together, 9.70% had a female householder with no husband present, and 27.30% were non-families. 23.20% of all households were made up of individuals, and 9.50% had someone living alone who was 65 years of age or older. The average household size was 2.54 and the average family size was 2.99.

In the county, the population was spread out, with 25.90% under the age of 18, 7.60% from 18 to 24, 28.40% from 25 to 44, 24.80% from 45 to 64, and 13.20% who were 65 years of age or older. The median age was 38 years. For every 100 females there were 96.20 males. For every 100 females age 18 and over, there were 92.40 males.

The median income for a household in the county was $44,109, and the median income for a family was $51,169. Males had a median income of $37,357 versus $25,493 for females. The per capita income for the county was $21,669. About 5.10% of families and 6.70% of the population were below the poverty line, including 9.10% of those under age 18 and 5.60% of those age 65 or over.

== Politics ==
Miami County is a Republican stronghold county in presidential elections, with Democrats winning the county only three times in 1912, 1936, and 1964.

United States presidential election results for Miami County, Ohio
Year	Republican		Democratic		Third party(ies)	
Year	No.	%	No.	%	No.	%
1856	3,171	59.63%	1,988	37.38%	159	2.99%
1860	3,431	58.69%	2,337	39.98%	78	1.33%
1864	3,821	61.94%	2,348	38.06%	0	0.00%
1868	3,958	59.82%	2,659	40.18%	0	0.00%
1872	3,753	56.03%	2,910	43.45%	35	0.52%
1876	4,388	55.40%	3,509	44.31%	23	0.29%
1880	4,928	57.33%	3,604	41.93%	64	0.74%
1884	5,273	55.56%	4,084	43.03%	134	1.41%
1888	5,312	53.04%	4,258	42.51%	446	4.45%
1892	5,110	51.26%	4,271	42.84%	588	5.90%
1896	6,051	52.60%	5,387	46.83%	65	0.57%
1900	6,197	53.86%	5,127	44.56%	181	1.57%
1904	6,793	62.44%	3,646	33.51%	440	4.04%
1908	6,558	53.69%	5,369	43.95%	288	2.36%
1912	3,615	32.49%	4,310	38.74%	3,200	28.76%
1916	5,772	48.61%	5,582	47.01%	519	4.37%
1920	13,122	60.28%	8,076	37.10%	572	2.63%
1924	11,851	62.70%	5,296	28.02%	1,754	9.28%
1928	16,063	72.80%	5,867	26.59%	136	0.62%
1932	12,157	51.95%	10,677	45.62%	568	2.43%
1936	11,343	44.86%	12,754	50.44%	1,189	4.70%
1940	14,725	55.52%	11,799	44.48%	0	0.00%
1944	14,751	58.47%	10,476	41.53%	0	0.00%
1948	13,100	56.33%	10,066	43.29%	89	0.38%
1952	19,525	65.11%	10,462	34.89%	0	0.00%
1956	20,135	68.57%	9,229	31.43%	0	0.00%
1960	22,151	65.30%	11,770	34.70%	0	0.00%
1964	12,985	40.12%	19,379	59.88%	0	0.00%
1968	16,997	50.62%	13,228	39.40%	3,352	9.98%
1972	21,226	68.44%	9,121	29.41%	665	2.14%
1976	18,686	57.65%	13,074	40.34%	653	2.01%
1980	19,928	55.65%	12,893	36.01%	2,987	8.34%
1984	26,300	72.42%	9,695	26.70%	320	0.88%
1988	24,915	68.38%	11,138	30.57%	381	1.05%
1992	19,741	45.90%	12,547	29.17%	10,718	24.92%
1996	19,509	48.77%	15,540	38.85%	4,956	12.39%
2000	26,037	60.78%	15,584	36.38%	1,220	2.85%
2004	33,992	65.67%	17,606	34.01%	162	0.31%
2008	33,417	63.15%	18,372	34.72%	1,126	2.13%
2012	34,606	66.53%	16,383	31.50%	1,025	1.97%
2016	37,079	69.84%	13,120	24.71%	2,895	5.45%
2020	41,371	71.23%	15,663	26.97%	1,043	1.80%
2024	42,678	71.80%	15,969	26.87%	791	1.33%

United States Senate election results for Miami County, Ohio1
Year	Republican		Democratic		Third party(ies)	
Year	No.	%	No.	%	No.	%
2024	39,225	66.72%	17,525	29.81%	2,039	3.47%

== Government ==
=== Current officials ===
- Board of Commissioners:
  - Ted Mercer (R)
  - Wade Westfall (R)
  - Greg Simmons (R)
- County Auditor: Matthew W. Gearhardt (R)
- Clerk of Courts: Shawn Peeples (R)
- County Coroner: William N. Ginn, M.D. (R)
- County Engineer: Paul Huelskamp (R)
- County Prosecutor: Paul Watkins (R)
- County Recorder: David Norman *appointed (R)
- Sheriff: Dave Duchak (R)
- County Treasurer: James Stubbs (R)

Miami County Court of Common Pleas

- Judges:
  - Stacy Wall (R)
  - Jeannine Pratt (R)
  - Scott Altenburger(R)

Municipal Court

- Judges:
  - Samuel Huffman(R)
  - Anthony E. Kendell (R)
- Magistrates:
  - James Utrecht

== Education ==
=== Public school districts ===
- Bethel Local Schools
  - Bethel High School, Bethel Township (the Bees)
- Bradford Schools
  - Bradford High School, Bradford (the Railroaders)
- Covington Exempted Village School District
  - Covington High School, Covington (the Buccs/Buccaneers)
- Miami East Local Schools
  - Miami East High School, Casstown (the Vikings)
- Milton-Union Exempted Village Schools
  - Milton-Union High School, West Milton (the Bulldogs)
- Newton Local School District
  - Newton High School, Newton (the Indians)
- Piqua City Schools
  - Piqua High School, Piqua (the Indians)
- Tipp City Exempted Village School District
  - Tippecanoe High School, Tipp City (the Red Devils)
- Troy City Schools
  - Troy High School, Troy (the Trojans)

=== Miscellaneous education ===
The Western Ohio Japanese Language School (オハイオ西部日本語学校 Ohaio Seibu Nihongo Gakkō) is a supplementary weekend Japanese school in unincorporated Miami County, near Troy. It started in April 1988.

== Communities ==
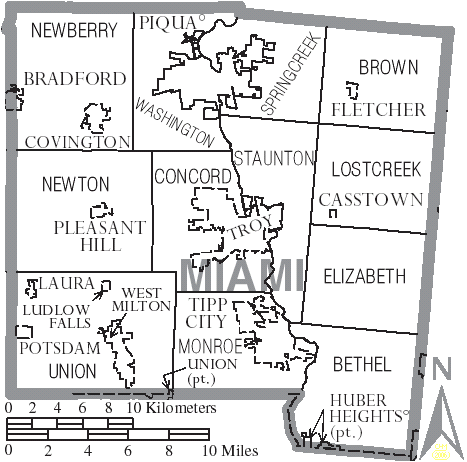
Municipalities and townships of Miami County

=== Cities ===
- Huber Heights (part)
- Piqua
- Tipp City
- Troy (county seat)
- Union (part)

=== Villages ===
- Bradford (part)
- Casstown
- Covington
- Fletcher
- Laura
- Ludlow Falls
- Pleasant Hill
- Potsdam
- West Milton

=== Townships ===
- Bethel
- Brown
- Concord
- Elizabeth
- Lostcreek
- Monroe
- Newberry
- Newton
- Springcreek
- Staunton
- Union
- Washington

=== Census-designated place ===
- Brandt

=== Unincorporated communities ===
- Alcony
- Bloomer
- Brandt
- Conover
- Frederick
- Garland
- Ginghamsburg
- Grayson
- Kessler
- Lena
- Phoneton
- Polo
- Rossville
- West Charleston

== See also ==
- National Register of Historic Places listings in Miami County, Ohio
