= Ohio State Route 49 =

State highway in western Ohio, US

State Route 49
- Route of SR 49 highlighted in red

Route information
- Maintained by ODOT
- Length: 153.06 mi (246.33 km)
- Existed: 1926–present

Major junctions
- South end: US 35 in Trotwood
- I-70 in Clayton; US 40 in Clayton; US 127 in Greenville; US 33 near Willshire; US 224 near Wren; US 30 near Convoy; US 24 in Antwerp; US 6 in Edgerton; I-80 / I-90 / Ohio Turnpike near Columbia; US 20 near Columbia
- North end: M-49 near Cooney

Location
- Country: United States
- State: Ohio
- Counties: Montgomery, Miami, Darke, Mercer, Van Wert, Paulding, Defiance, Williams

Highway system
- Ohio State Highway System; Interstate; US; State; Scenic
← SR 48	→ US 50

State Route 49 (SR 49) is a state highway in the western part of the U.S. state of Ohio. It begins in Drexel, an area within the city of Trotwood, at US 35 and runs northwesterly to Greenville, and then runs roughly along near the western edge of the state near the Indiana state line to the Michigan state line where it meets with Michigan's M-49.

== Route description ==
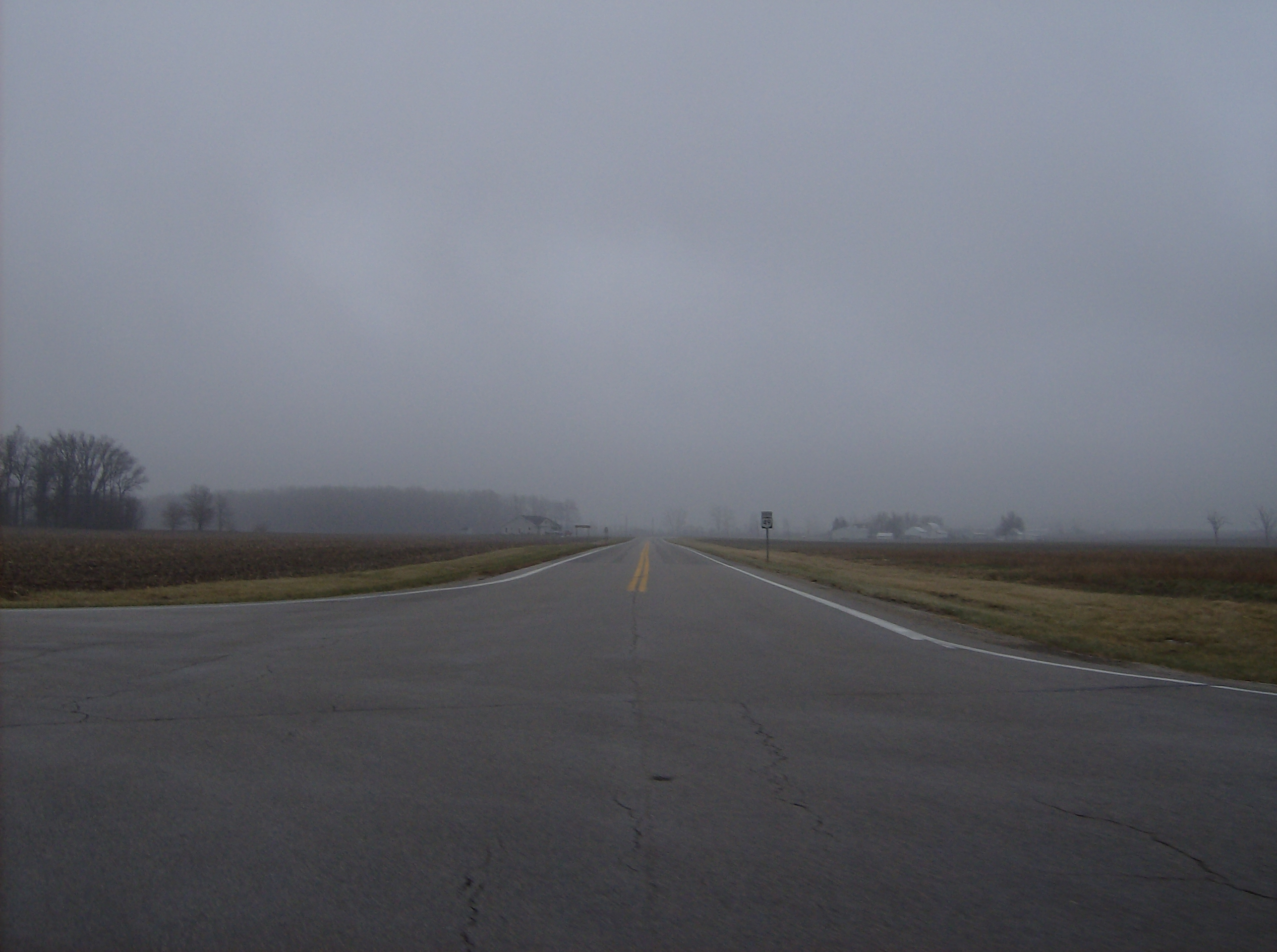
Along SR 49 at its intersection with SR 705 in northwestern Darke County

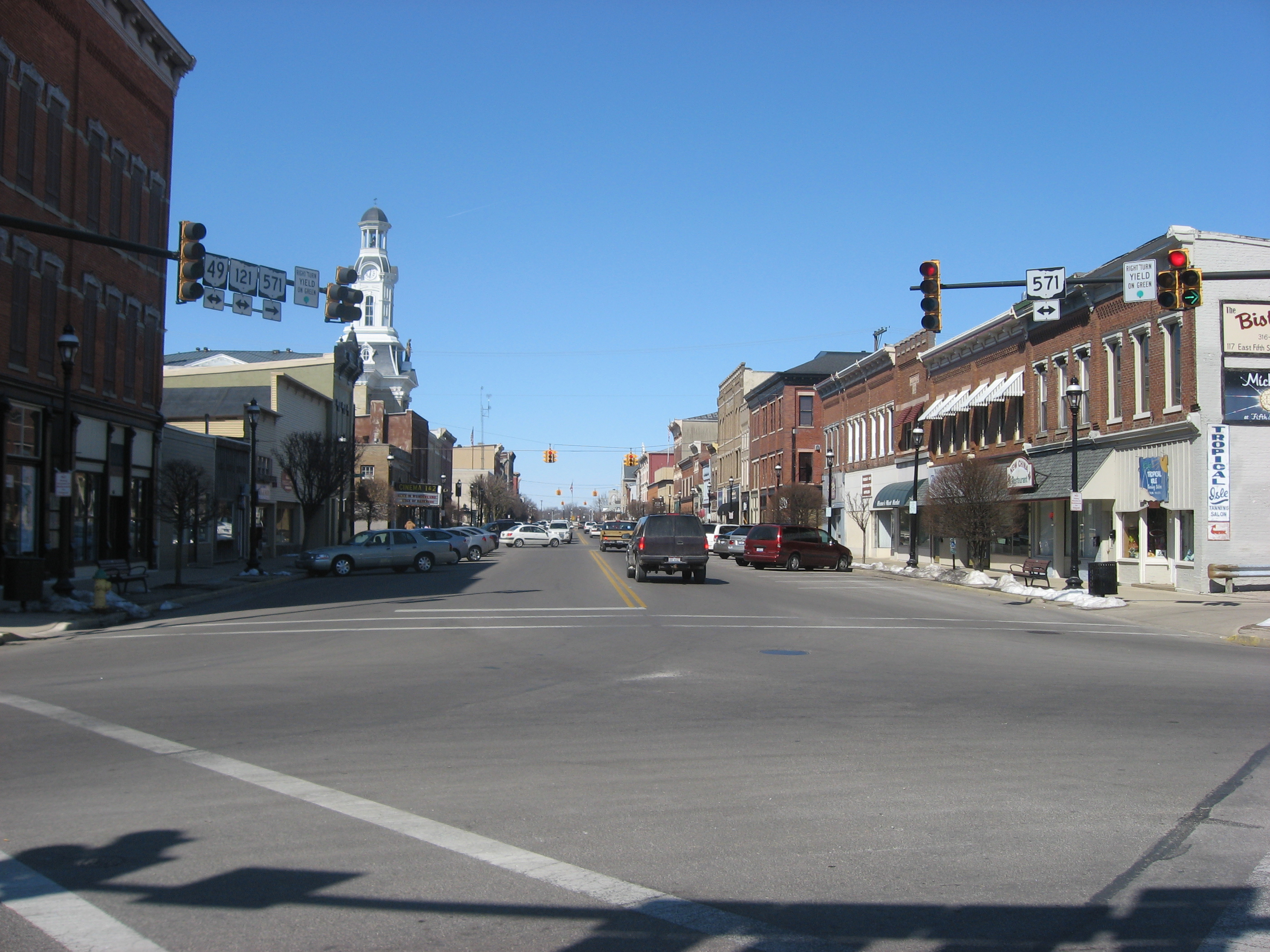
The intersection of Washington Street, Martin Street, and Broadway (SR 49, SR 121, and SR 571) in Greenville

SR 49's southern terminus is west of Dayton, at the intersection of U.S. Route 35 and West Third Street in Drexel. Both Drexel (a census-designated place) and the intersection straddle the border between Trotwood and Montgomery County's Jefferson Township. The roadway carrying SR 49 continues southward (signed "east") from this intersection as US 35 (designated "C. J. McLin Jr. Parkway"), a limited-access expressway into downtown Dayton. (Westbound US 35 proceeds along West Third Street)

SR 49 continues north from US 35 through Trotwood along an expressway with traffic signals locally called the "Northwest Connector" or the "Trotwood Connector", then turns onto Salem Avenue, which crosses into Clayton. The route then briefly travels through Englewood, straddles the Englewood-Clayton line, again crosses into Clayton, then the ramps to and from Interstate 70 cross into Englewood and back into Clayton. SR 49 is then concurrent with I-70 for approximately 1.5 miles (2.4 km) through Clayton. SR 49 then exits from I-70 at ramps passing from Clayton into Clay Township, Montgomery County. The route then continues north to Greenville, Fort Recovery, Willshire, Convoy, Payne, Antwerp, Hicksville, Edgerton and Edon. SR 49 then interchanges with the Ohio Turnpike at that highway's first interchange east of the Indiana-Ohio state line. SR 49 terminates at the Ohio-Michigan state line where it continues north as Michigan State Highway 49.

A portion of SR 49 in Montgomery County has been designated the "Joseph G. LaPointe Jr. Memorial Highway", in honor of the United States Army medic who posthumously received the Medal of Honor for his actions during the Vietnam War.

== History ==
SR 49 was first designated along its current route between US 30 in Van Wert County and the Michigan state line in 1927 having replaced a discontinuous section of SR 51. In 1932, the route was slightly extended south to Convoy two miles (3.2 km) south of US 30 before absorbing SR 51 south to Greenville the next year. All of SR 51 was then renumbered to SR 49 in 1935 extending the route from downtown Dayton to Michigan. No major changes would occur to the routing until around 1960 when a part of SR 49 was rerouted on a new expressway segment of US 40 south and west of Clayton (now partly I-70) and the route through southern Darke County was straightened to bypass Arcanum. The old routing through Arcanum became SR 49 Alternate.

The most recent change to SR 49 occurred in the 1990s. Before 1999, SR 49 began in downtown Dayton at SR 4 and SR 48. It traveled west along First Street and Monument Avenue, crossing under I-75, and over the Great Miami River. The eastbound and westbound directions merged at the intersection of Salem and Riverview avenues before it traveled northwest out of the city on Salem Avenue. A new four-lane expressway through Trotwood with traffic signals was partially completed in 1994 between Free Pike and Salem Avenue with the new expressway being designated SR 49 Future. By 1999, the new expressway between US 35 and Salem Avenue was complete and SR 49 was rerouted out of Dayton to run on this new highway. The old route to Dayton was designated SR 49-J indicating that it was being prepared for abandonment. The old segment of SR 49 along Salem Avenue was finally deleted from the state highway system in the summer of 2004.

== Major intersections ==
County	Location	mi	km	Exit	Destinations	Notes
Montgomery	Trotwood	0.00	0.00		US 35 (West 3rd Street) – Eaton, Dayton	
Montgomery	Clayton–Englewood; City line	8.87– 9.37	14.27– 15.08	26	I-70 east – Dayton	Southern end of I-70 concurrency; access from northbound SR 49 to westbound I-70 / from SR 49 southbound to eastbound I-70 only
Montgomery	Clay Township–Clayton municipal line	10.73	17.27	24	I-70 west – Indianapolis	Northern end of I-70 concurrency; access from northbound SR 49 to westbound I-70 / from SR 49 southbound to eastbound I-70 only
Montgomery	Clay Township	12.00	19.31		US 40 (National Road) – Englewood, Lewisburg	
Miami	Union Township	16.02	25.78		SR 721 north – Potsdam, Laura	Southern terminus of SR 721
Darke	Monroe Township	17.38	27.97		SR 722 west / CR 21 (Castine Gordon Road) – Gordon, Ithaca	Eastern terminus of SR 722
Darke	Twin Township	22.99	37.00		SR 49 Alt. north / CR 82 (Pitsburg Laura Road) – Arcanum, Pitsburg	Southern terminus of SR 49 Alt.
Darke	Van Buren Township	25.63	41.25		SR 49 Alt. south / CR 34 (Arcanum Bears Mill Road)	Northern terminus of SR 49 Alt.
Darke	Greenville Township	30.72– 30.92	49.44– 49.76		US 36 / US 127	Interchange
Darke	Greenville	33.07	53.22		SR 121 south (Jefferson Street) / Sweitzer Street	Southern end of SR 121 concurrency
Darke	Greenville	33.79	54.38		SR 571 east (Martin Street) to US 36	Southern end of SR 571 concurrency
Darke	Greenville	34.06	54.81		SR 118 begins / SR 121 north / SR 502 west (Main Street)	Northern end of SR 121 concurrency; southern end of SR 118 concurrency; eastern terminus of SR 502; traffic circle
Darke	Greenville	34.35	55.28		SR 118 north (Broadway)	Northern end of SR 118 concurrency
Darke	Greenville	34.74	55.91		SR 571 west	Northern end of SR 571 concurrency
Darke	Brown Township	43.04	69.27		SR 47 – Union City, Ansonia	
Darke	Mississinawa Township	51.57	82.99		SR 705 east / CR 19 (New Weston Fort Laramie Road) – New Weston	Western terminus of SR 705
Mercer	Fort Recovery	57.15	91.97		SR 119 (East Butler Street)	
Mercer	Washington Township	62.02	99.81		SR 219	
Mercer	Washington Township	66.57	107.13		SR 29 – Celina, Bryant, Ind.	
Mercer	Black Creek Township	74.12	119.28		SR 707	
Van Wert	Willshire	80.48	129.52		US 33 east	Southern end of US 33 concurrency
Van Wert	Willshire	80.68	129.84		US 33 west / SR 81 west (Walcott Street) / State Street	Northern end of US 33 concurrency; southern end of SR 81 concurrency
Van Wert	Willshire Township	80.77	129.99		SR 81 east	Northern end of SR 81 concurrency
Van Wert	Harrison Township	87.97	141.57		US 224 west – Decatur, Ind.	Southern end of US 224 concurrency
Van Wert	Harrison Township	91.60	147.42		US 224 east / CR 55 (Convoy Heller Road) – Van Wert	Northern end of US 224 concurrency
Van Wert	Tully Township	97.75	157.31		US 30 east / CR 55 (Convoy Heller Road) – Van Wert	Southern end of US 30 concurrency
Van Wert	Tully Township	99.09	159.47		US 30 west / Payne Road – Fort Wayne, Ind.	Northern end of US 30 concurrency
Paulding	Benton Township	103.60	166.73		SR 114 – Haviland	
Paulding	Benton Township	107.35	172.76		SR 500 west	Southern end of SR 500 concurrency
Paulding	Payne	107.65	173.25		SR 613 west (Townline Street)	Southern end of SR 613 concurrency
Paulding	Payne	107.77	173.44		SR 500 east / SR 613 east (Merrin Street)	Northern end of SR 500 / SR 613 concurrency
Paulding	Harrison Township	111.69	179.75		SR 111 – Paulding	
Paulding	Carryall Township	113.97– 114.10	183.42– 183.63		US 24 – Defiance, Fort Wayne, Ind.	Exit 3 (US 24)
Defiance	Hicksville	122.66	197.40		SR 2 west (West High Street) / Specerville Street	Southern end of SR 2 concurrency
Defiance	Hicksville	122.97	197.90		SR 18 west (Main Street)	Southern end of SR 18 concurrency
Defiance	Hicksville	123.39	198.58		SR 18 east (Defiance Avenue)	Northern end of SR 18 concurrency
Defiance	Hicksville	124.04	199.62		SR 2 east	Northern end of SR 2 concurrency
Defiance	Milford Township	129.51	208.43		SR 249 – Bryan	
Williams	Edgerton	134.03	215.70		US 6 west (West Vine Street)	Southern end of US 6 concurrency
Williams	Edgerton	134.09	215.80		US 6 east (Indiana Street)	Northern end of US 6 concurrency
Williams	Edon	142.29	228.99		SR 34 (Indiana Street)	
Williams	Florence Township	144.29	232.21		SR 107 east / CR L – Montpelier, West Unity	Western terminus of SR 107
Williams	Northwest Township	147.33– 147.47	237.10– 237.33		I-80 / I-90 / Ohio Turnpike – Toledo, Indiana Toll Road, Chicago	Interchange; toll road
Williams	Northwest Township	147.77	237.81		US 20 west / T-70 – Angola, Ind.	Southern end of US 20 concurrency
Williams	Northwest Township	148.78	239.44		US 20 east / CR 71 – Fayette	Northern end of US 20 concurrency
Williams	Northwest Township	153.06	246.33		M-49 north – Camden	Michigan state line
1.000 mi = 1.609 km; 1.000 km = 0.621 mi: Concurrency terminus; Tolled

== SR 49 Alternate ==
State Route 49 Alternate
- Location: Arcanum
- Length: 4.09 mi (6.58 km)
- Existed: 1962–present

Map of SR 49 Alt.

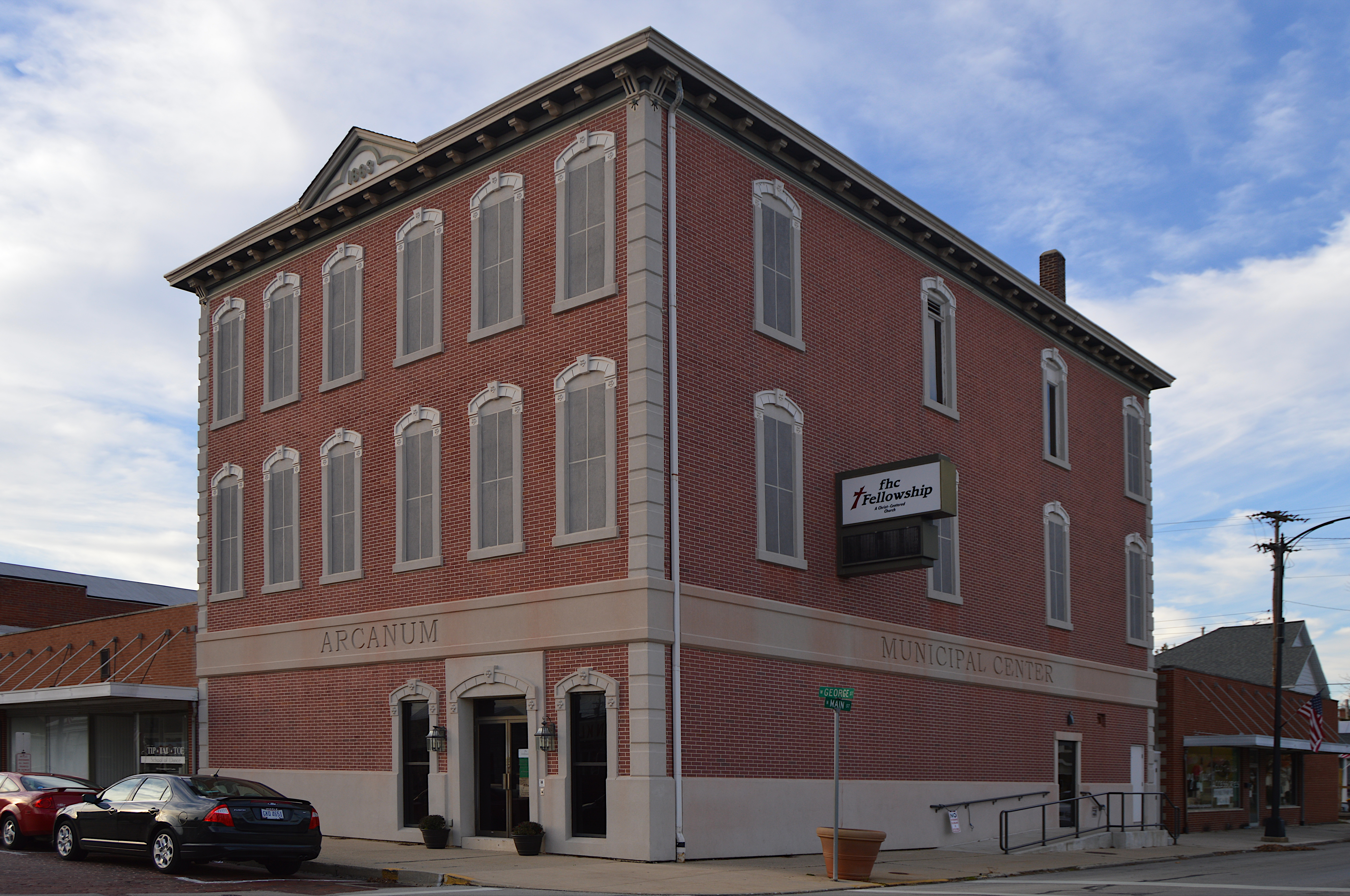
FHC Fellowship Church in Arcanum, Ohio

State Route 49 Alternate (SR 49 Alt., officially designated SR 49A) is a 4.09-mile-long (6.58 km) alternate route to SR 49 in southern Darke County. The route travels in an L-shape, and serves the community of Arcanum. SR 49 Alt. has its southern terminus at SR 49 approximately 1.75 miles (2.82 km) east of the village. It travels west into Arcanum, then turns north and proceeds to its northern terminus where it meets SR 49 again 1 mile (1.6 km) north of the village limits.

SR 49 Alt. was established in 1962. Prior to this year, mainline SR 49 followed the entirety of SR 49 Alt. through Arcanum. In 1962, SR 49 was re-routed onto the more linear alignment that it utilizes today to the northeast of Arcanum between the endpoints of SR 49 Alt. Consequently, the SR 49 Alt. designation was applied to this former mainline alignment of SR 49.

Major intersections
The entire route is in Darke County.

Location	mi	km	Destinations	Notes
Twin Township	0.00	0.00	SR 49 / CR 82 east (Pitsburg Laura Road) – Dayton, Pitsburg	
Van Buren Township	4.09	6.58	SR 49 / CR 34 north (Arcanum Bears Mill Road) – Greenville	
1.000 mi = 1.609 km; 1.000 km = 0.621 mi
