= Ohio State Route 48 =

North-south state highway in Ohio, US

State Route 48
- U.S.A.F. Pararescue Memorial Parkway
- SR 48 highlighted in red

Route information
- Maintained by ODOT
- Length: 83.03 mi (133.62 km)
- Existed: 1926–present

Major junctions
- South end: SR 132 near Goshen
- US 22 / SR 3 in Hopkinsville; I-71 in South Lebanon; US 42 in Lebanon; I-675 in Centerville; US 35 in Dayton; I-75 / SR 4 in Dayton; I-70 near Englewood; US 40 in Englewood; US 36 / SR 41 in Covington
- North end: SR 66 near Houston

Location
- Country: United States
- State: Ohio
- Counties: Clermont, Warren, Montgomery, Miami, Shelby

Highway system
- Ohio State Highway System; Interstate; US; State; Scenic
← SR 47	→ SR 49
← US 50	SR 50	→ US 50N

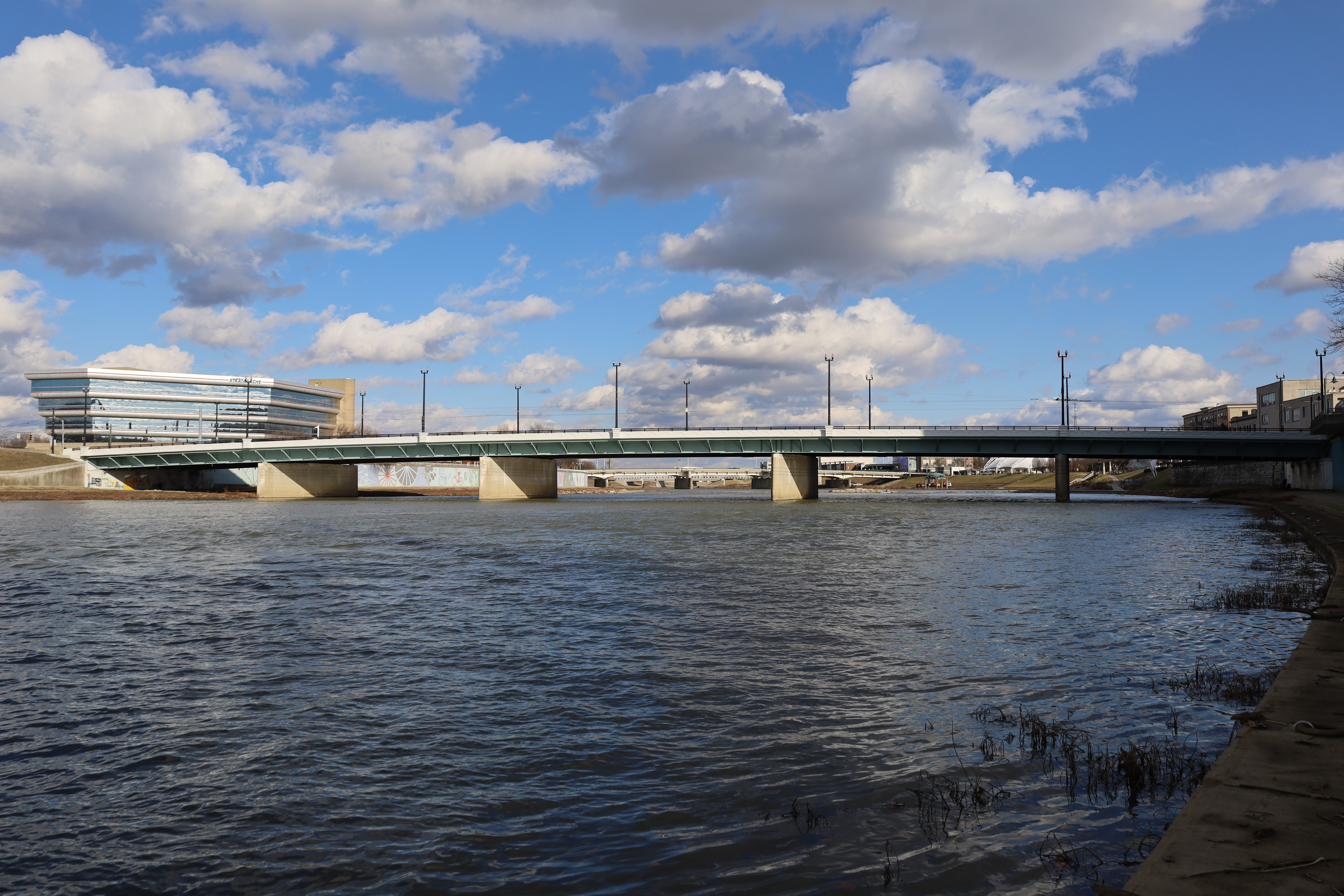
SR 48 crosses the Great Miami River over the Main Street Bridge in Dayton

State Route 48 (SR 48) is a north–south highway in Ohio that runs from SR 132 near Goshen to SR 66 near Houston, passing through Dayton.

== Route description ==
=== Commemorative designations ===
On February 15, 2005, Governor Bob Taft signed Senate Bill 156, which designated SR 48 as the U.S.A.F. Pararescue Memorial Parkway. The route runs near the hometowns of four pararescuemen who were killed in action: William H. Pitsenbarger of Piqua, Sgt. Jim Locker of Sidney, Master Sgt. William McDaniel II of Greenville, and Airman 1st Class James Pleiman of Russia. Memorial markers are installed as far south as Goshen Township in Clermont County.

In 2010, SR 48 within the Loveland city limits was additionally designated as the Captain Seth Mitchell Memorial Highway. Mitchell, a U.S. Marine and Loveland resident, served in the War in Afghanistan and died in a helicopter crash in Helmand Province on October 26, 2009.

In 2016, SR 48 between Mason–Morrow–Millgrove Road (Warren County Road 38) and Interstate 71 in the village of South Lebanon was additionally designated as the SFC Bobby Lee Estle Memorial Highway. Estle, a U.S. Army sergeant first class who was born and raised in Ohio, was a 1991 graduate of Lebanon High School in which he was in the Junior ROTC, and attended the Warren County Career Center. He served in support of Operation Enduring Freedom in the War in Afghanistan and was killed in action in 2012 at the age of 38, ten days before he was due to return home. Throughout his 18-year career in the Army, Estle served two tours in Iraq and two tours in Afghanistan.

In 2020, SR 48 (Far Hills Avenue) between Stroop Road and Dorothy Lane in Kettering was additionally designated as the CWO3 James E. Groves III Memorial Highway. Groves, a U.S. Army chief warrant officer three and instructor pilot, was a Columbus native who moved to Kettering as a child and graduated from that city's Fairmont High School in 1994. Serving in the War in Afghanistan, he was killed at the age of 37 on March 16, 2013, when the helicopter he was piloting crashed due to suspected mechanical failure near Kandahar; another soldier aboard survived the crash. Enlisting in the Army after high school commencement, Groves had served two tours in Iraq and was near the end of his second tour in Afghanistan. Approaching his 19th anniversary in the Army, Groves had planned to retire after a 20-year career.

In 2023, SR 48 (Far Hills Avenue) between David Road and Stroop Road in Kettering was additionally designated as the Sgt. Cameron H. Thomas Memorial Way. Thomas, a 2012 graduate of Fairmont High School, was a U.S. Army Ranger and sniper assigned to Delta Company, 3rd Battalion, 75th Ranger Regiment at Fort Benning, Georgia. Serving in the War in Afghanistan, during his third deployment to that country, he was killed at the age of 23 on April 26, 2017, during a raid by U.S. and Afghan forces on an ISIS-K compound in eastern Afghanistan targeting high-level insurgent leaders. Thomas was posthumously awarded a Purple Heart and a Bronze Star.

In 2023, SR 48 (Far Hills Avenue) between Rahn Road and David Road in Kettering was additionally designated as the Sgt. Kevin J. Lannon Memorial Way. Lannon, a 1980 graduate of Alter High School in Kettering, was a U.S. Army Ranger assigned to the 2nd Ranger Battalion, 75th Ranger Regiment, stationed at Fort Lewis (since consolidated into Joint Base Lewis–McChord), Washington. Deployed during the United States invasion of Grenada, which began at dawn on October 25, 1983, Lannon, at the age of 21, and two other Rangers from his battalion were killed on October 27; these deaths marked the first battlefield casualties since the elite battalion had been formed nine years earlier. Lannon "distinguished himself the first day in Grenada, acting both as an infantryman and as a medic. He took care of wounded Rangers and wounded Cubans alike.", medical officer Capt. Robert E. Kane said at the time.

== History ==
In the early 20th century, SR 48 was assigned to completely unrelated routes within the state. From 1923 to 1927, it was the designation given to Barnesville–Hendrysburg, Barnesville–Woodsfield, and Woodsfield–Sistersville roads in eastern Ohio, now designated SR 800. Present-day SR 48 was previously signed as SR 50, and before that as Dayton–Covington and Dayton–Lebanon roads. (See 1923 Ohio state highway renumbering and 1927 Ohio state highway renumbering).

Beginning in 2022, Oakwood began exploring the creation of a roundabout along a heavily-traveled section of SR 48 (Far Hills Avenue), where the route currently has a complex, six-spoke intersection with Oakwood Avenue and with Thruston Boulevard (despite having six spokes, the junction is locally known as "Five Points"). The city has commissioned studies which, among other improvements, evaluated the roundabout treatment as part of an analysis of the installation and maintenance costs of traffic light replacements along its entire portion of the state route. Oakwood's design plan for the junction envisioned a roundabout with a "dogbone" or "peanut" shape. As of August 2023, the city had decided to seek state and/or federal grant money through ODOT to help pay for the roundabout. On December 4, 2023, despite having been notified by the state that $3 million (more than half the construction costs), were to be made available, the city council unanimously voted to suspend the roundabout project. Mayor Bill Duncan cited lack of clear support by city residents, and other council members mentioned lack of data about the operation of this more-complex-than-usual roundabout design. City Manager Norbert Klopsch stated that the city would maintain the traffic light at this junction for its expected five to ten-year lifespan and revisit the roundabout option at that time.

== Future ==
In 2021, the Ohio Department of Transportation (ODOT) awarded the city of Dayton $4.74 million to place SR 48 (North Main Street) on a "road diet". Dayton, ODOT District 7 and the Miami Valley Regional Planning Commission had hired the engineering firm Burgess & Niple to study the roadway from Great Miami Boulevard in Dayton north to Shiloh Springs Road in Harrison Township, Montgomery County. That section of the street, with some of the most dangerous intersections in the region, from 2015 to 2017, had 900 crashes, 356 of those with injuries and seven with fatalities. The study area was shortened on the north end to Shoup Mill Road in Harrison Township, a distance of 3.5 miles (5.6 km); this stretch between 2017 and 2019 had 760 crashes, 34 involving pedestrians, and a daily traffic count of 18,400 vehicles. The proposed road diet involves converting the roadway from two lanes in each direction to one lane in each direction, with a center turn lane. Curbs are to be extended, allowing for the addition of on-street parking. Also there is to be new lighting and for pedestrians, new signals and refuge islands with improved sidewalks and crosswalks. In addition the plan calls for softening a sharp curve at one of the intersections along the street. Design and review is expected to last through 2022, with right-of-way acquisition in 2023, and construction to begin in summer 2024.

On December 7, 2023, ODOT announced that it would provide a $3.66 million grant to convert the current traffic light-controlled intersection at SR 48 and Lytle-Five Points Road in Clearcreek Township, Warren County to a roundabout in 2028. From 2020 through 2022, that intersection had 23 crashes, 30% of which resulted in injury, one serious and one fatal; 74% of the crashes were rear-end. ODOT's analysis showed that adding left-turn lanes would result in a reduction of 1.5 crashes per year, while a roundabout would result in a reduction of 5 crashes per year.

== Major intersections ==
County	Location	mi	km	Destinations	Notes
Clermont	Goshen Township	0.00	0.00	SR 132 – Goshen, Owensville	
Clermont	Goshen Township	0.98	1.58	SR 28 east – Goshen	Southern end of SR 28 overlap
Clermont	Goshen Township	1.38	2.22	SR 28 west – Milford	Northern end of SR 28 overlap
Warren	Hamilton Township	13.43	21.61	US 22 / SR 3 – Morrow, Montgomery	
Warren	South Lebanon	16.67	26.83	I-71 – Cincinnati, Columbus	I-71 exit 28
Warren	Lebanon	18.31	29.47	Turtle Creek–Union Road, Deerfield Road	Interchange
Warren	Lebanon	20.27	32.62	To US 42 north (SR 48-T) / SR 123 south (Main Street)	Parclo interchange; southern end of SR 123 overlap; southern terminus of unsigned SR 48-T; SR 48 turns west on Main Street; roadway continues as SR 48-T
Warren	Lebanon	21.50	34.60	US 42 south (Broadway) / SR 63 east (Main Street)	Southern end of US 42 overlap
Warren	Lebanon	21.65	34.84	SR 123 north (Silver Street)	Northern end of SR 123 overlap
Warren	Lebanon	21.72	34.95	US 42 north (Warren Street)	Northern end of US 42 overlap
Warren	Clearcreek Township	25.10	40.39	SR 122 – Dodds, Middletown	
Warren	Clearcreek Township	23.08	37.14	SR 73 – Springboro, Waynesville	
Montgomery	Centerville	35.61	57.31	SR 725 west (Franklin Street)	Southern end of SR 725 overlap
Montgomery	Centerville	36.68	59.03	To I-675 south (Alex Bell Road) SR 725 east (Alex Bell Road)	Northern end of SR 725 overlap
Montgomery	Centerville	36.83	59.27	I-675 – Cincinnati, Columbus	I-675 south exit 4, north exits 4A-B
Montgomery	Dayton	44.28	71.26	SR 48 south (Stout Street)	Directional split begins; northbound traffic continues on S. Patterson Boulevard, S. Jefferson Street, and E. Monument Avenue
Montgomery	Dayton	44.55	71.70	US 35 – Xenia, Eaton	
Montgomery	Dayton	45.51	73.24	SR 48 south (W. Monument Avenue)	Directional split ends; southbound traffic continues on W. Monument Avenue, Ludlow Street, and Stout Street
Montgomery	Dayton	45.98	74.00	I-75 / SR 4 – Springfield, Cincinnati, Toledo	I-75 exits 54A–B
Montgomery	Englewood	53.73	86.47	I-70 – Columbus, Indianapolis	I-70 exit 29
Montgomery	Englewood	54.48	87.68	US 40 east (National Road)	Southern end of US 40 overlap
Montgomery	Englewood	54.51	87.73	US 40 west (National Road)	Northern end of US 40 overlap
Miami	West Milton	61.70	99.30	SR 571 east (Tipp Pike)	Southern end of SR 571 overlap
Miami	West Milton	61.73	99.34	SR 571 west (Hayes Street)	Northern end of SR 571 overlap
Miami	Union Township	63.77	102.63	SR 55 east – Troy	Southern end of SR 55 overlap
Miami	Ludlow Falls	64.24	103.38	SR 55 west – Laura	Northern end of SR 55 overlap
Miami	Pleasant Hill	67.84	109.18	SR 718 (Monument Street)	
Miami	Covington	72.24	116.26	SR 41 south (Troy Pike)	Southern end of SR 41 overlap
Miami	Covington	72.71	117.02	US 36 (Broadway Street) / SR 41 ends	Northern end of SR 41 overlap
Miami	Newberry Township	75.78	121.96	SR 185 – Piqua, Versailles	
Shelby	Houston	83.03	133.62	SR 66 – Fort Loramie, Piqua	
1.000 mi = 1.609 km; 1.000 km = 0.621 mi: Concurrency terminus

== In popular culture ==
In I Love Lucy episode #111, "First Stop", the Ricardos and the Mertzes travel this route on their trip to Hollywood, although they were headed to Cincinnati.

== SR 48-T ==
Map of SR 48-T

State Route 48 Temporary (SR 48-T, also called Future SR 48 and Bypass 48) is a 1.87-mile-long (3.01 km) partial bypass of Lebanon running from the SR 48 / SR 123 interchange to an intersection of US 42 and Miller Road. The four-lane divided roadway is a northern continuation of a divided highway segment of SR 48. The route was created by 1971 when a high-speed bypass of Lebanon was created. SR 48-T is not signed as such; the northbound direction is signed as "To US 42 north" and the southbound direction is signed as "To SR 48 south."
