= Ohio State Route 55 =

State highway in western Ohio, US

State Route 55

Route information
- Maintained by ODOT
- Length: 37.867 mi (60.941 km)
- Existed: 1923–present

Major junctions
- West end: SR 571 near Laura
- I-75 in Troy
- East end: US 68 in Urbana

Location
- Country: United States
- State: Ohio
- Counties: Miami, Champaign

Highway system
- Ohio State Highway System; Interstate; US; State; Scenic
← SR 54	→ SR 56

State Route 55 (SR 55) is an east–west state route in western Ohio. Its western terminus is near the town of Laura at SR 571, and its eastern terminus is south of downtown Urbana at U.S. Route 68 (US 68).

== Route description ==
SR 55 starts from an intersection with SR 571 just east of Laura in Union Township. SR 55 starts out in a northeasterly direction by straddling the Ludlow Creek and some woods on the south side, and farmland on the north side, with occasional houses along the way. SR 55 intersects Miami County Road 50, then turns easterly, meeting County Road 9 further east. Bending slightly to the southeast, SR 55 meets Elleman Road, then turns east until it intersects Davis Road, where it shifts to the northeast, and heads into Ludlow Falls. SR 55 maneuvers through this predominantly residential village via Greenville Avenue, Covington Avenue and Friend Street, along which SR 55 meets SR 48 at a T-intersection. Here, SR 55 turns south and departs Ludlow Falls concurrent with SR 48.

SR 55 and SR 48 run together for less than 0.5 miles (0.80 km), crossing Ludlow Creek in the process. SR 55 splits off from SR 48, and resumes an easterly trek through farm country. SR 55 starts to bend northeasterly as it meets Calumet Road, crosses over the Stillwater River, and intersects Kessler-Frederick Road consecutively. Continuing northeasterly, SR 55 has intersections with Greenlee Road and Miami County Road 139. SR 55 departs Union Township, and enters Concord Township, whereupon it meets Horseshoe Bend Road (Miami County Road 39). SR 55 passes an intersection with Miami County Road 132, and then meets Miami County Road 41. At that intersection, SR 55 enters into Troy, and the landscape changes from rural to suburban, with subdivisions dotting the landscape.

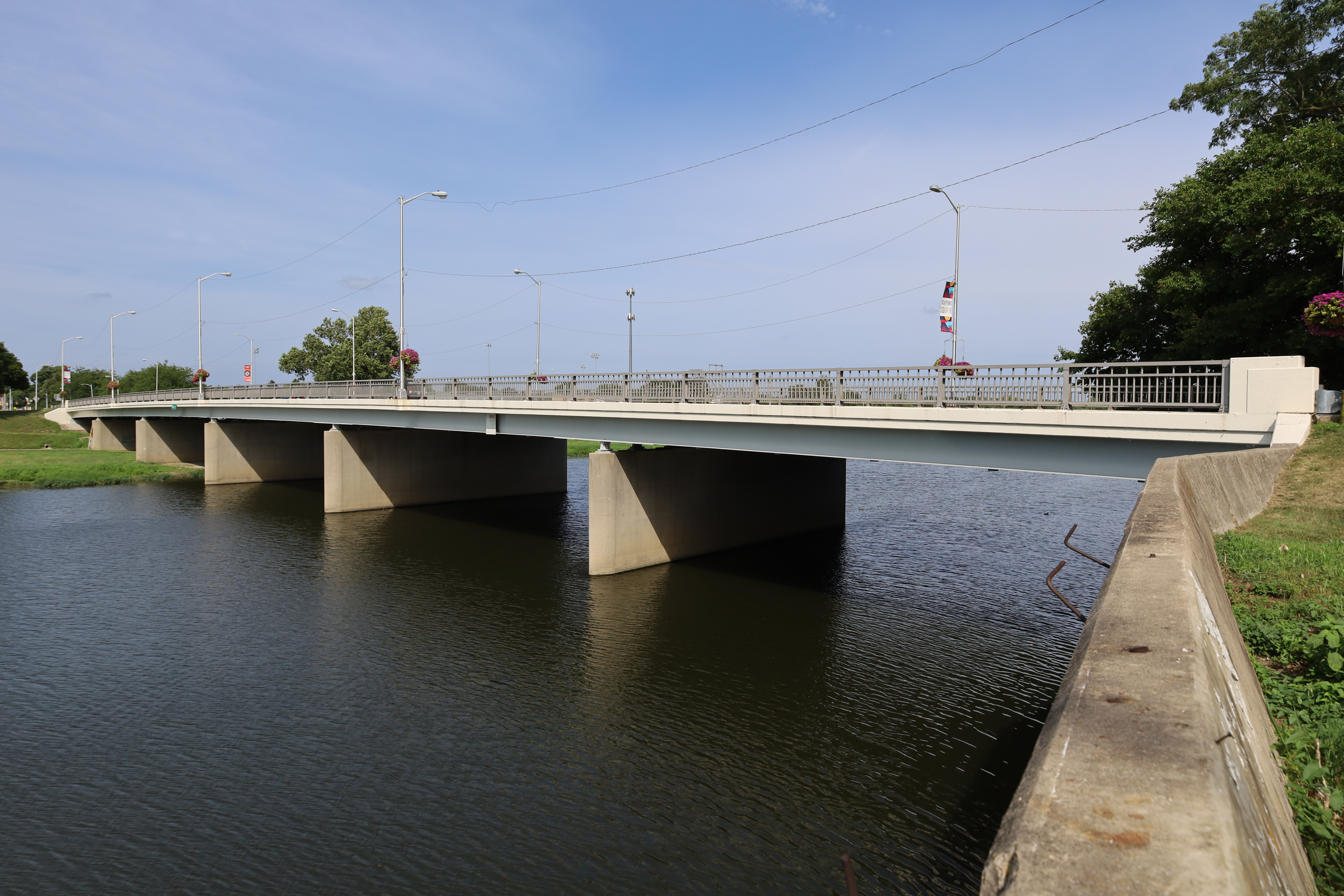
SR 55 crossing the Great Miami River in Troy, Ohio in 2023

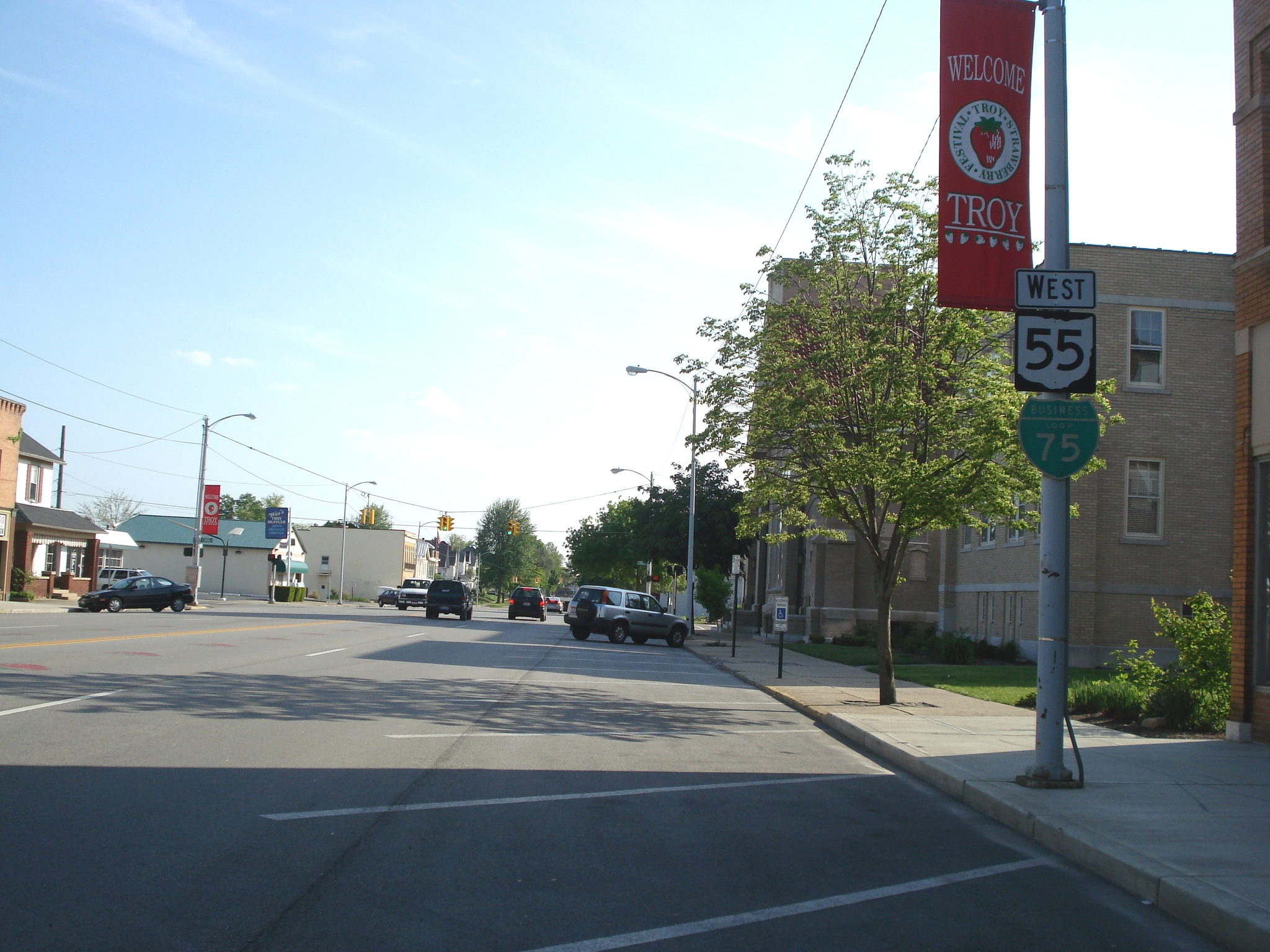
View looking west along westbound SR 55 in downtown Troy. An aged BL I-75 shield accompanies the SR 55 shield shown here.

SR 55 widens out to a four-lane divided highway at the Barnhart Road intersection, where the highway enters into a more commercial area. Following Fenner Road, SR 55 arrives a diamond interchange with Interstate 75 (I-75). East of I-75, SR 55 almost immediately arrives at the eastern terminus of SR 718, a signalized T-intersection. Past SR 718, SR 55 narrows down to two lanes, and enters into a primarily residential portion of Troy along West Market Street. SR 55 meets South Market Street, the former routing of US 25, and turns northeasterly toward the central business district. Once into downtown Troy, SR 55 intersects SR 41 at a traffic circle in Public Square.

Departing from the traffic circle in a northeasterly fashion, SR 55 intersects Water Street, then immediately crosses the Great Miami River. After crossing the river, SR 55 turns easterly onto Staunton Road from Market Street. While passing to the north of the Miami Shores Golf Course, a series of residential subdivisions abut the north side of SR 55. On the outskirts of Troy, SR 55 meets SR 202 at its northern terminus. Entering into Staunton Township, SR 55 starts to trend northeasterly, with the residential setting yielding to a more rural landscape featuring vast amounts of farmland, with the occasional house situated off of the highway. SR 55 intersects Sayers Road, then crosses into Lostcreek Township. After passing Casstown-Sidney Road, SR 55 arrives in Casstown. Entering into town on Troy Pike, SR 55 turns north onto Main Street, and follows Casstown’s main drag up to the SR 589 junction. SR 55 turns easterly onto Addison Street, while SR 589 northbound begins straight ahead at that intersection.

SR 55 departs Casstown, and continues easterly through Lostcreek Township. Turning northeasterly again, SR 55 passes occasional patches of trees amidst the vast farmland. SR 55 intersects Rugged Hill Road, bends back to the east, then meets Sodom Road. Trending more southeasterly at this point, SR 55 arrives at a T-intersection that marks the northern terminus of SR 201. East of there, SR 55 resumes an easterly path, intersecting Alcony-Conover Road, and crossing into Champaign County.

Into Champaign County, SR 55 makes a brief trip through Jackson Township en route to Christiansburg. SR 55 passes through the community along Pike Street, a primarily residential street. Departing Christiansburg to the east, SR 55 re-emerges into rural Jackson Township. Turning northeasterly, SR 55 passes by Panhandle Road, then curves to the east just prior to meeting SR 235. Vast swaths of farmland and the occasional house compose SR 55’s surroundings east of SR 235, as the highway passes by intersections with St. Paris-New Carlisle Road, Heck Road and Dialton Road. SR 55 next enters into Mad River Township. SR 55 passes through the hamlet of Thackery, briefly turning north at the Hampton-Donnellsville Road intersection there before resuming its easterly course. The highway turns southeasterly where it meets Vance Road, then makes a turn to the northeast in the unincorporated community of Terre Haute at the intersection of Coffin Station Road and Storms Creek Road. The northeasterly trend of this two-lane route continues until Rhodes Road, where SR 55 takes on a more east-northeasterly trend through the intersection with Valley Pike, which also serves as the southern terminus of SR 560.

Proceeding eastward, SR 55 meets Bair Road, then turns northeasterly upon crossing over the Mad River. SR 55 then parallels the Mad River for a stretch, intersecting Hickory Grove Road in the process. Curving ever so slightly to the east, SR 55 meets Old Troy Pike. Turning due east, SR 55 enters into Urbana. The rural setting fades, and SR 55 enters into a more commercialized area along, fittingly, Commercial Street. SR 55 meets US 68 at a T-intersection in the southern portion of Urbana and ends.

=== Memorial designations ===
The portion of SR 55 between SR 571 and SR 48 is designated as the "LCpl Marc L. Cole Memorial Highway", in honor of a Milton-Union High School graduate who was killed in the October 23, 1983 barracks bombing in Beirut, Lebanon, while serving in the Marines. This portion of SR 55 passes by Cole's childhood home.

The portion of SR 55 between Troy and Casstown is designated as the "Pfc. Jeffrey L. Rice Memorial Highway", in honor of a Troy High School and Upper Valley Career Center graduate who was killed in Kandahar, Afghanistan, while serving in the Army, on July 19, 2012.

== History ==
The SR 55 that exists today is only a shadow of what it was when first designated in the 1920s. SR 55 came into being in 1923. Its original routing took it from Troy all the way up to Parma. This route encompassed the current alignment of SR 55 between Troy and Urbana, the current US 36 from Urbana to Delaware, the current US 42 from Delaware to Medina, the current SR 3 from Medina to Hinckley, and the current SR 94 from Hinckley to Parma.

In 1926, SR 55 was extended on the western end along a previously unnumbered road to Ludlow Falls. In that same year, however, the advent of the U.S. Highway System resulted in a major truncation of SR 55 on the east side. Its new eastern terminus became SR 4 southwest of Milford Center. SR 55 was further truncated on the east end in 1932, when the coming of US 36 resulted in the relocation of SR 55's eastern terminus to downtown Urbana at the traffic circle of US 36, US 68, and SR 29. SR 55 formerly had a 1.03-mile-long (1.66 km) concurrency with US 68 at its eastern end until it was truncated by 2013.

1937 brought another elongation of SR 55 on the western end. In that year, it was extended from Ludlow Falls to its present western terminus.

== Major intersections ==
County	Location	mi	km	Destinations	Notes
Miami	Union Township	0.000	0.000	SR 571 – West Milton, Laura	
Miami	Ludlow Falls	3.315	5.335	SR 48 north	Western end of SR 48 concurrency
Miami	Union Township	3.786	6.093	SR 48 south – West Milton	Eastern end of SR 48 concurrency
Miami	Troy	9.741– 9.936	15.677– 15.990	I-75 – Dayton, Toledo	Exit 73 (I-75)
Miami	Troy	10.296	16.570	SR 718 west (Arthur Road)	Eastern terminus of SR 718
Miami	Troy	11.694– 11.714	18.820– 18.852	SR 41 (Main Street)	Traffic circle
Miami	Troy	13.010	20.938	SR 202 south	Northern terminus of SR 202
Miami	Casstown	16.083	25.883	SR 589 north (Main Street)	Southern terminus of SR 589
Miami	Lostcreek Township	19.297	31.056	SR 201 south – Dayton	Northern terminus SR 201
Champaign	Jackson Township	23.509	37.834	SR 235 – New Carlisle, Quincy	
Champaign	Mad River Township	32.982	53.079	SR 560 north / Valley Pike	Southern terminus of SR 560
Champaign	Urbana	37.867	60.941	US 68 (South Main Street)	
1.000 mi = 1.609 km; 1.000 km = 0.621 mi: Concurrency terminus
