= Ohio State Route 721 =

State highway in western Ohio, US

State Route 721

Route information
- Maintained by ODOT
- Length: 17.91 mi (28.82 km)
- Existed: 1937–present

Major junctions
- South end: SR 49 near Potsdam
- US 36 near Bradford
- North end: SR 185 near Bradford

Location
- Country: United States
- State: Ohio
- Counties: Miami, Darke

Highway system
- Ohio State Highway System; Interstate; US; State; Scenic
← SR 720	→ SR 722

State Route 721 (SR 721) is a north–south state highway located in the western portion of the U.S. state of Ohio. The southern terminus of SR 721 is at a T-intersection with SR 49 approximately 2.75 miles (4.43 km) south of the village of Potsdam. Its northern terminus is also at a T-intersection, this time with SR 185 on the Darke–Miami County Line nearly 1.50 miles (2.41 km) north of Bradford.

== Route description ==
Along its way, SR 721's path takes it through southwestern Miami County, then along the border between Darke and Miami Counties. There is no section of SR 721 that is included within the National Highway System (NHS). The NHS is a network of highways deemed to be most important for the country's economy, mobility and defense.

== History ==
The SR 721 designation was assigned in 1937. Throughout its history, the route has maintained the same alignment in the general vicinity of the boundary between the counties of Darke and Miami. Originally, SR 721 was an unpaved roadway from its southern terminus at SR 49 to its junction with US 36. The portion from that point through Bradford to its northern terminus at SR 185. One year after its assignment, SR 721 was paved between SR 49 and Laura. By 1940, the remaining gravel portion of the highway between Laura and US 36 was paved.

== Major intersections ==
County	Location	mi	km	Destinations	Notes
Miami	Union Township	0.00	0.00	SR 49 – Dayton, Greenville	
Miami	Laura	5.79	9.32	SR 571 east / Pemberton Road	Southern end of SR 571 concurrency
Miami	Union Township	6.14	9.88	SR 571 west	Northern end of SR 571 concurrency
Miami	Newton Township	9.59	15.43	SR 718 east / CR 74 – Pleasant Hill	Western terminus of SR 718
Darke–Miami county line	Adams–Newberry township line	14.80	23.82	US 36 – Greenville, Covington	
Darke–Miami county line	Adams–Newberry township line	17.91	28.82	SR 185 – Piqua, Versailles	
1.000 mi = 1.609 km; 1.000 km = 0.621 mi: Concurrency terminus
