= Ohio State Route 571 =

State highway in Ohio, US

State Route 571

Route information
- Maintained by ODOT
- Length: 50.51 mi (81.29 km)
- Existed: 1962–present

Major junctions
- West end: SR 28 in Union City at the Indiana state line
- US 36 / US 127 in Greenville; I-75 in Tipp City
- East end: US 40 near New Carlisle

Location
- Country: United States
- State: Ohio
- Counties: Darke, Miami, Clark

Highway system
- Ohio State Highway System; Interstate; US; State; Scenic
← SR 570	→ SR 572
← I-71	→ SR 72

State Route 571 (SR 571) is an east–west state highway in west-central Ohio, part of a statewide road transportation system. It indirectly connects the cities of Union City and Greenville with Springfield via a final 10.7 miles (17.2 km) on U.S. Route 40.

== Route description ==
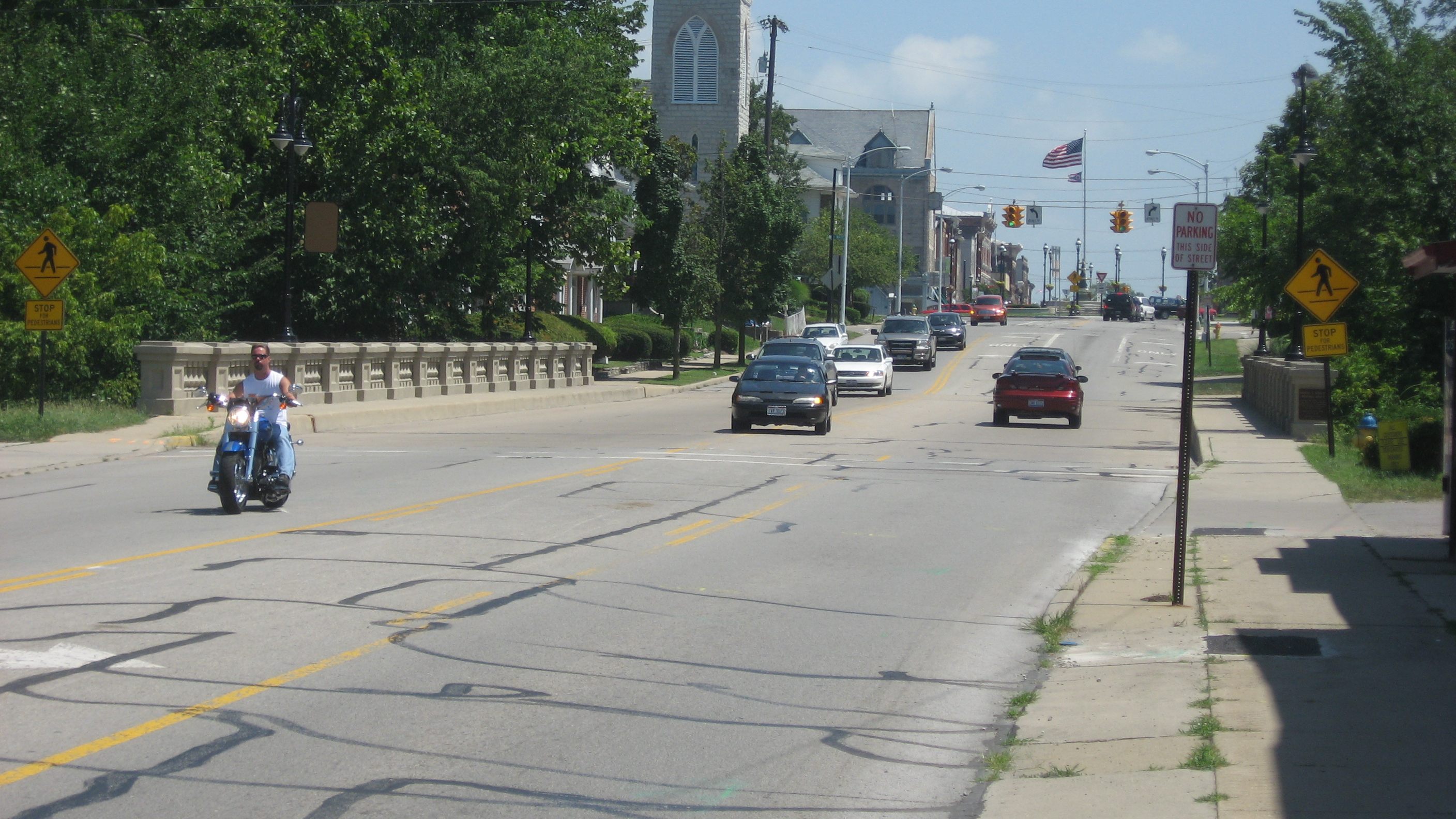
SR 49 and SR 571 cross the Broadway Bridge in Greenville

State Route 571 starts in the Indiana/Ohio border town of Union City. To the west, it turns into Indiana State Route 28, which goes west toward Albany and Alexandria, Indiana. To the east, SR 571 goes southeast through Hill Grove and Coletown, and then parallels Greenville Creek into Greenville. From Greenville it continues southeast through Painter Creek and Laura to West Milton where it turns due east, passes over Interstate 75 to Tipp City and New Carlisle. About 3 miles (4.8 km) southeast of New Carlisle, SR 571 meets U.S. Route 40, the eastern terminus of the state route.

Although no longer a state route, the road keeps on going across US 40 as County Highway 303 (Medway-Carlisle Road) in Clark County. The road continues south, through the village of Medway and further on it turns into the northern terminus of I-675 at I-70.

The portion of SR 571 between Union City and Greenville in Darke County is designated the "196th Light Infantry Brigade SP4 Robert L. Fowble Jr., and PFC Jack E. Beam Memorial Highway", in honor of two U.S. Army soldiers from the same brigade who were killed by enemy fire while fighting in the Vietnam War. Fowble, a Greenville native, died on November 23, 1966. Beam, a Union City native, died on Dec. 21, 1966.

The portion of the route within Miami County is designated the "Robert E. Netzley Highway" in honor of the late former state representative.

== History ==
The Union City-to-Springfield roads have been part of the Ohio state highway system since 1912. Before 1923, numerous highway numbers comprised the current route of SR 571. In 1923, the route between Greenville and then-SR 1 (now US 40); the remainder of the route between Union City and Greenville was the westernmost segment of SR 29. By 1932, SR 29 was truncated to Urbana with US 36 taking over its former route between Greenville and Urbana; SR 71 was also extended from Greenville to the Indiana state line in Union City. By 1939, the entire length of SR 71 had been paved.

Following the extension to Union City, no major changes to the routing of SR 71 and SR 571 have been made. The only change to the highway came in 1962 when Ohio renumbered state highways that shared route numbers with proposed Interstates. Because of I-71, SR 71 was renumbered to SR 571.

An unrelated SR 571 was in existence from 1937 to 1957 in Bridgewater Township, Williams County. This SR 571 ran from US 20 to the Michigan state line. In 1957, SR 576 was extended north and took over the 4-mile-long (6.4 km) highway.

== Future ==
In December 2023, the Ohio Department of Transportation (ODOT) revealed that it planned to replace the current flashing traffic-light-controlled intersection of SR 571 and SR 201 in Bethel Township, Miami County with a single-lane roundabout, pending funding. This safety improvement was prompted by a March 2023 incident in which a semi-trailer crashed into a house near the junction, resulting in significant damage to, and eventual removal of the house. The homeowner reported that the house had been struck twice in the 1960s and 1970s, with heavy damage in 1982; an additional collision, without significant injury, took place there in December 2023.

== Major intersections ==
County	Location	mi	km	Destinations	Notes
Darke	Union City	0.00	0.00	SR 28 (West Chestnut Street) to SR 32 / Stateline Road	Indiana state line
Darke	Greenville	11.23	18.07	SR 49 north	Western end of SR 49 concurrency
Darke	Greenville	11.62	18.70	SR 118 north (Broadway)	Western terminus of SR 118
Darke	Greenville	11.91	19.17	SR 118 ends / SR 121 north / SR 502 west (Main Street)	Eastern end of SR 118 concurrency; western end of SR 121 concurrency; eastern terminus of SR 502
Darke	Greenville	12.18	19.60	SR 49 south / SR 121 south (Washington Street)	Eastern end of SR 49 / SR 121 concurrency
Darke	Greenville	13.32– 13.51	21.44– 21.74	US 36 / US 127 – Eaton, Celina, Piqua	Interchange
Miami	Union Township	25.96	41.78	SR 721 north	Western end of SR 721 concurrency
Miami	Laura	26.31	42.34	SR 721 south (North Main Street) / Pemberton Road	Eastern end of SR 721 concurrency
Miami	Union Township	27.17	43.73	SR 55 east – Ludlow Falls	Western terminus of SR 55
Miami	West Milton	31.25	50.29	SR 48 north (North Miami Street)	Western end of SR 48 concurrency
Miami	West Milton	31.29	50.36	SR 48 south (North Miami Street)	Eastern end of SR 48 concurrency
Miami	Tipp City	38.82	62.47	I-75 – Dayton, Troy	Exit 68 (I-75)
Miami	Bethel Township	41.85	67.35	SR 202 – Dayton, Troy	
Miami	Bethel Township	44.96	72.36	SR 201	
Clark	New Carlisle	48.13	77.46	SR 235 (Main Street)	
Clark	Bethel Township	50.52	81.30	US 40 / CR 303 (Medway New Carlisle Road) – Springfield, Vandalia	
1.000 mi = 1.609 km; 1.000 km = 0.621 mi: Concurrency terminus
