= Ohio State Route 589 =

State highway in western Ohio, US

State Route 589

Route information
- Maintained by ODOT
- Length: 16.67 mi (26.83 km)
- Existed: 1937–present

Major junctions
- South end: SR 55 in Casstown
- US 36 in Fletcher
- North end: SR 29 near Sidney

Location
- Country: United States
- State: Ohio
- Counties: Miami, Shelby

Highway system
- Ohio State Highway System; Interstate; US; State; Scenic
← SR 588	→ SR 590

State Route 589 (SR 589) is a north–south state highway in the western part of the U.S. state of Ohio. SR 589's southern terminus is at SR 55 in the village of Casstown. The northern terminus of SR 589 is at a T-intersection with SR 29 approximately 5.50 miles (8.85 km) southeast of the city limits of Sidney.

== Route description ==
SR 589 runs through northeastern Miami County and southeastern Shelby County along its way. No part of SR 589 is included as a part of the National Highway System, a system of routes considered to be most important for the economy, mobility and defense of the nation.

== History ==
When it was designated in 1937, SR 589 appeared only along its current northern segment between US 36 east of Fletcher and its current northern terminus at what was then designated SR 54 (now SR 29). One year later, SR 589 was extended westerly from its previous southern terminus along US 36 to Fletcher, then south to its current southern terminus at SR 55 in Casstown.

== Major intersections ==
County	Location	mi	km	Destinations	Notes
Miami	Casstown	0.00	0.00	SR 55 (North Main Street / Addison Street)	
Miami	Fletcher	6.48	10.43	US 36 west (West Main Street) / Walnut Street	Southern end of US 36 concurrency
Miami	Brown Township	8.95	14.40	US 36 east / Sodom-Ballou Road	Northern end of US 36 concurrency
Shelby	Green Township	16.67	26.83	SR 29	
1.000 mi = 1.609 km; 1.000 km = 0.621 mi: Concurrency terminus
