= Ohio State Route 71 =

State Route 71

Route information
- Maintained by ODOT

Location
- Country: United States
- State: Ohio

Highway system
- Ohio State Highway System; Interstate; US; State; Scenic
← I-71	→ SR 72

In Ohio, State Route 71 may refer to:

- Interstate 71 in Ohio, the only Ohio highway numbered 71 since about 1962
- Ohio State Route 71 (1923), now SR 571
