= Ohio State Route 36 =

State Route 36

Route information
- Maintained by ODOT

Location
- Country: United States
- State: Ohio

Highway system
- Ohio State Highway System; Interstate; US; State; Scenic
← US 36	→ SR 37

In Ohio, State Route 36 may refer to:

- U.S. Route 36 in Ohio, the only Ohio highway numbered 36 since about 1932
- Ohio State Route 36 (1923), now SR 585 (Wooster to Akron), SR 59 (Akron to Ravenna), and SR 5 (Ravenna to Pennsylvania)
