= Ohio State Route 718 =

State highway in Miami County, Ohio, US

State Route 718

Route information
- Maintained by ODOT
- Length: 10.62 mi (17.09 km)
- Existed: 1937–present

Major junctions
- West end: SR 721 west of Pleasant Hill
- East end: SR 55 in Troy

Location
- Country: United States
- State: Ohio
- Counties: Miami

Highway system
- Ohio State Highway System; Interstate; US; State; Scenic
← SR 716	→ SR 719

Ohio State Route 718 (SR 718) is a state route in western Ohio. All of SR 718 is situated within western Miami County. The western terminus of SR 718 is at SR 721 west of Pleasant Hill and its eastern terminus is at SR 55 in Troy, near the SR 55 interchange of Interstate 75.

== Route description ==
SR 718 begins at an intersection with SR 721 and County Road 74 (CR 74) in an area west of Pleasant Hill. The route heads eastward, passing homes and fields for a stretch. The terrain in this area is flat with little changes in elevation. SR 718 continues on, intersecting CR 69 and CR 9. The route crosses the Stillwater River, and enters the village of Pleasant Hill. SR 718 passes Pleasant Hill Cemetery and intersects local roads in Pleasant Hill, until an intersection with SR 48.

The route turns to the southeast as it leaves Pleasant Hill. The road is mainly rural fields for the next several miles, turning to the southeast once more as it nears Troy. SR 718 enters Troy soon after, crossing over Interstate 75, and terminating at an intersection with SR 55.

== History ==
SR 718 was assigned to its current routing in 1937. No significant changes have taken place to SR 718 since its inception.

== Major intersections ==
The entire route is in Miami County.

Location	mi	km	Destinations	Notes
Newton Township	0.00	0.00	SR 721 / Greenville-Pleasant Hill Road – Laura, Bradford	
Pleasant Hill	3.76	6.05	SR 48 (Main Street)	
Troy	10.62	17.09	SR 55 (West Market Street)	
1.000 mi = 1.609 km; 1.000 km = 0.621 mi
