= U.S. Route 36 in Ohio =

Segment of American highway

U.S. Route 36
- US 36 highlighted in red

Route information
- Maintained by ODOT
- Length: 208.501 mi (335.550 km)
- Existed: 1932–present

Major junctions
- West end: US 36 west of Palestine
- US 127 in Greenville; I-75 in Piqua; US 68 in Urbana; US 33 in Marysville; US 23 / US 42 in Delaware; US 42 in Delaware; I-71 west of Berkshire; I-77 east of Newcomerstown
- East end: US 250 / SR 800 in Uhrichsville

Location
- Country: United States
- State: Ohio
- Counties: Darke, Miami, Champaign, Union, Delaware, Knox, Coshocton, Tuscarawas

Highway system
- United States Numbered Highway System; List; Special; Divided; Ohio State Highway System; Interstate; US; State; Scenic
← US 35	→ SR 37

U.S. Route 36 (US 36) in the state of Ohio runs from the Indiana state line near Palestine to the highway's eastern terminus at US 250 and State Route 800 (SR 800) in Uhrichsville. US 36 intersects several major highways in the state, including Interstate 75 (I-75), I-71, and I-77.

== Route description ==
=== Indiana state line to Delaware ===
Starting at the state line, US 36 travels east on a somewhat straight line, entering the village of Palestine. South of Greenville, US 36 intersects SR 121 before meeting US 127. US 36 then travels north concurrently with US 127, meeting SR 49 and bypassing downtown Greenville. US 36 leaves US 127 at an interchange with SR 571. Westbound US 36 traffic on that interchange briefly runs concurrently with the state route.

Between Greenville and Covington, US 36 parallels the Greenville Creek. Along its course, the route serves Gettysburg and Bradford (via SR 721). After crossing the Stillwater River in Covington, US 36 intersects with SR 41/SR 48. US 36 then travels due northeast straight to Piqua. The route intersects with SR 185 west of downtown Piqua, SR 66 in the downtown area, and I-75 east of the Great Miami River. US 36 then travels on a somewhat straight route toward Urbana, serving SR 589 between Fletcher and west of Conover, Lena, SR 235, St. Paris, SR 560 in Westville, SR 29 between west and east of downtown Urbana, US 68 in downtown, and SR 54 east of downtown. East of Urbana, US 36 begins to wind a little bit. The route then meets SR 814 and SR 559.

Between Irwin and Marysville, US 36 runs concurrently with SR 4. The only town in between the two municipalities is Milford Center. West of Marysville, both routes merge onto US 33 at a trumpet/parclo hybrid. North of the city, after meeting SR 31, SR 4 leaves the expressway bypass. At the next exit, US 36 also leaves the expressway. On its way to Delaware, US 36 meets New Dover, Ostrader, and SR 257. Between the Ohio Wesleyan University and the Olentangy River in Delaware, US 36 meets US 23/US 42, beginning a short concurrency with US 42. After crossing the river, US 42 turns north from US 36.

=== Delaware to Uhrichsville ===
After leaving the downtown area of Delaware, SR 37 begins running along US 36 all the way to Sunbury. Shortly after that intersection, both routes intersect with SR 521 at a shopping mall. As the road approaches Berkshire, both routes meet I-71. In Sunbury, US 36 leaves SR 37 to travel from southeast to northeast along SR 3. After this intersection, both US 36 and SR 3 meet SR 67. On their way northeast to Mt. Vernon, both routes meet Centerburg, SR 657, Mt. Liberty, Bangs, and SR 229 (beginning of its concurrency). After the latter intersection, the road curves eastward toward downtown Mt. Vernon. Southbound SR 13 travels two blocks east along the concurrency from Sandusky to Mulberry streets. Eastbound SR 229 also leaves at Mulberry Street. Shortly after the intersection, US 36, SR 3, and westbound SR 229 travel through a traffic circle.

For the remainder of its course through Mt. Vernon, US 36 travels from High Street to Coshocton Avenue via Park Street. In the outskirts, US 36 meets SR 768. On its way to Coshocton, US 36 somewhat meanders eastward due to the Kokosing and the Walhonding rivers. Along its way, the route meets SR 308, Howard, US 62 via streets in Millwood, SR 715, SR 229 (again) and SR 206 near Newcastle, SR 79 and SR 715 (again) in Nellie, and SR 36 in Warsaw. At the intersection of SR 16/SR 83 around Coshocton, US 36 travels northeast along the road (SR 16 also ends there). At the next intersection across the river, SR 83 branches off north. At this point, the remainder of US 36 parallels the Tuscarawas River.

US 36 went on to meander east and meet SR 621 in Canal Lewisville, SR 93 north of West Lafayette, SR 751, SR 258 in Newcomerstown, and I-77. In Newcomerstown, US 36 begins heading northeast to Uhrichsville. For its remainder of the route, US 36 meets Port Washington, SR 416 in Gnadenhutten, Riverside Park, and Tuscarawas. As US 36 became an expressway bypass in Uhrichsville, US 36 ends at a parclo interchange with US 250/SR 800. Thru traffic on the expressway would continue as US 250 and SR 800.

== History ==
In 1931, US 36 was extended from Indianapolis to Cadiz, superseding SR 200, SR 29 from Greenville to Urbana, SR 55 from Urbana to SR 4, SR 32 from Marysville to Delaware, SR 95 from Mt. Vernon to Coshocton, SR 16 from Coshocton to Uhrichsville. By 1974, US 36 was truncated from Cadiz to Uhrichsville.

== Major intersections ==
County	Location	mi	km	Destinations	Notes
Darke	Liberty Township	0.00	0.00	US 36 west	Continuation into Indiana
Darke	Neave Township	8.360	13.454	SR 121 – Fairgrounds	
Darke	Neave Township	9.610	15.466	US 127 south – Eaton	Western end of US 127 concurrency
Darke	Greenville Township	10.430	16.785	SR 49 – Greenville, Arcanum	Interchange
Darke	Greenville	13.080	21.050	US 127 north / SR 571 – Celina, Greenville, West Milton	Interchange; eastern end of US 127 concurrency
Darke–Miami county line	Adams Township	22.750	36.613	SR 721	
Miami	Covington	28.645	46.100	SR 41 south / SR 48 (High Street)	Northern terminus of SR 41
Miami	Piqua	31.679	50.982	SR 185 west (Sunset Drive)	Eastern terminus of SR 185
Miami	Piqua	33.330	53.639	I-75 BL (Main Street)	Unsigned. Former US 25.
Miami	Piqua	33.551	53.995	SR 66 north (Spring Street) / East Ash Street	Southern terminus of SR 66
Miami	Piqua	34.453– 34.593	55.447– 55.672	I-75 – Dayton, Toledo	Interchange; I-75 exit 82
Miami	Fletcher	40.298	64.853	SR 589 south (South Walnut Street)	Western end of SR 589 concurrency
Miami	Brown Township	42.773	68.836	SR 589 north / Sodom-Bollou Road	Eastern end of SR 589 concurrency
Champaign	Johnson Township	46.957	75.570	SR 235 – Kiser Lake	
Champaign	Westville	55.182	88.807	SR 560	
Champaign	Urbana	59.073	95.069	SR 29 west (North Oakland Street)	Western end of SR 29 concurrency
Champaign	Urbana	14.957	24.071	US 68 (Main Street)	Traffic circle
Champaign	Urbana	60.537	97.425	SR 54 south (South Jefferson Avenue) / North Jefferson Avenue	Northern terminus of SR 54
Champaign	Urbana	60.911	98.027	SR 29 east (Scioto Street)	Eastern end of SR 29 concurrency
Champaign	Union Township	64.265	103.424	SR 814 north (North Ludlow Road)	Southern terminus of SR 814
Champaign	Rush Township	72.145	116.106	SR 559	
Union	Union Township	75.587	121.645	SR 4 south – Springfield	Western end of SR 4 concurrency
Union	Marysville	83.633	134.594	US 33 west / Northwest Parkway to SR 245 west – Bellefontaine, Marysville, North Lewisburg	Western end of US 33 concurrency
Union	Marysville	85.360	137.374	SR 31 (Maple Street) – Kenton	Interchange; exit 91
Union	Marysville	85.730	137.969	SR 4 north (Main Street) – Marion	Eastern end of SR 4 concurrency; exit 92
Union	Marysville	86.871	139.805	US 33 east / Delaware Avenue – Columbus, Marysville	Eastern end of US 33 concurrency
Delaware	Scioto Township	97.720	157.265	SR 257 – Warrensburg	
Delaware	Delaware	103.144	165.994	US 23 south / US 42 south – Columbus, Plain City	Western end of US 42 concurrency; southbound entrance to and northbound exit from US 23/US 42
Delaware	Delaware	103.375	166.366	US 42 north (Lake Street)	Eastern end of US 42 concurrency
Delaware	Delaware	103.932	167.262	SR 37 west (Central Avenue) / East Point Crossing	Western end of SR 37 concurrency
Delaware	Delaware	104.489	168.159	SR 521 east (Kilbourne Road)	Western terminus of SR 521
Delaware	Berkshire Township	110.663– 110.786	178.095– 178.293	I-71 – Columbus, Cleveland	I-71 exit 131
Delaware	Sunbury	114.488	184.251	SR 3 south / SR 37 east (West Cherry Street) – Columbus, Sunbury	Eastern end of SR 37 concurrency; western end of SR 3 concurrency
Delaware	Berkshire Township	114.912	184.933	SR 61 north – Mount Gilead	Southern terminus of SR 61
Knox	Centerburg	125.151	201.411	SR 314 north (Johnsville Road) – Sparta	Southern terminus of SR 314
Knox	Hilliar Township	126.241	203.165	SR 657 south (Vanatta Road)	Northern terminus of SR 657
Knox	Mount Vernon	137.911	221.946	SR 229 west (Old Delaware Road)	Eastern end of SR 37 concurrency; western end of SR 3 concurrency
Knox	Mount Vernon	138.871	223.491	SR 13 north (Sandusky Street)	Western end of SR 13 (southbound) concurrency
Knox	Mount Vernon	138.991	223.684	SR 13 south / SR 229 east (Mulberry Street) to SR 586 / SR 661	One-way street (southbound); eastern end of SR 13 (southbound) and SR 229 (eastbound) concurrencies
Knox	Mount Vernon	139.131	223.910	SR 3 north (Main Street)	Public Square; eastern end of SR 3 concurrency
Knox	Mount Vernon	139.171	223.974	SR 13 north / SR 229 east (Gay Street)	One-way street (northbound only); eastern end of SR 229 (westbound) concurrency
Knox	Mount Vernon	140.721	226.468	SR 768 north (Vernonview Drive) to SR 3 north	Southern terminus of SR 768
Knox	Monroe Township	143.281	230.588	SR 308 south (Kenyon Road) – Gambier, Kenyon College	Northern terminus of SR 308
Knox	Millwood	150.801	242.691	Bridge Street to US 62 – Danville, Martinsburg	
Knox	Union Township	152.061	244.718	SR 715 east (Walholding Road) – Mohawk Dam	Western terminus of SR 715
Coshocton	Newcastle	157.991	254.262	SR 229 west – Mount Vernon	Eastern terminus of SR 229
Coshocton	Newcastle	158.661	255.340	SR 206 south	Western end of SR 206 concurrency
Coshocton	Newcastle	159.101	256.048	SR 206 north	Eastern end of SR 206 concurrency
Coshocton	Nellie	164.191	264.240	SR 79 south – Newark	Northern terminus of SR 229
Coshocton	Nellie	164.371	264.529	SR 715 west – Mohawk Dam	Eastern terminus of SR 715
Coshocton	Warsaw	167.461	269.502	SR 60 south (Bridge Street) – Dresden	Western end of SR 60 concurrency
Coshocton	Bethlehem Township	169.971	273.542	SR 60 north	Eastern end of SR 60 concurrency
Coshocton	Coshocton	176.291	283.713	SR 16 west / SR 83 south – Coshocton, Roscoe Village	Western end of SR 83 concurrency; eastern terminus of SR 16
Coshocton	Coshocton	176.641	284.276	SR 83 north – Millersburg	Eastern end of SR 83 concurrency
Coshocton	Canal Lewisville	178.731	287.640	SR 621 north	Southern terminus of SR 621
Coshocton	Lafayette Township	183.641	295.542	SR 93 – Pearl, West Lafayette	
Coshocton	Oxford Township	187.351	301.512	SR 751 – Stone Creek, West Lafayette	
Tuscarawas	Newcomerstown	191.727	308.555	CR 21 / College Street – Newcomerstown	Interchange
Tuscarawas	Newcomerstown	192.289	309.459	SR 258 east – Newcomerstown	Western terminus of SR 258
Tuscarawas	Newcomerstown	194.222	312.570	I-77 – Cleveland, Marietta	I-77 exit 65
Tuscarawas	Gnadenhutten	202.296	325.564	SR 416 north – Tuscarawas	Southern terminus of SR 416
Tuscarawas	Uhrichsville	207.255	333.545	Trenton Avenue	Interchange
Tuscarawas	Uhrichsville	208.061	334.842	US 250 west / SR 800 north (Water Street) – New Philadelphia, Uhrichsville	Interchange
Tuscarawas	Uhrichsville	208.501	335.550	US 250 east / SR 800 south – Cadiz, Dennison	Eastern terminus of US 36
1.000 mi = 1.609 km; 1.000 km = 0.621 mi: Concurrency terminus; Incomplete access
