= Ohio State Route 560 =

State highway in Champaign County, Ohio, US

State Route 560

Route information
- Maintained by ODOT
- Length: 9.97 mi (16.05 km)
- Existed: 1937–present

Major junctions
- West end: SR 55 / CR 15 near Urbana
- US 36 near Urbana
- East end: SR 29 near Rosewood

Location
- Country: United States
- State: Ohio
- Counties: Champaign

Highway system
- Ohio State Highway System; Interstate; US; State; Scenic
← SR 559	→ SR 561

State Route 560 (SR 560) is a 9.97-mile-long (16.05 km) north–south state highway in the western portion of Ohio, a U.S. state. SR 560 has its southern terminus at SR 55 approximately 3.50 miles (5.63 km) southwest of the county seat of Urbana. The northern terminus of the state route is at a T-intersection with SR 29 nearly 6 miles (9.7 km) southeast of the hamlet of Rosewood.

Created in the late 1930s, SR 560 is a two-lane highway that runs through primarily rural terrain to the west and northwest of Urbana.

== Route description ==
All of State Route 560 is situated within Champaign County. No part of this state highway is inclusive within the National Highway System. It runs through the western part of the state, with its southern end at SR 55 and its northern end at SR 29. The highway has been in existence since 1937 and is maintained by ODOT. Some major junctions on SR 560 include: SR 55 near Urbana, US 36 near Urbana, and SR 29 near Rosewood.

== History ==
The first designation of SR 560 took place in 1937. It was routed along the path that it currently maintains, and it has not experienced any major changes since its inception. The route had been fully paved by 1940.

== Major intersections ==
The entire route is in Champaign County.

Location	mi	km	Destinations	Notes
Mad River Township	0.00	0.00	SR 55 / CR 15 (Valley Pike)	
Mad River Township	2.76	4.44	US 36	
Concord Township	9.97	16.05	SR 29	
1.000 mi = 1.609 km; 1.000 km = 0.621 mi
