= Ohio State Route 502 =

State highway in Darke County, Ohio, US

State Route 502

Route information
- Maintained by ODOT
- Length: 9.71 mi (15.63 km)
- Existed: 1937–present

Major junctions
- West end: Indiana State Line near Union City
- East end: SR 49 / SR 118 / SR 121 / SR 571 in Greenville

Location
- Country: United States
- State: Ohio
- Counties: Darke

Highway system
- Ohio State Highway System; Interstate; US; State; Scenic
← SR 501	→ SR 503

State Route 502 (SR 502) is an east–west state highway in western Ohio, a U.S. state. The western terminus of the highway is at the Indiana state line approximately six miles (9.7 km) south of Union City, with the road continuing into the Hoosier State being locally maintained Greenville Pike. The eastern terminus of the highway is in downtown Greenville at a traffic circle where it meets a conglomeration of four other state highways: SR 49, 118, 121 and 571.

SR 502 was established in the late 1930s. It primarily connects rural areas of west-central Darke County with the county seat of Greenville.

== Route description ==
The entirety of SR 502 is located within Darke County. The state highway is not included as a component of the National Highway System.

SR 502 begins at the Indiana state line at the State Line Road intersection. The road entering into the intersection from the Indiana side is locally maintained Greenville Pike. SR 502 runs due east from the state line into Washington Township, traversing primarily rolling farmlands, with the occasional house and clump of trees along the way. The highway passes Stocksdale Road and Springhill Road, then passes by a more concentrated area of trees prior to intersecting Hillgrove-Southern Road. The highway alternates passing through farmland and a small forest before re-emerging into open farmland as it makes its way to Palestine-Union City Road. For the next two miles (3.2 km), SR 502 passes some small patches of trees while primarily passing through open farm country. In that stretch, the highway intersects Noll Road and then goes on to meet New Madison-Coletown Road, where it crosses from Washington Township into Greenville Township.

Into Greenville Township, the route soon curves to the east-southeast. After passing intersections with Shade Road and Heller Road, the highway meets Greenville-Nashville Road, then bends to the east-northeast. Next, SR 502 passes Daly Road and Bakers Store-Greenville Road, after which it turns back to the east. The route soon enters into the city of Greenville. Now known as Winchester Avenue, SR 502 starts to turn southeast as it crosses railroad tracks, then becomes known as Vine Street as it enters into a residential neighborhood. At the Main Street intersection, SR 502 turns onto Main Street heading northeasterly. It meets Elm Street at a four-way stop intersection, then crosses from a residential area into the central business district. After meeting Sycamore Street at a traffic signal, SR 502 arrives at its endpoint one block later at a traffic circle where it meets SRSR 49, SR 118, SR 121, and SR 571.

== History ==
SR 502 was first designated in 1937. It was routed along the alignment that it maintains to this day. There have been no changes of major significance to the routing of the highway since its creation.

== Major intersections ==
The entire route is in Darke County.

Location	mi	km	Destinations	Notes
Washington Township	0.00	0.00	Greenville Pike	Indiana state line
Greenville	9.71	15.63	SR 49 / SR 118 / SR 121 / SR 571 (Broadway / Main Street)	Traffic circle; southern terminus of SR 118
1.000 mi = 1.609 km; 1.000 km = 0.621 mi
