= Fletcher, Ohio =

- Village
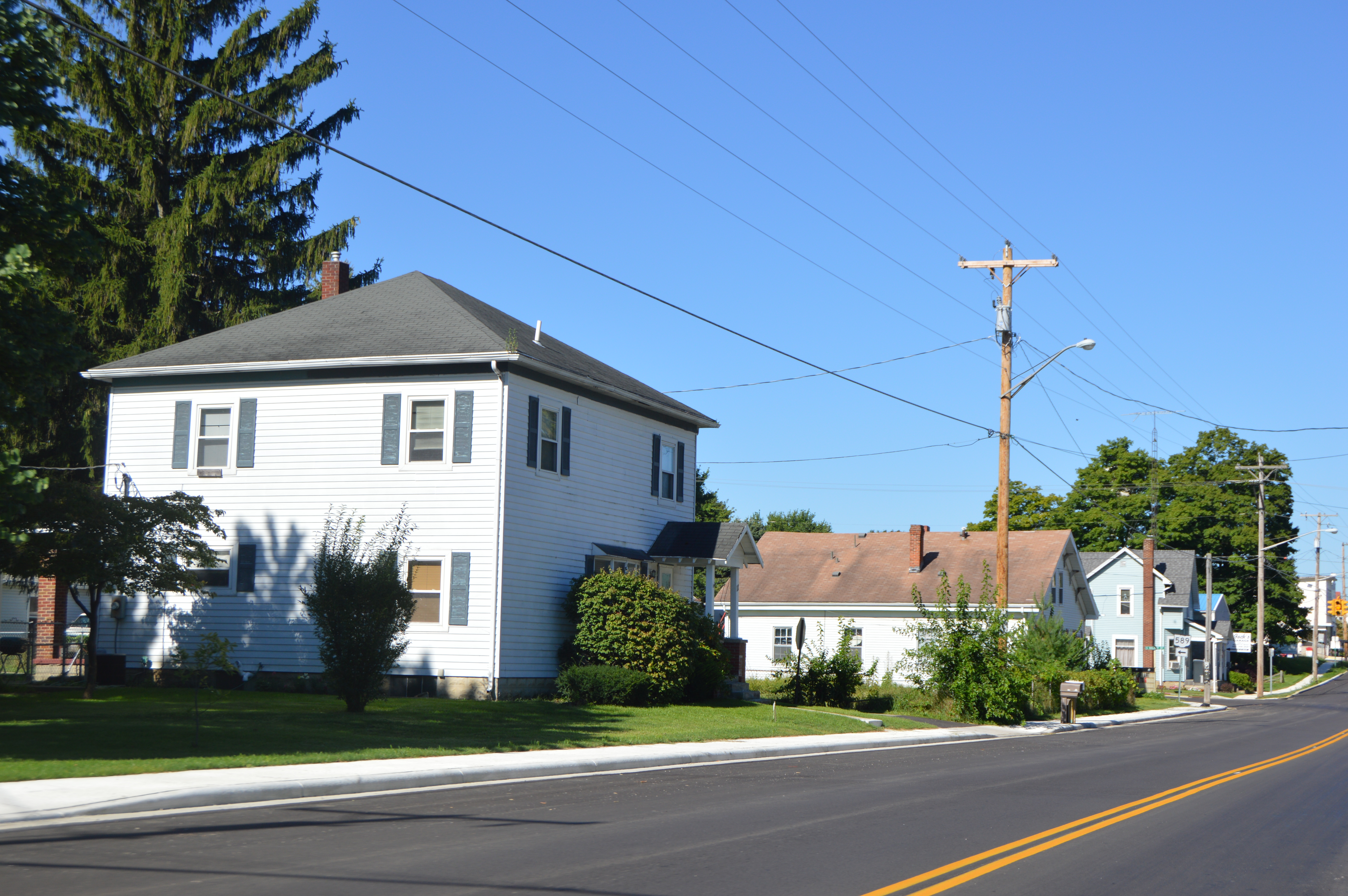
- Houses on Main Street

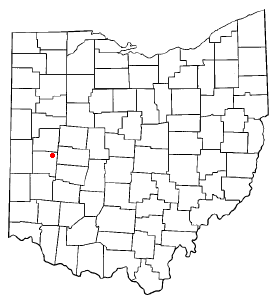
- Location of Fletcher, Ohio

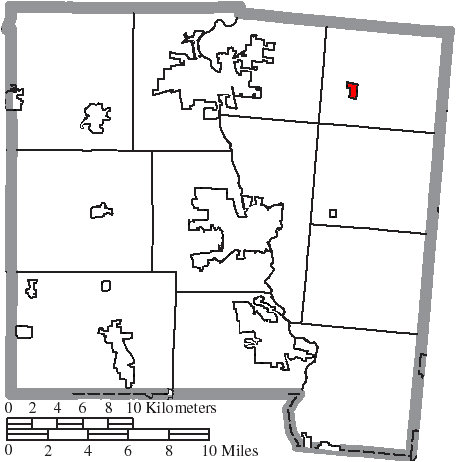
- Location of Fletcher in Miami County
- Coordinates: 40°08′30″N 84°06′43″W
- Country: United States
- State: Ohio
- County: Miami
- Township: Brown

Government
  - Type: Mayor with 6 Council Members
  - Mayor: Jason Hutson

Area
  - Total: 0.31 sq mi (0.80 km^{2})
  - Land: 0.31 sq mi (0.80 km^{2})
  - Water: 0 sq mi (0.00 km^{2})
- Elevation: 1,053 ft (321 m)

Population (2020)
  - Total: 458
  - Estimate (2023): 458
  - Density: 1,451.2/sq mi (560.32/km^{2})
- Time zone: UTC-5 (Eastern (EST))
  - Summer (DST): UTC-4 (EDT)
- ZIP code: 45326
- Area codes: 937, 326
- FIPS code: 39-27412
- GNIS feature ID: 2398885
- Website: https://fletcherohio.us/

Fletcher is a village in Miami County, Ohio, United States. The population was 451 at the 2020 census. It is part of the Dayton Metropolitan Statistical Area and is located east of Piqua.

== History ==
Fletcher was platted in 1830. The village was named after Samuel Fletcher, a local storekeeper. The post office that had been in operation at Fletcher since 1831 closed in 2010.

== Geography ==
According to the United States Census Bureau, the village has a total area of 0.31 square miles (0.80 km^{2}), all land. Fletcher is drained by East Branch Lost Creek and West Branch Lost Creek.

The village is crossed by U.S. Route 36 and State Route 589.

== Demographics ==
Historical population
Census	Pop.	Note	%±
1850	246		—
1860	298		21.1%
1870	306		2.7%
1880	384		25.5%
1900	375		—
1910	376		0.3%
1920	369		−1.9%
1930	407		10.3%
1940	436		7.1%
1950	515		18.1%
1960	569		10.5%
1970	539		−5.3%
1980	498		−7.6%
1990	545		9.4%
2000	510		−6.4%
2010	473		−7.3%
2020	451		−4.7%
2023 (est.)	458	▲	1.6%
U.S. Decennial Census

=== 2010 census ===
As of the census of 2010, there were 473 people, 175 households, and 133 families living in the village. The population density was 1,525.8 inhabitants per square mile (589.1/km^{2}). There were 197 housing units at an average density of 635.5 per square mile (245.4/km^{2}). The racial makeup of the village was 97.0% White, 0.2% Native American, 0.6% from other races, and 2.1% from two or more races. Hispanic or Latino of any race were 0.8% of the population.

There were 175 households, of which 40.6% had children under the age of 18 living with them, 56.6% were married couples living together, 11.4% had a female householder with no husband present, 8.0% had a male householder with no wife present, and 24.0% were non-families. 20.0% of all households were made up of individuals, and 8.6% had someone living alone who was 65 years of age or older. The average household size was 2.70 and the average family size was 3.06.

The median age in the village was 36 years. 27.7% of residents were under the age of 18; 8.1% were between the ages of 18 and 24; 26.4% were from 25 to 44; 24.9% were from 45 to 64; and 12.9% were 65 years of age or older. The gender makeup of the village was 51.6% male and 48.4% female.

=== 2000 census ===
As of the census of 2000, there were 510 people, 189 households, and 144 families living in the village. The population density was 1,651.8 inhabitants per square mile (637.8/km^{2}). There were 207 housing units at an average density of 670.5 per square mile (258.9/km^{2}). The racial makeup of the village was 98.04% White, 0.59% African American, 0.78% Native American, and 0.59% from two or more races. Hispanic or Latino of any race were 0.59% of the population.

There were 189 households, out of which 37.6% had children under the age of 18 living with them, 61.4% were married couples living together, 10.6% had a female householder with no husband present, and 23.3% were non-families. 20.1% of all households were made up of individuals, and 9.5% had someone living alone who was 65 years of age or older. The average household size was 2.70 and the average family size was 3.09.

In the village, the population was spread out, with 29.0% under the age of 18, 10.2% from 18 to 24, 29.4% from 25 to 44, 17.3% from 45 to 64, and 14.1% who were 65 years of age or older. The median age was 32 years. For every 100 females there were 103.2 males. For every 100 females age 18 and over, there were 104.5 males.

The median income for a household in the village was $41,583, and the median income for a family was $45,179. Males had a median income of $31,458 versus $26,125 for females. The per capita income for the village was $19,538. About 6.8% of families and 9.4% of the population were below the poverty line, including 8.8% of those under age 18 and 12.5% of those age 65 or over.

== Economy ==
A Systemax factory located just east of Fletcher closed December 31, 2012.

Agriculture remains an integral part of life in Fletcher as the grain elevator, once owned by the Shepard Grain Company, is now owned by Urbana-based Champaign Landmark Inc..

An AT&T microwave radio relay tower (now abandoned) once provided several jobs for area residents. It remains standing (with the ear-shaped antennas now removed) a mile east of the village along U.S. Route 36. Ohio Bell operated the facility prior to the divestiture of the AT&T-owned Bell System in the 1980s. AT&T continued to operate the tower until the advent of fiber-optic cables and satellites which led to the replacement for the underground coaxial cable network and the use of the 318-foot steel structure now sitting vacant within the eastern Miami County farm fields.

== Notable people ==
- Thomas Charles Munger, judge
