= Ohio State Route 185 =

State highway in western Ohio, US

State Route 185

Route information
- Maintained by ODOT
- Length: 21.70 mi (34.92 km)
- Existed: 1940–present

Major junctions
- West end: US 127 near North Star
- East end: US 36 in Piqua

Location
- Country: United States
- State: Ohio
- Counties: Darke, Miami

Highway system
- Ohio State Highway System; Interstate; US; State; Scenic
← SR 184	→ SR 186

State Route 185 (SR 185) is a 21.70-mile (34.92 km) long east–west state highway in the western part of the U.S. state of Ohio. The western terminus of SR 185 is at U.S. Route 127 (US 127) approximately 3.75 miles (6.04 km) south of North Star. Its eastern terminus is in Piqua. Until 2011, this was at its junction with US 36 and SR 66 in the city's downtown business district, at the intersection of Ash Street and Spring Street. In 2011, SR 185 was re-routed to travel south along Sunset Drive in the western part of Piqua to a new eastern terminus where Sunset Drive meets US 36, which is known as Covington Avenue at that location.

== Route description ==
Along its way, SR 185 travels through eastern Darke County and northwestern Miami County. SR 185 travels through Versailles, Piqua, and the unincoporated communities: Brock, Frenchtown, and Webster. No portion of this state highway is included as a part of the National Highway System (NHS). The NHS is a network of routes deemed to be most important for the economy, mobility and defense of the nation.

== History ==
The history of Ohio State Route 185 dates back to the early 1900s, when the state of Ohio began to develop a complex system of highways to connect its major cities and towns. The original highway system was designed to promote economic growth and provide better access to goods and services for Ohio's residents.

In 1923, Ohio State Route 185 was officially established as part of this original highway system. At the time, the route ran from its current intersection with U.S. Route 127 (US 127) in Darke County to its intersection with Ohio State Route 118 in Mercer County.

Over the years, the route has undergone several changes and modifications to better serve the needs of local residents and businesses. In the 1930s, the highway was extended further east to its current endpoint at Ohio SR 49. In the 1950s, the highway was widened and resurfaced to accommodate increased traffic volume.

In the 1970s, concerns about safety on Ohio State Route 185 began to arise due to its intersections with other major roads. As a result, the Ohio Department of Transportation implemented several safety measures, including adding traffic signals and other safety features at key intersections.

SR 185 was applied in 1940. Replacing what had been designated SR 120, the highway ran from its intersection with Greenville–St. Marys Road (County Road 98, CR 98), at the time a part of US 127, to what was, until 2011, its eastern terminus in downtown Piqua at the intersection of US 36 and SR 66. By 1953, when US 127 was re-routed onto a more direct alignment in northern Darke County, SR 185 was extended a short distance west to its current western terminus at the then newly-realigned US 127.

On September 26, 2011, SR 185 was re-aligned from its former eastern terminus at the junction of US 36 and SR 66 in downtown Piqua. The new route travels south along Sunset Drive from the intersection of Park Avenue, and ends where Sunset Drive meets US 36 (Covington Avenue).

On October 15, 2013, SR 185 was rerouted in Versailles from its old route along Jackson Street and North West Street. The new route turns south onto the newly constructed Progress Way before joining SR 47 on Greenlawn Avenue. The route was changed to accommodate transportation to and from the Midmark facilities.

== Major intersections ==
County	Location	mi	km	Destinations	Notes
Darke	York Township	0.00	0.00	US 127	
Darke	Versailles	5.45	8.77	SR 47 west (North Greenlawn Avenue)	Western end of SR 47 concurrency
Darke	Versailles	5.71	9.19	SR 47 east (West Main Street) / SR 121 ends	Eastern end of SR 47 concurrency; northern terminus of SR 121 and western end of concurrency
Darke	Versailles	6.14	9.88	SR 121 south (Marker Road)	Eastern end of SR 121 concurrency
Darke–Miami county line	Adams–Newberry township line	11.78	18.96	SR 721 south (South Miami Avenue)	Northern terminus of SR 721
Miami	Newberry Township	15.82	25.46	SR 48	
Miami	Piqua	21.70	34.92	US 36 (Covington Avenue) / South Sunset Drive	Eastern terminus
1.000 mi = 1.609 km; 1.000 km = 0.621 mi: Concurrency terminus
