= Warrensburg, Ohio =

Unincorporated community in Ohio

Coordinates: 40.3058941°N 83.1685247°W

Map

Warrensburg, Ohio is an unincorporated community in Scioto Township, Delaware County, in the U.S. state of Ohio.

== History ==
In 1809–1810, Philip Horshaw built a grist mill along the Olentangy River, attracting Benjamin Powers and Joseph Dunlap to build a store nearby. The development was the first of its kind in Scioto Township, attracting enough settlers to form a town known as Millville. The town expanded quickly but would be hampered when the railroad was built through the nearby town of Ostrander, Ohio.

A post office opened on August 26, 1885, called Warrensburg, and closed a few years later due to the lack of mail.
