= Ohio State Route 54 =

State highway in Ohio, US

State Route 54

Route information
- Maintained by ODOT
- Length: 22.968 mi (36.963 km)
- Existed: 1938–present

Major junctions
- South end: SR 41 near South Charleston
- US 40 in South Vienna; I-70 in South Vienna
- North end: US 36 / SR 29 in Urbana

Location
- Country: United States
- State: Ohio
- Counties: Clark, Champaign

Highway system
- Ohio State Highway System; Interstate; US; State; Scenic
← SR 53	→ SR 55

State Route 54 (SR 54) is a north–south state highway that serves west-central Ohio. It extends from Urbana in the north, to southeast of Springfield.

== History ==
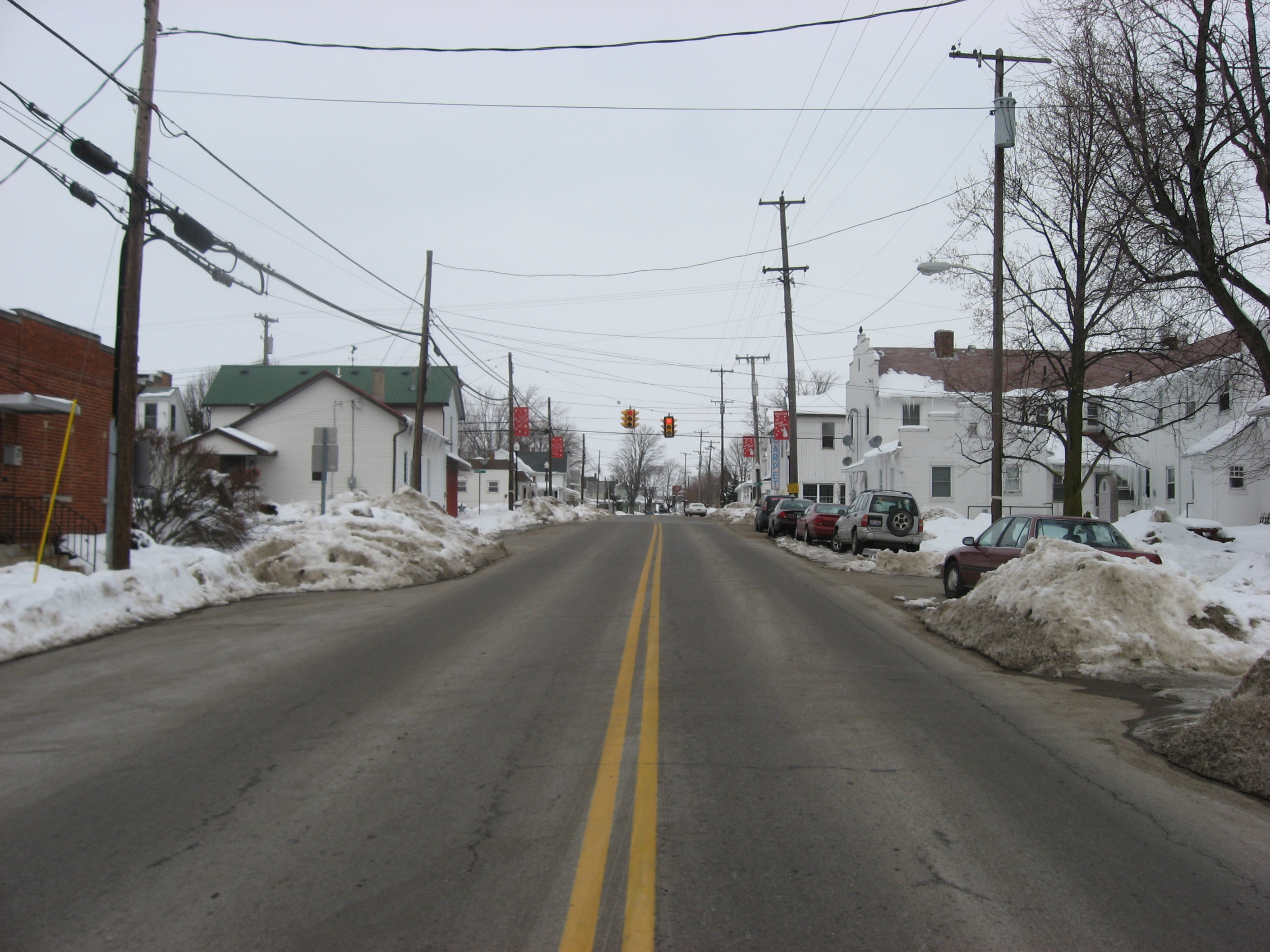
Looking north along SR 54 in South Vienna

SR 54 was commissioned in 1923 between its current southern terminus and Indiana state line northwest of Willshire. The highway was routed on to mostly the current alignments of SR 29 and U.S. Route 33 (US 33), and SR 54's current alignment. In 1938 the northern terminus was moved to the Indiana state line west of Celina. One year later SR 54 between Urbana and Indiana state line became SR 29, leaving SR 54 on most of its current alignment. SR 54 formerly traveled along a 0.79-mile-long (1.27 km) concurrency with US 36 and SR 29 into downtown Urbana where it ended at a traffic circle with US 68. By 2013, it was truncated to its current northern terminus just east of the downtown area.

== Major intersections ==
County	Location	mi	km	Destinations	Notes
Clark	Harmony Township	0.000	0.000	SR 41 – South Charleston	
Clark	South Vienna	5.254– 5.267	8.455– 8.476	US 40 (National Road) – Springfield, Columbus	
Clark	South Vienna	5.601– 5.791	9.014– 9.320	I-70 – Columbus, Indianapolis	Exit 66 (I-70)
Champaign	Union Township	13.447	21.641	SR 4 – Springfield, Mechanicsburg	
Champaign	Urbana	22.968	36.963	US 36 / SR 29 (Scioto Street) / North Jefferson Street	
1.000 mi = 1.609 km; 1.000 km = 0.621 mi
