= Ludlow Falls, Ohio =

- Village
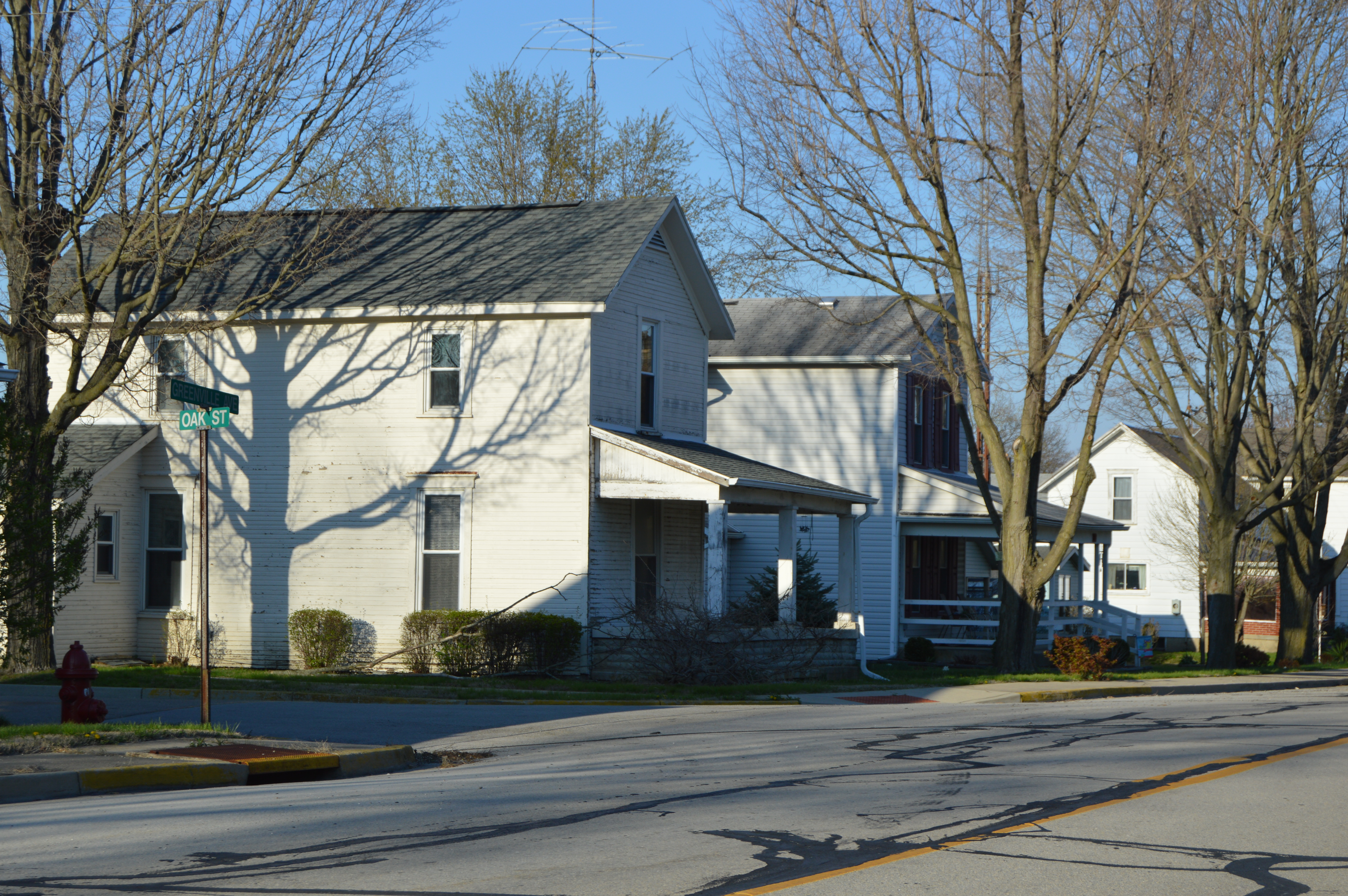
- Greenville Avenue

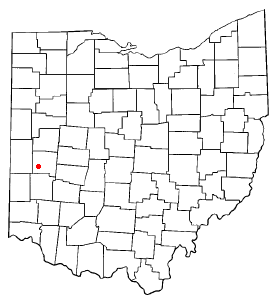
- Location of Ludlow Falls, Ohio

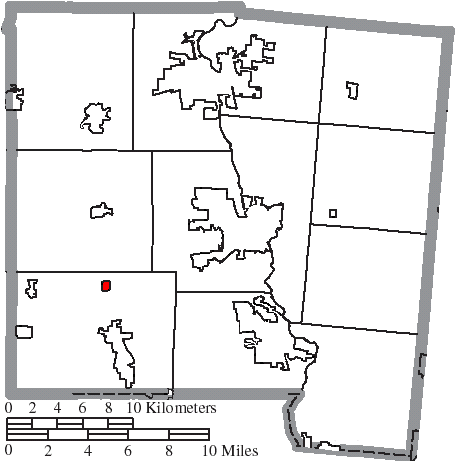
- Location of Ludlow Falls in Miami County
- Coordinates: 39°59′58″N 84°20′22″W
- Country: United States
- State: Ohio
- County: Miami
- Township: Union

Area
  - Total: 0.18 sq mi (0.46 km^{2})
  - Land: 0.18 sq mi (0.46 km^{2})
  - Water: 0 sq mi (0.00 km^{2})
- Elevation: 906 ft (276 m)

Population (2020)
  - Total: 175
  - Density: 980.3/sq mi (378.51/km^{2})
- Time zone: UTC-5 (Eastern (EST))
  - Summer (DST): UTC-4 (EDT)
- ZIP code: 45339
- Area codes: 937, 326
- FIPS code: 39-45374
- GNIS feature ID: 2399201

Ludlow Falls is a village in Miami County, Ohio, United States. The population was 175 at the 2020 census. It is part of the Dayton Metropolitan Statistical Area. Ludlow Falls is named after surveyor Israel Ludlow.

== Geography ==
According to the United States Census Bureau, the village has a total area of 0.18 square miles (0.47 km^{2}), all land.

Ludlow Falls is a part of the Milton-Union School district located in the neighboring West Milton.

Ludlow Creek, a tributary of the Stillwater River, flows through Ludlow Falls. The village's name is derived from the waterfall of the stream located in the village.

There was a railroad line through Ludlow Falls that was built in 1881 from Springfield, Ohio to Indianapolis, Indiana. It was later owned by the New York Central Railroad. There was very little on-line traffic and the line was lightly used by the 1970s. The line was not included in the 1976 makeup of Conrail and the last train ran on March 31, 1976. The tracks were pulled up shortly thereafter.

== Demographics ==
Historical population
Census	Pop.	Note	%±
1920	171		—
1930	202		18.1%
1940	212		5.0%
1950	277		30.7%
1960	273		−1.4%
1970	292		7.0%
1980	248		−15.1%
1990	300		21.0%
2000	210		−30.0%
2010	208		−1.0%
2020	175		−15.9%
U.S. Decennial Census

=== 2010 census ===
As of the census of 2010, there were 208 people, 81 households, and 55 families living in the village. The population density was 1,155.6 inhabitants per square mile (446.2/km^{2}). There were 86 housing units at an average density of 477.8 per square mile (184.5/km^{2}). The racial makeup of the village was 100.0% White. Hispanic or Latino of any race were 0.5% of the population.

There were 81 households, of which 34.6% had children under the age of 18 living with them, 40.7% were married couples living together, 17.3% had a female householder with no husband present, 9.9% had a male householder with no wife present, and 32.1% were non-families. 24.7% of all households were made up of individuals, and 3.7% had someone living alone who was 65 years of age or older. The average household size was 2.57 and the average family size was 3.04.

The median age in the village was 34 years. 28.8% of residents were under the age of 18; 7.8% were between the ages of 18 and 24; 22.7% were from 25 to 44; 33.6% were from 45 to 64; and 7.2% were 65 years of age or older. The gender makeup of the village was 52.4% male and 47.6% female.

=== 2000 census ===
As of the census of 2000, there were 210 people, 81 households, and 60 families living in the village. The population density was 1,144.4 inhabitants per square mile (441.9/km^{2}). There were 88 housing units at an average density of 479.6 per square mile (185.2/km^{2}). The racial makeup of the village was 98.10% White, and 1.90% from two or more races. Hispanic or Latino of any race were 0.48% of the population.

There were 81 households, out of which 37.0% had children under the age of 18 living with them, 49.4% were married couples living together, 14.8% had a female householder with no husband present, and 25.9% were non-families. 22.2% of all households were made up of individuals, and 6.2% had someone living alone who was 65 years of age or older. The average household size was 2.59 and the average family size was 2.97.

In the village, the population was spread out, with 29.0% under the age of 18, 7.6% from 18 to 24, 33.8% from 25 to 44, 21.9% from 45 to 64, and 7.6% who were 65 years of age or older. The median age was 35 years. For every 100 females there were 114.3 males. For every 100 females age 18 and over, there were 109.9 males.

The median income for a household in the village was $39,375, and the median income for a family was $43,500. Males had a median income of $32,250 versus $21,071 for females. The per capita income for the village was $16,383. About 6.9% of families and 6.9% of the population were below the poverty line, including 9.6% of those under the age of eighteen and none of those 65 or over.

== Education ==
The school district is Milton-Union Exempted Village School District. The comprehensive high school of that district is Milton-Union High School.
