= Milton-Union High School =

Coordinates: 39°57′48″N 84°20′45″W

Location
- 7640 Milton-Potsdam Rd. West Milton, Ohio 45383; United States

Information
- Type: Public
- Established: 1936
- Principal: Sam Watson
- Teaching staff: 25.02 (FTE)
- Grades: 9-12
- Enrollment: 362 (2023-2024)
- Student to teacher ratio: 14.47
- Color
- Nickname: Bulldogs
- Yearbook: Echo
- Conference: Three Rivers Conference
- Website: www.muschools.com/o/high-school

Milton-Union High School is a public high school in West Milton, Ohio, United States. Its name is derived from the town in which it lies (West Milton), and the township which it serves (Union Township). It is the only high school in the Milton-Union Exempted Village Schools district. The school's mascot is a bulldog.

The school met all twelve indicators on the 2009-2010 Ohio Department of Education report card, earning an "Excellent" rating. On their latest scorecard, Milton-Union scored a 73.02 (2022). They rank #193 in Ohio High Schools and #15 in Dayton, Ohio Metro Area High Schools.

Municipalities covered by the district include Laura, Ludlow Falls, Potsdam, and West Milton. It also includes the Miami County portion of Union.

== History ==
The Milton-Union Exempted Village School District was formed in 1936 when the Milton Village District and Union Township District merged. The former building was erected in 1938 and has been renovated and added to many times during its existence.

In 2008, voters approved a measure to build a new K-12 building. The old high school, elementary and junior high were demolished in 2013. The new building has been built and is currently in use.

The district is one of the few in the Dayton area to be served by only one each of elementary, junior high, and high school.

== Athletics ==
Milton-Union competes in the newly formed (as of 2021) Three Rivers Conference (TRC). Previously the Bulldogs were a member of the SWBL and SRC leagues. Milton-Union has been a member of three leagues in its history: the Southwestern Buckeye League (originally named the Little Western Buckeye League) from 1940 to 1981, and the Southwestern Rivers Conference from 1982 to 2000. Milton-Union rejoined the Southwestern Buckeye League in 2001 until 2021 and then the newly formed Three Rivers Conference in 2021. West Milton High School (the predecessor of Milton-Union) never competed in a league. Milton-Union schools spent 61-years in the Southwestern Buckeye League, 20-years in the Southwestern Rivers Conference.

== State championships ==
- Boys' basketball - 1910 (as West Milton High School)

== Notable alumni ==
- Carl Brumbaugh, quarterback for Ohio State University, University of Florida, Chicago Bears
- Charlie Green, quarterback at Wittenberg University, Ohio and the Oakland Raiders; inductee into the College Football Hall of Fame
- Mike Kelly, former University of Dayton football coach, inductee into the College Football Hall of Fame
- Bob Schul, won 1964 Olympic gold medal (Tokyo, Japan), 5000M run
- Wes Martin, professional football guard for the Washington Redskins and the New York Giants
