= Union Township, Miami County, Ohio =

Township in Ohio, US

- Township
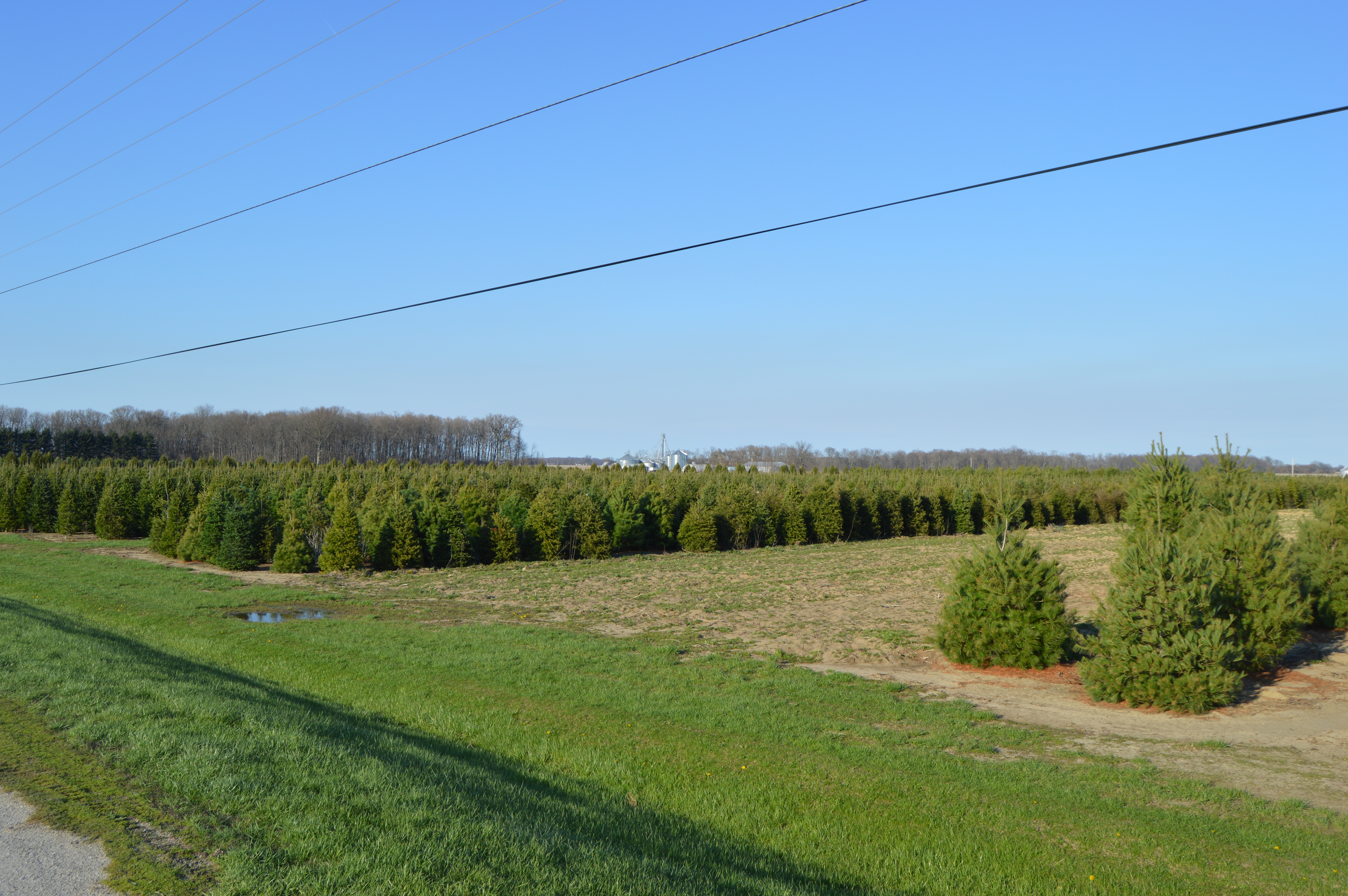
- Christmas tree farm south of Potsdam

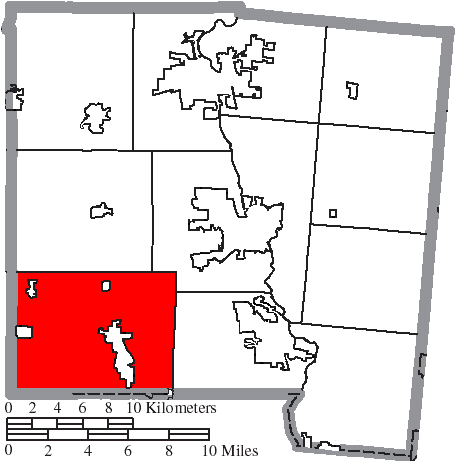
- Location of Union Township in Miami County
- Coordinates: 39°58′7″N 84°20′51″W
- Country: United States
- State: Ohio
- County: Miami

Area
  - Total: 48.8 sq mi (126.3 km^{2})
  - Land: 48.5 sq mi (125.6 km^{2})
  - Water: 0.27 sq mi (0.7 km^{2})
- Elevation: 922 ft (281 m)

Population (2020)
  - Total: 9,569
  - Density: 197.3/sq mi (76.19/km^{2})
- Time zone: UTC-5 (Eastern (EST))
  - Summer (DST): UTC-4 (EDT)
- FIPS code: 39-78456
- GNIS feature ID: 1086644
- Website: https://uniontwpmiamico.com/

Union Township is one of the twelve townships of Miami County, Ohio, United States. The 2020 census found 9,569 people in the township.

== Geography ==
Located in the southwestern corner of the county, it borders the following townships:

- Newton Township - north
- Concord Township - northeast
- Monroe Township - east
- Clayton - southeast
- Clay Township, Montgomery County - southwest
- Monroe Township, Darke County - west
- Franklin Township, Darke County - northwest corner

Several populated places are located in Union Township:

- Laura, a village in the northwest
- Ludlow Falls, a village in the north
- Potsdam, a village in the west
- Part of Union, a city in the southeast
- West Milton, a village in the center

== Name and history ==
It is one of twenty-seven Union Townships statewide.

== Government ==
The township is governed by a three-member board of trustees, who are elected in November of odd-numbered years to a four-year term beginning on the following January 1. Two are elected in the year after the presidential election and one is elected in the year before it. There is also an elected township fiscal officer, who serves a four-year term beginning on April 1 of the year after the election, which is held in November of the year before the presidential election. Vacancies in the fiscal officership or on the board of trustees are filled by the remaining trustees.

== Education ==
Milton-Union High School serves the township (which has a unified school district).
