= Laura, Ohio =

- Village
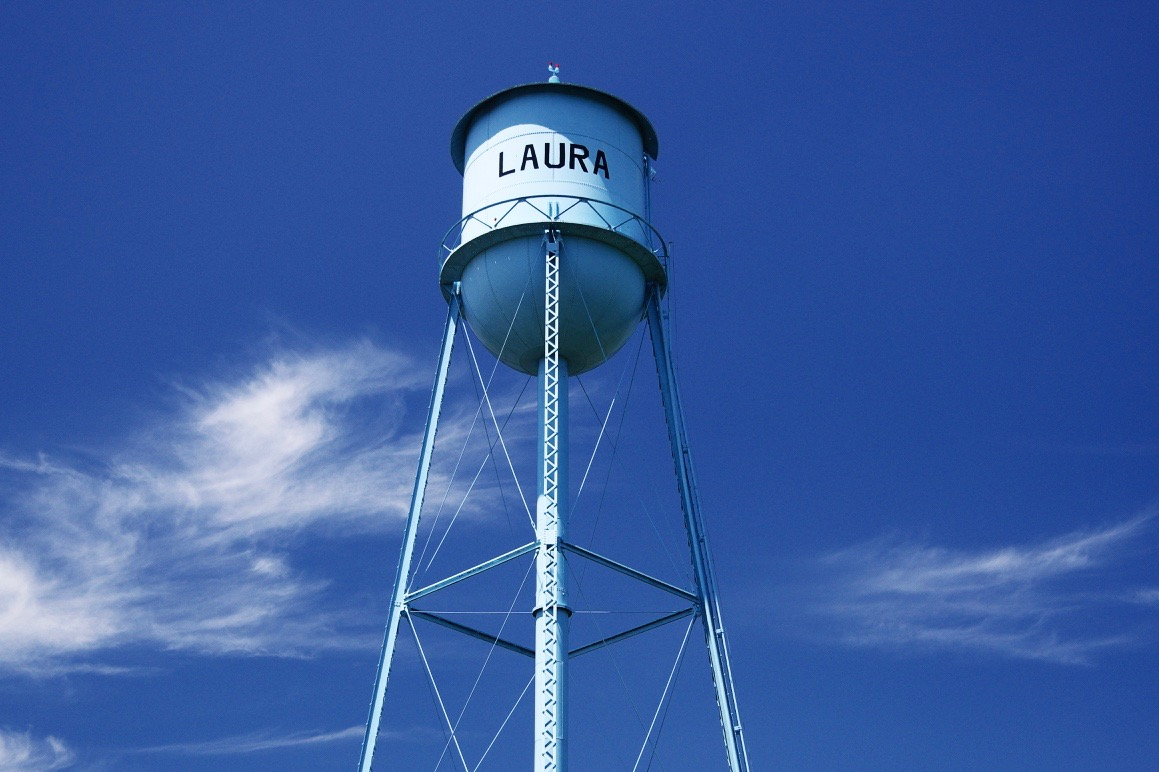
- Water tower in Laura

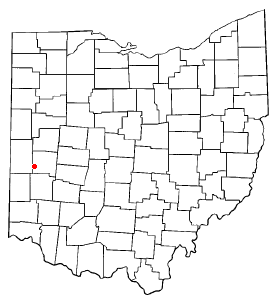
- Location of Laura, Ohio

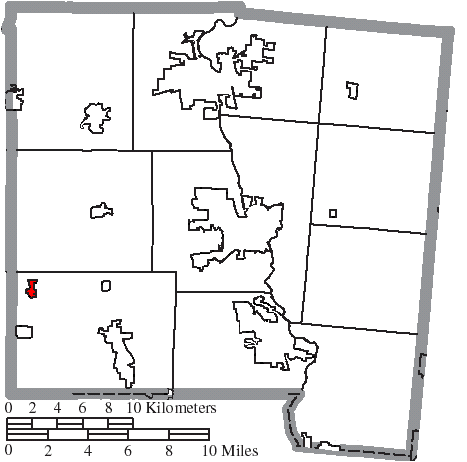
- Location of Laura in Miami County
- Coordinates: 39°59′50″N 84°24′29″W
- Country: United States
- State: Ohio
- County: Miami
- Township: Union

Government
  - Mayor: Glen McSparran

Area
  - Total: 0.27 sq mi (0.69 km^{2})
  - Land: 0.27 sq mi (0.69 km^{2})
  - Water: 0 sq mi (0.00 km^{2})
- Elevation: 994 ft (303 m)

Population (2020)
  - Total: 398
  - Density: 1,487.1/sq mi (574.17/km^{2})
- Time zone: UTC-5 (Eastern (EST))
  - Summer (DST): UTC-4 (EDT)
- ZIP code: 45337
- Area codes: 937, 326
- FIPS code: 39-42028
- GNIS feature ID: 2398398
- Website: https://www.lauraohio.com/

Laura is a village in Miami County, Ohio, United States. The population was 398 at the 2020 census. It is part of the Dayton Metropolitan Statistical Area.

== History ==
Laura was laid out around 1840. A post office called Laura has been in operation since 1850. The village was named after Laura, the first postmaster's daughter. Laura was incorporated as a village in 1892.

== Geography ==
According to the United States Census Bureau, the village has a total area of 0.27 square miles (0.70 km^{2}), all land.

== Demographics ==
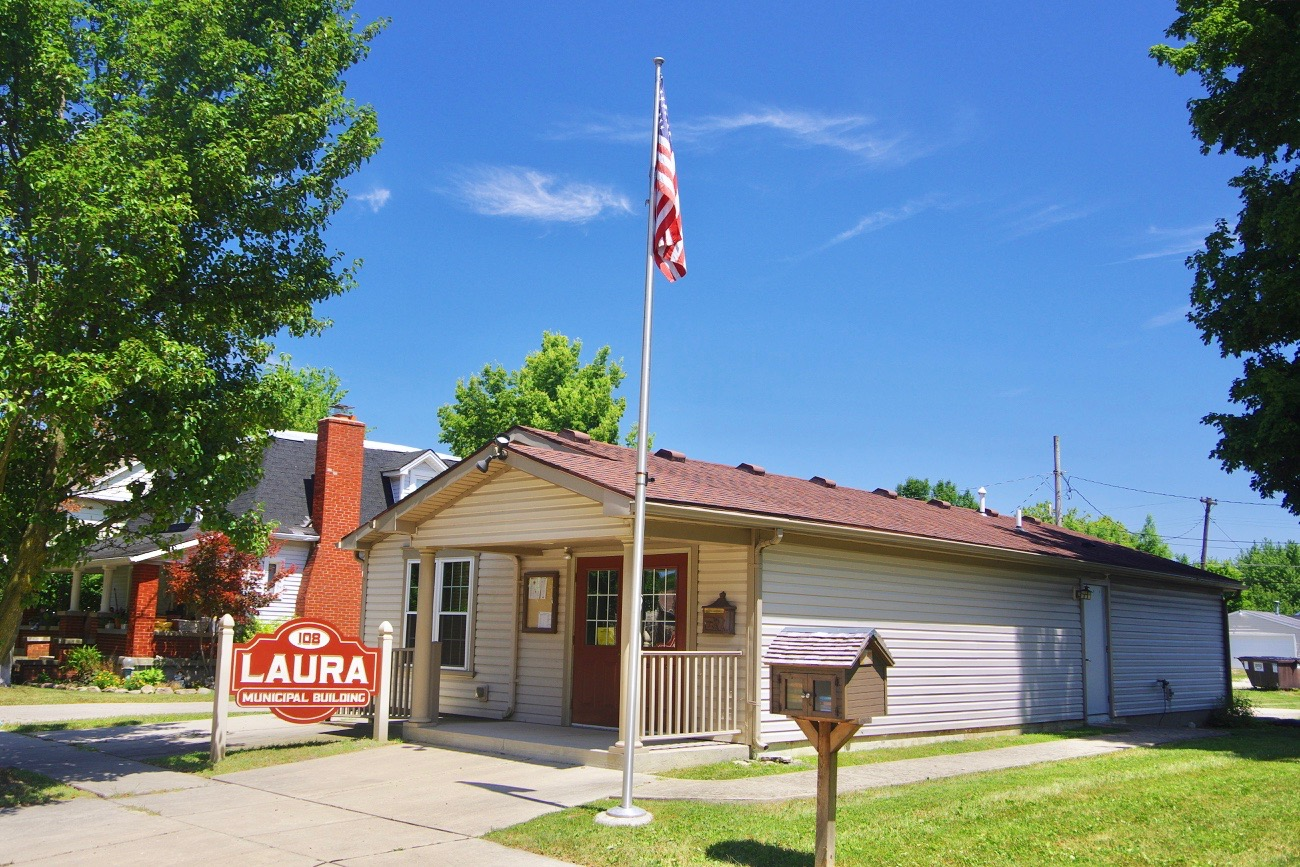
Laura Municipal Building

Historical population
Census	Pop.	Note	%±
1900	378		—
1910	302		−20.1%
1920	243		−19.5%
1930	271		11.5%
1940	317		17.0%
1950	380		19.9%
1960	526		38.4%
1970	464		−11.8%
1980	501		8.0%
1990	483		−3.6%
2000	487		0.8%
2010	474		−2.7%
2020	398		−16.0%
U.S. Decennial Census

=== 2010 census ===
As of the census of 2010, there were 474 people, 174 households, and 120 families living in the village. The population density was 1,755.6 inhabitants per square mile (677.8/km^{2}). There were 185 housing units at an average density of 685.2 per square mile (264.6/km^{2}). The racial makeup of the village was 96.6% White, 1.7% African American, 0.4% Native American, 0.2% Asian, 0.6% from other races, and 0.4% from two or more races. Hispanic or Latino of any race were 1.5% of the population.

There were 174 households, of which 30.5% had children under the age of 18 living with them, 54.6% were married couples living together, 8.6% had a female householder with no husband present, 5.7% had a male householder with no wife present, and 31.0% were non-families. 19.0% of all households were made up of individuals, and 8% had someone living alone who was 65 years of age or older. The average household size was 2.72 and the average family size was 3.19.

The median age in the village was 38 years. 23.4% of residents were under the age of 18; 10.8% were between the ages of 18 and 24; 24% were from 25 to 44; 28.9% were from 45 to 64; and 12.9% were 65 years of age or older. The gender makeup of the village was 49.8% male and 50.2% female.

=== 2000 census ===
As of the census of 2000, there were 487 people, 175 households, and 131 families living in the village. The population density was 1,714.6 inhabitants per square mile (662.0/km^{2}). There were 182 housing units at an average density of 640.8 per square mile (247.4/km^{2}). The racial makeup of the village was 97.54% White, 0.21% Native American, 0.21% Asian, 0.41% from other races, and 1.64% from two or more races. Hispanic or Latino of any race were 2.26% of the population.

There were 175 households, out of which 41.1% had children under the age of 18 living with them, 60.0% were married couples living together, 8.6% had a female householder with no husband present, and 25.1% were non-families. 17.1% of all households were made up of individuals, and 6.9% had someone living alone who was 65 years of age or older. The average household size was 2.78 and the average family size was 3.18.

In the village, the population was spread out, with 29.2% under the age of 18, 7.8% from 18 to 24, 29.8% from 25 to 44, 24.2% from 45 to 64, and 9.0% who were 65 years of age or older. The median age was 35 years. For every 100 females there were 110.8 males. For every 100 females age 18 and over, there were 101.8 males.

The median income for a household in the village was $45,833, and the median income for a family was $46,250. Males had a median income of $33,542 versus $23,906 for females. The per capita income for the village was $17,912. About 2.7% of families and 2.8% of the population were below the poverty line, including 3.0% of those under age 18 and none of those age 65 or over.

== Education ==
The school district is Milton-Union Exempted Village School District. The comprehensive high school of that district is Milton-Union High School.
