= Lost Creek =

Lost Creek can refer to several places:

- Lost Creek (Feather River, South Fork), a California tributary of the South Fork Feather River with confluence at 39.563816°N 121.190186°W
- Lost Creek (Kansas), a stream in Bourbon and Linn counties
- Lost Creek (Kentucky), a stream in Perry and Breathitt counties
- Lost Creek (Cedar Creek), a stream in Missouri
- Lost Creek (Courtois Creek), a stream in Missouri
- Lost Creek (Cuivre River), a stream in Missouri
- Lost Creek (Grand River), a stream in Missouri
- Lost Creek (Grindstone Creek tributary), a stream in Missouri
- Lost Creek (Meramec River), a stream in Missouri
- Lost Creek (St. Francis River), a stream in Missouri
- Lost Creek (Great Miami River), a stream in Ohio
- Lost Creek (South Fork Little Butte Creek), a stream in the Rogue River basin in Oregon
- Lost Creek (Middle Fork Willamette River), in Oregon
- Lost Creek (Oregon), a tributary of the McKenzie River
- Lost Creek (Pennsylvania), a tributary of the Juniata River
- Lost Creek (Pit River), a California tributary of the Pit River (via Hat Creek) which contains the Lost Creek Falls (40.760131°N 121.407337°W)
- Lost Creek (South Platte River), a Colorado perennial tributary of the South Platte River (via Goose Creek)
- Lost Creek Wilderness, a central Colorado wilderness area
- Lost Creek, Texas, a census-designated place in Travis County
- Lost Creek, West Virginia, a town in Harrison County
- Lost Creek (British Columbia), a stream in British Columbia
- Lost Creek Township (disambiguation)

Other

- Lost Creek (film), a 2016 American horror drama film

== See also ==
- Loss Creek (disambiguation)
