= Lisabeth =

Lisabeth or Lizabeth is a given name and a surname. Notable people with the name include:

Given name

- Lisabeth Hughes Abramson (born 1955), American justice of the Kentucky Supreme Court
- Lisabeth H. Muhrer, Norwegian handball player
- Lizabeth Cohen (21st century), American historian
- Lizabeth Scott (1922-2015), American actress
- Lizabeth A. Turner (1829-1907), National President, Woman's Relief Corps

Surname

- Johan Lisabeth (born 1971), Belgian athlete who specialised in high hurdles

== See also ==
- Elizabeth (disambiguation)
