= Lycurgus J. Rusk =

American politician

Lycurgus James Rusk (March 13, 1851 – November 5, 1928) was a member of the Wisconsin State Assembly.

== Biography ==
Rusk was born on March 13, 1851, in Morgan County, Ohio. The following year, he moved with his parents to Viroqua, Wisconsin. His father, Jeremiah McLain Rusk, became a noted officer in the Union Army during the American Civil War, a member of the United States House of Representatives, Governor of Wisconsin and United States Secretary of Agriculture. Lycurgus' older sister, Charity Rusk Craig, served as the national president of the Woman's Relief Corps.

The younger Rusk graduated from what is now the University of Wisconsin-Madison in 1870 and later attended Harvard Law School and began practicing law. Additionally, he served in the Wisconsin National Guard, reaching the rank of colonel.

In 1877, Rusk married Ada M. Robson. They had three daughters. In 1885, Rusk moved to Chippewa Falls, Wisconsin. Rusk died on November 5, 1928, at St. Joseph's Hospital, in Chippewa Falls, Wisconsin, after a short illness.

== Political career ==
Rusk was a member of the Assembly during the 1899 session. He was a Republican.
