= Sarah E. Fuller =

American philanthropist, social leader (1838–1913)

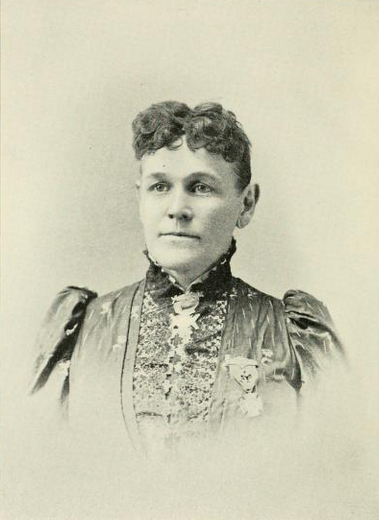
- Born: Sarah Elizabeth Mills; August 1, 1838; Portland, Maine, U.S.
- Died: December 15, 1913 (aged 75); Medford, Massachusetts, U.S.
- Occupations: philanthropist; social leader
- Known for: National President, Woman's Relief Corps
- Spouse: George W. Fuller (m. 1855; died 1864)

Sarah E. Fuller (1838–1913) was an American philanthropist and social leader. For many years, she was affiliated with the Woman's Relief Corps (WRC). She served as the first President of its Massachusetts Department (1879–1882), and third President of the National organization (1885, 1886). Fuller had a record of 40 years' service for the soldiers of the Union Army, having enrolled herself as a worker in the United States Christian Commission during the early days of the Civil War.

She was an honorary member of the Union of Prisoners of War Association, a life member of the national executive board WRC, chaplain of the Union of King's Daughters of Medford, Massachusetts a director of the Home for the Aged at Medford, chaplain of the Sarah Bradlee Fulton Chapter, Daughters of the American Revolution (DAR), of that city, and was interested in the Daughters of Veterans, Tent 22, in Medford, which was named in her honor. She was also a member of the New England Woman's Press Association. She was also interested in the cause of temperance and was a member of the East Boston Bethel of the International Organisation of Good Templars.

== Early life and education ==
Sarah Elizabeth Mills was born August 1, 1838, in Portland, Maine. She was descended on the paternal side from a titled English family, whose ancestry she was able to trace back for over 300 years, and on the maternal side is of Scottish extraction. Her father, Samuel Mills (1804–1888), married Betsey Haines (1811–1886). Two great-uncles served as Secretary of State of Maine . Her ancestors on both sides fought in the American Revolutionary War, also in the War of 1812. Of ten children, Sarah is the only one who survived.

Her father, Samuel Mills, who was an intense abolitionist and a public-spirited citizen, taught his daughter to take an interest in the leading topics of the day. When only a schoolgirl, she attended with him meetings which were addressed by Daniel Webster, Rufus Choate, Charles Sumner, Wendell Phillips, and other great orators of that period. These early lessons had a marked effect upon her character.

Her education was begun in the public schools of Portland, but, her parents removing to East Boston in 1849, her school studies were completed in that city.

== Career ==
In 1855, she married George W. Fuller, of Canton, Maine.

=== Civil War ===
In 1861, Mr. Fuller responded to the call for volunteers, but was rejected as physically unable to bear the hardships of war. In 1862, he volunteered in the naval service, on the gunboat Roanoke, but it was determined that he was unfit because of his frail constitution. On February 12, 1864, he enrolled his name for the third time, and was mustered into the service six days later as a member of Company C, 4th Massachusetts Cavalry Regiment. The regiment remained in camp at Readville, Boston until April 24, when it sailed from Boston for Newport News, Virginia, on the steamer Western Metropolis. At Petersburg, Virginia in the following June, Mr. Fuller was stricken with malarial typhoid fever, and was removed to the hospital at Portsmouth, Virginia. He died July 2, 1864, and is buried in the Hampton National Cemetery at Hampton, Virginia. In 1868, Fuller visited the Hampton National Cemetery where her husband was buried.

During this period, Mrs. Fuller assisted in preparing hospital stores and other comforts for the soldiers. She also participated in many patriotic concerts given in Maine and Massachusetts for the hospital fund. The day after the news of the battle of Antietam was received at the northern states, she arranged, with the help of a few others, a concert for which US$400 were realized. This money was converted into articles which were forwarded to the front in less than two days after the concert was given.

Remembering with gratitude that an army nurse ministered to her husband in the hospital, Fuller devoted her life to the soldiers' cause. She represented Ward One of Boston on the executive committee of the U.S. Christian Commission.

=== Massachusetts Department of the WRC. ===
When the Grand Army of the Republic (G.A.R.) was formed in 1866, its objectives enlisted her sympathies. In 1871, she assisted in forming a Ladies' Aid Society, auxiliary to Joseph Hooker Post, No. 23, of East Boston. She served as secretary, vice-president, and president, also as a delegate to the State convention of Ladies' Auxiliary Societies, held at Fitchburg, Massachusetts, 1879. At this convention, the Woman's State Relief Corps of Massachusetts was formed. Fuller was chosen president, and was the first signer to its constitution. She was re-elected to this office in 1880 and in 1881. The position required time and money.

The platform of the new order, welcoming to membership all loyal women who were willing to work for the veterans, was a broad one. The impressive ritualistic service and thorough methods of organizing indicated that the order had been formed upon a permanent basis. To win the approval of the G.A.R. was the next step taken, for local corps could only be instituted by request of posts. General Horace Binney Sargent, Department Commander when the WRC was formed, his successor, Captain John G. B. Adams, and Captain James F. Meech, Assistant Adjutant-general, gave support to Fuller and her associates. The use of G.A.R. headquarters in Boston was tendered to them for weekly meetings. Here they consulted with post commanders, explained the objects of WRC work to numerous inquirers, and outlined plans.

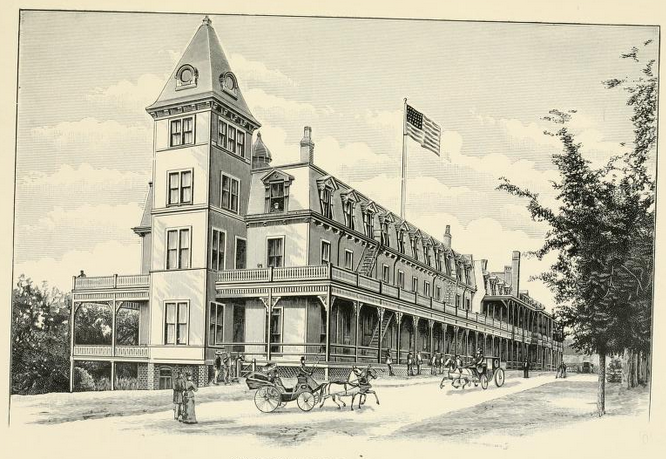
Soldiers' Home (Chelsea, Massachusetts; 1895)

In 1881, a committee was chosen by the women of the WRC to cooperate with the trustees of the Soldiers' Home, Chelsea, Massachusetts in their plans for the bazaar. Fuller was chairman, and by her personal appeals, official correspondence, and public addresses created great interest in the project, as shown by the fact that the WRC tables netted US$4,189.25. Fuller was the first woman to give a public address in behalf of the Home, accepting an invitation extended by General Sargent to speak in Haverhill, Massachusetts.

Fuller served in official positions in the Ladies' Aid Association of the Soldiers' Home ever since its formation in 1882, including vice-president. A room in the Home was dedicated in her honor by the Department WRC

Upon retiring from the presidency at the annual convention in 1882, Fuller was chosen secretary of the Department of Massachusetts. In her capacity as president and secretary, she traveled thousands of miles, instituted 19 corps in Massachusetts, five in Maine, and assisted Mrs. E. Florence Barker and M. Susie Goodale, associate officers, at the establishment of 18 others.

Fuller conducted a large correspondence, writing 1,500 letters and 500 post cards, arousing an interest in the order outside of Massachusetts. She believed in a national organization, and penned the first letter in its behalf. She secured the interest of prominent people in New Hampshire, and it was announced in general orders of Department Commander George Bowers, of that State, that a convention would be held at Laconia, New Hampshire, October 21, 1880. Fuller and Barker were invited to organize a State Department. The success of the work having been assured in Massachusetts and New Hampshire, a correspondence was conducted with the G.A.R. officials in Connecticut. As the result, in November 1882, Fuller, in company with Barker (her successor as Department President), organized several corps in that State. The Union Board, comprising the Departments of Massachusetts, New Hampshire, and Connecticut, was formed with headquarters in Boston.

=== National WRC ===
Fuller, who realized from the first the necessity for a national order, was one of the three delegates chosen to represent the Department of Massachusetts at the G.A.R. convention in Denver, Colorado, in 1883. This convention, called by Commander-in-chief Paul Van Der Voort, resulted in the establishment of the National WRC. Fuller was a prominent participant in the convention, and was unanimously chosen National Secretary. A busy year ensued. Over 2,000 communications were written and many hundred of pages of instruction prepared by her, numerous other duties also receiving attention. From September 5, 1883, to February 23, 1884, she issued supplies for 89 Corps.

At the second National Convention, held at Minneapolis, July, 1884, she was elected Senior Vice-president. During that year, she instituted three corps in Rhode Island and visited Vermont on a tour of inspection, organizing a department in that State. At the third National Convention, held in Portland, Maine, in June 1885, she was elected National President, and, upon returning home, tendered her resignation as department secretary of Massachusetts. Meanwhile, she had organized Corps No. 3 in East Boston, auxiliary to John A. Hawes Post, No. 159, and for nearly two years, served as its president. In view of her retirement from the presidency of Corps No. 3, in order to enter upon her duties as the official head of the National WRC, the post on July 24, 1885, adopted a series of resolutions expressing their warm appreciation of her loyalty and devotion.

During her year as National President, Fuller visited the Departments of New Hampshire, New York, Pennsylvania, Ohio, and Illinois. She carried on a large correspondence and addressed many public gatherings. She issued a series of eight general orders, one of which, a memorial tribute to General General Ulysses S. Grant , was widely read, and considered a document of historic interest.

At the fourth annual convention in San Francisco in July 1886, Fuller was elected a member of the National Executive Board, and at St. Louis, a year later, was unanimously chosen a life member of the board. In 1889, she was elected secretary of the Committee of Arrangements for the Eighth National Convention, to be held in Boston in 1890. As secretary of the National Pension Committee for Army Nurses, she was called to Washington, D.C. in June 1889. She conferred with committees and Congressmen, rendering assistance in support of favorable legislation for the pending bill. She was prostrated by the intense heat during that summer in Washington, D.C. A severe illness followed, resulting in serious deafness, and she was obliged to defer active work for two years.

She was elected Department Treasurer in February 1892, and was unanimously re-elected at every subsequent State convention. The organization was indebted to her for the written work which was the foundation of its ritualistic system. She was a recognized authority on historical matters. She delivered Memorial Day addresses in Maine, New Hampshire, and Massachusetts, and addressed hundreds of campfires and other patriotic gatherings.

She was a member of the executive committee of Arrangements for the National Convention in Boston (August, 1904), chair of the Entertainment Committee, and a worker on several subcommittees. As National Counselor, she performed active duties during the year, and had a prominent part in all the receptions and other gatherings connected with the Order during encampment week.

=== Other organizations ===
Her activities were not confined to one branch of work. She was broad-minded, and her executive ability was quickly recognized in any organization in which she became interested. In the Sunday-school connected with the Meridian Street Methodist Episcopal Church , of East Boston, of which she was a member, she was for many years the teacher of a large class of young women.

In temperance work, she was always active, filling prominent offices in the International Organisation of Good Templars, and was a Past Grand Commander of the United Order of the Golden Cross, another temperance organization. For three years, she served as chaplain of the Sarah Bradlee Fulton Chapter, DAR, of Medford. She was also an earnest worker in the International Order of the King's Daughters and Sons, holding for six years the office of leader of the Inasmuch Union of Medford.

== Personal life ==
She made her home with her son, George Samuel Taylor Fuller, of Medford.

For 17 years, Fuller was a member of the Handel and Haydn Society of Boston. She was also a member of the Daughters of the American Revolution.

== Death and legacy ==
Her portrait was hung in the Soldiers' Home; the Grand Army Hall, William Logan Rodman Post, No. 1, of New Bedford, Massachusetts; and the department headquarters in Boston.

Sarah E. Fuller died at her son's home in Medford, December 15, 1913.

== Selected works ==
- The Woman's Relief Corps, 1890
