= Lostcreek Township, Miami County, Ohio =

Township in Ohio, US

- Township
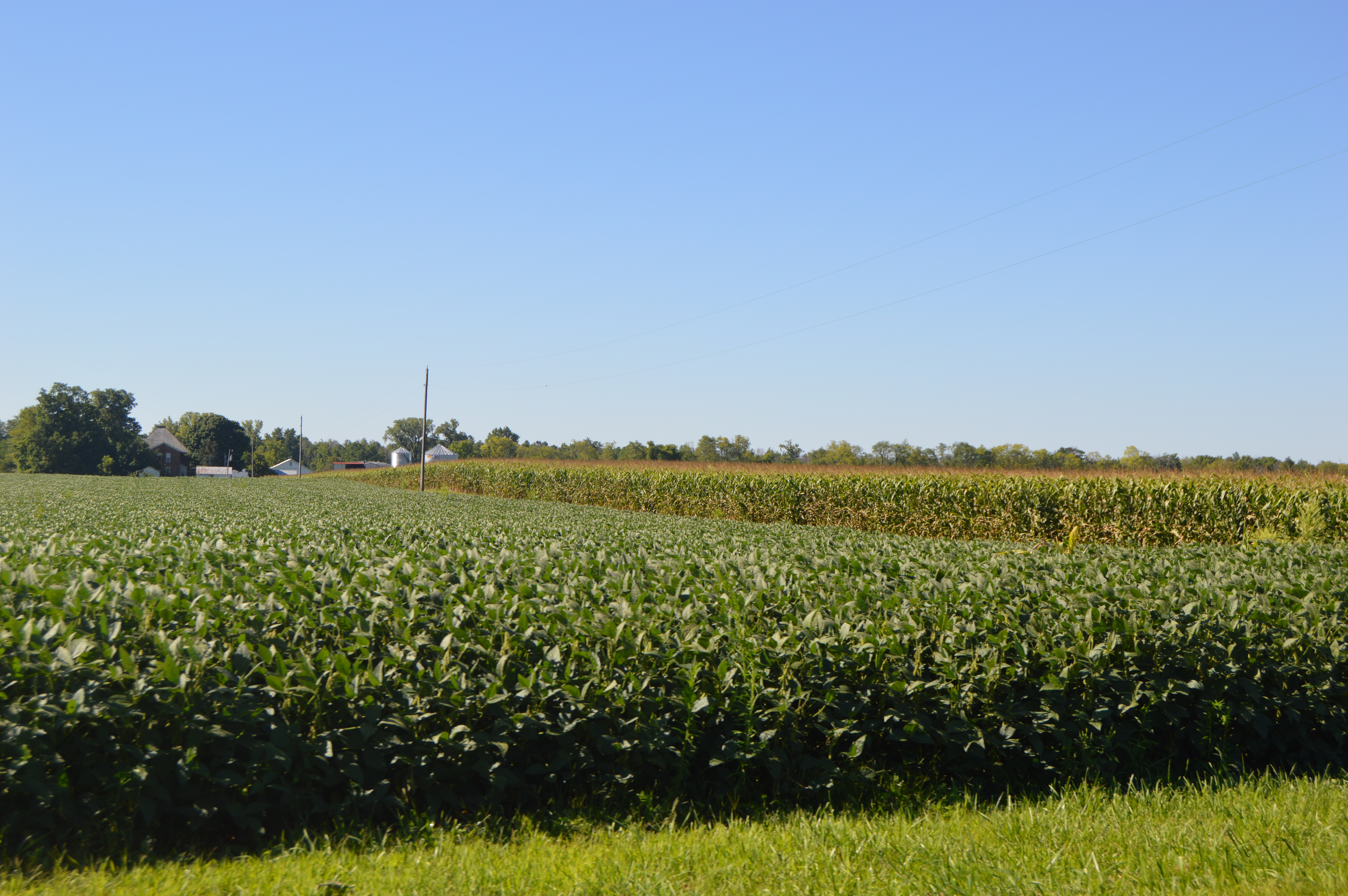
- Fields north of Casstown

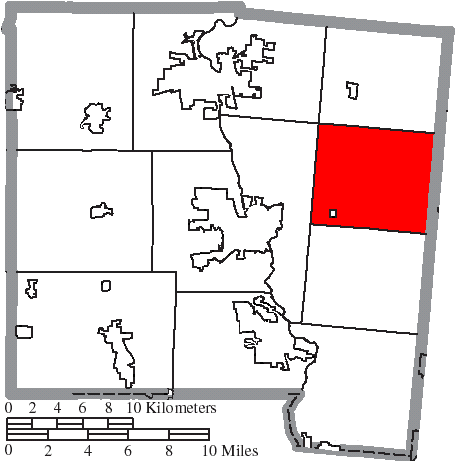
- Location of Lostcreek Township in Miami County
- Coordinates: 40°3′N 84°8′W
- Country: United States
- State: Ohio
- County: Miami

Population (2020)
  - Total: 1,606
- Time zone: UTC-5 (Eastern (EST))
  - Summer (DST): UTC-4 (EDT)

Lostcreek Township is one of the twelve townships of Miami County, Ohio, United States. The 2020 census found 1,606 people in the township.

== Geography ==
Located in the eastern part of the county, it borders the following townships:

- Brown Township - north
- Jackson Township, Champaign County - east
- Pike Township, Clark County - southeast corner
- Elizabeth Township - south
- Staunton Township - west
- Springcreek Township - northwest corner

The village of Casstown is located in southwestern Lostcreek Township.

== Name and history ==
Lostcreek Township was established in 1818, and named after Lost Creek, a tributary of the Great Miami River. It is the only Lostcreek Township statewide.

== Government ==
The township is governed by a three-member board of trustees, who are elected in November of odd-numbered years to a four-year term beginning on the following January 1. Two are elected in the year after the presidential election and one is elected in the year before it. There is also an elected township fiscal officer, who serves a four-year term beginning on April 1 of the year after the election, which is held in November of the year before the presidential election. Vacancies in the fiscal officership or on the board of trustees are filled by the remaining trustees.

== Notable people ==
- Sarah D. Winans (1841–1915), national president, Woman's Relief Corps
