= Sarah D. Winans =

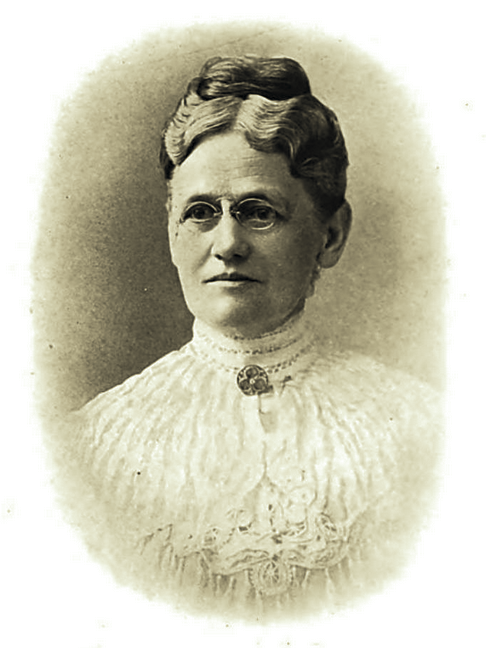
- Born: Sarah Darst; May 14, 1841; Lostcreek Township, Miami County, Ohio, U.S.
- Died: June 4, 1915 (aged 74); Toledo, Ohio, U.S.
- Known for: 21st National President, Woman's Relief Corps
- Spouse: John Cory Winans (m. 1866)

Signature
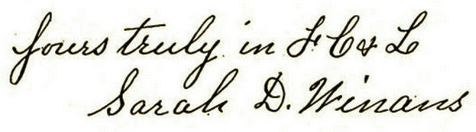

Sarah D. Winans (née Darst; 1841–1915) was an American charitable organization leader who served as the 21st National President of the Woman's Relief Corps (WRC). For 50 years, she served in the cause of patriotism and relief of Civil War soldiers, widows, and orphans.

== Early life and education ==
Sarah Darst was born at Lostcreek Township, Miami County, Ohio, on May 14, 1841. Her father was Rev. John Darst (1790–1875), a German Dunkard. Her mother was Mary (née Strausberger) Darst (1812–1904). Sarah had four older siblings: Anna, Catherine, Benjamin, and Rebecca.

Winans attended Lindon Hall Academy and the Girls' Seminary, Indianapolis, Indiana.

== Career ==
From the beginning of the Civil War until its close, she was assiduous in promoting the work of the U.S. Sanitary Commission, and in looking after the comfort of the soldier in the hospital, on the field, and in the camp. Winans organized an Aid Society under the U.S. Christian Commission, the first of its kind in Ohio. This organization was known as the Woman's Central Association for Relief, which was also referred to as Woman's Aid. The principles of this society were about the same as the American Red Cross of later years.

On September 25, 1866, she married John Cory Winans (1840–1915), a soldier of the 44th Ohio Volunteer Infantry and 8th Ohio Volunteer Cavalry, who carried his arm in steel splints all during his life.

When the WRC was organized, she found that her work was only begun, and that the field had widened. She joined A. H. Colman Corps at Troy and in 1886, was made president and served two terms. She was elected president of the Department of Ohio in 1889. During that term, her administrating reached its zenith of power and influence.

In San Francisco in 1903, at the 22nd annual convention of the WRC, she was elected National President without a dissenting vote. Winans began her first work of patriotism immediately following her election as National President, by placing in National Headquarters a large silk flag. She made the presentation speech of a flag to the University of Tennessee. The WRC's National Order was incorporated during Winans' term of office, and signed by Winans, Kate Brownlee Sherwood, Clara Barton, Mary M. North, Sarah E. Phillips, and Lizabeth A. Turner.

When her year was finished at National President of the WRC, she found that there was other work to do. She was made a member of the Andersonville Prison Park Board, and when the chair position was made vacant by the death of Lizabeth A. Turner, Winans was asked to fill the vacancy. She served six years on the Board out of the twelve the WRC owned it. Hundreds of bearing pecan trees and 400 rose bushes which she helped train with her hands contribute to the memory of the 13,920 soldiers lying in the cemetery. On May 30, 1911, she presented a monument and tablet (upon which were memorialized the history of the gift of the park to the WRC, and their transfer of it to the United States Government) to Belle C. Harris, national president of the WRC, who in turn presented it to a representative of the Government, Captain Bryant. It stands within the stockade at Andersonville. She was for 14 years on the board of the Andersonville Prison Improvement Association.

Her most forcible speech was delivered at the executive session of the National Council of Women of the United States at Indianapolis, February 2, 1904; her subject was "Peace and Arbitration," giving its fundamental principle as love, serving charity without ostentation.

Winans was a regent of the Memorial University at Mason City, Iowa, established by the Grand Army of the Republic (GAR) and the WRC. She was made a member of the Board of National Order of Patriotic Workers of America; she was the only woman on the Board.

== Personal life ==
Mr. and Mrs. Winans lived in Toledo, Ohio. The couple had two sons, Harry (1868–1911) and Frank (1871–1914).

Sarah D. Winans had been in failing health during her last year. After being stricken by two strokes, she died at the family residence in Toledo, Ohio, June 4, 1915.
