= Charity Rusk Craig =

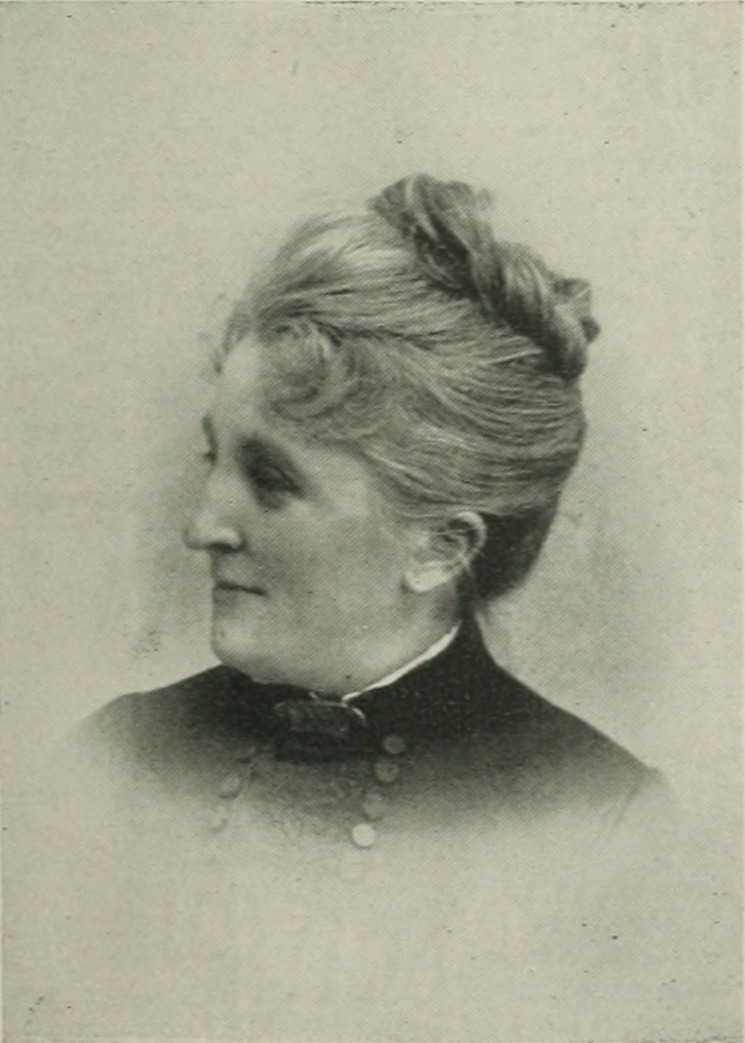
- Portrait from A Woman of the Century
- Born: Charity Ariel Rusk; December 20, 1849; Malta, Ohio, U.S.
- Died: November 11, 1913 (aged 63); Skyland, North Carolina, U.S.
- Education: University of Wisconsin
- Known for: National President, Woman's Relief Corps
- Spouse: Elmer Horace Craig (m. 1875; died 1898)
- Father: Jeremiah McLain Rusk
- Relatives: Lycurgus J. Rusk (brother)

Charity Rusk Craig (1849–1913) was a civic-minded leader of an American charitable organization, serving as the sixth National President of the Woman's Relief Corps (WRC).

== Early life and education ==
Charity Ariel Rusk was born in Malta, Ohio, December 20, 1849. She went with her parents to Wisconsin when about three years of age. Her father was Jeremiah McLain Rusk, who served as Governor of Wisconsin and U.S. Secretary of Agriculture. Her mother's maiden name was Mary Martin (1832–1856). In addition to Charity, the couple had two additional children: Lycurgus (b. 1851) and Mary (b. 1853). After Mary's death, Gov. Rusk remarried, his second wife being Elizabeth (née, Johnson) (b. 1838). Their four children were Alonzo (b. 1858), Ida (b. 1859), Mary (b. 1862), and Blaine (b. 1874).

At the age of thirteen, Charily Rusk entered a Catholic school. St. Clara Female Academy, where she remained for one year. She then entered a private school in Madison, Wisconsin, and from that went to the University of Wisconsin, where she was graduated in 1867, and afterward continued studying Latin and literature. She continued her studies even during the four years spent in Washington, D.C., when her father was a member of the U.S. House of Representatives.

== Career ==
In 1875, she married a classical student of the University of Wisconsin, Elmer Horace Craig (1847–1898). They spent a year in Milwaukee, Wisconsin, and a year in Boston, Massachusetts. Mr. Craig was connected with the United States Pension Department. Resigning his position in order to connect himself with the banking firm of Lindeman & Rusk, he moved to Viroqua, Wisconsin where Mrs. Craig became the center of a coterie of distinguished people, the Rusk homestead being located in Viroqua. In summer, it was frequented by the Gov. Rusk and his family and more intimate friends.

After having been prominently identified with various local charities and conspicuously interested in women's organizations for a considerable period of time, Craig became a charter member of the WRC, auxiliary to the Grand Army of the Republic (GAR). Firstly, she was president of the WRC in Viroqua, then president of the Wisconsin State department, and was finally elected the national president. While serving as department president, she visited many places in the State for the purpose of awakening the interest of the Woman's Relief Corps and the GAR in the Wisconsin Veterans Home in Waupaca, Wisconsin. As national president, she consolidated the work and introduced a new system of accounts, which was more successful. She was instrumental in extending the work into new States, and laid the foundations for a wide increase of membership.

After removing to Asheville, North Carolina in 1898, Craig considered that the then existing telephone system was inadequate, and cooperating with the Proctors of Wisconsin, constructed an independent telephone system which soon controlled the local field. With the development of the long-distance lines, the system was sold to the Bell Telephone Company, and Craig invested in Oklahoma, retaining her residence and interests in North Carolina. She was also one of the organizers of the local YWCA in Raleigh, North Carolina.

== Personal life ==
She was a Charter Member of the Daughters of the American Revolution, and a member of the First Presbyterian Church.

Charity Rusk Craig died from pneumonia at her home in Skyland, North Carolina, November 11, 1913.
