= Mary Jewett Telford =

American writer

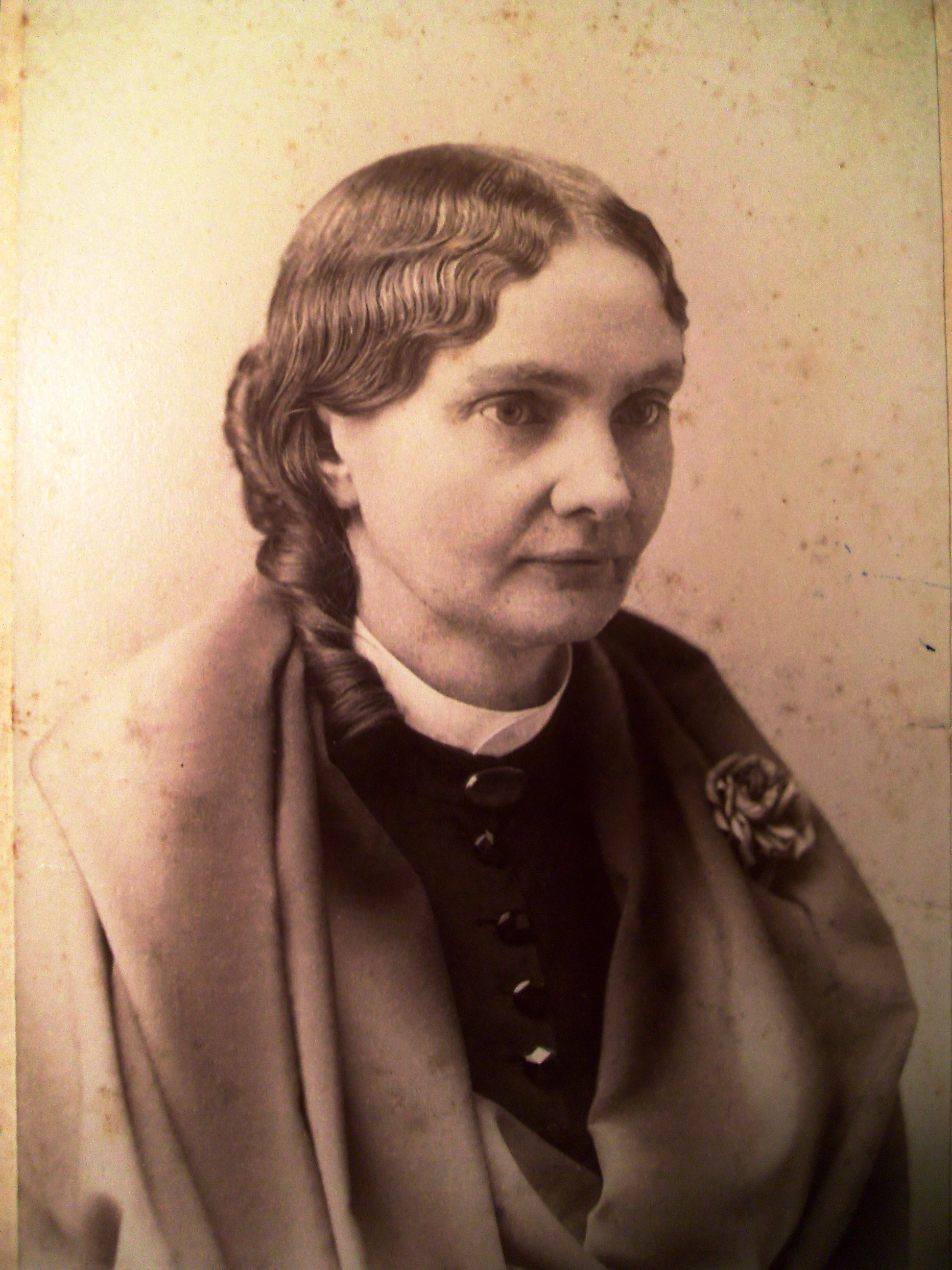
Mary Jewett Telford

Mary Jewett Telford (March 18, 1839 – August 5, 1906) a nurse at Hospital No. 8 in Nashville, Tennessee, during the American Civil War. In her later years, Telford was a published writer, editor of numerous journals, lecturer on the temperance circuit and charter member of the Woman's Relief Corps, an auxiliary to the Grand Army of the Republic.

== Early life ==
Mary Jewett was born in Seneca, New York on March 18, 1839. Jewett's father and mother, Lester Jewett and Hannah Southwick Jewett, were already parents to five children. After Jewett’s birth, another four children would join the family. The Jewetts lost infants Ruth and Oakley within days of each other in 1846. After their burial at Old No. 9 Cemetery in Seneca, the family made the decision to move to Lima Township, Michigan, to be closer to Lester’s brothers, who had migrated there in the 1820s. In Lima, Lester built a cobblestone house that stands today. Nathan, Jewett’s youngest sibling, was born in Lima.

== Civil War ==
By the age of 14, Jewett was teaching in the district school. Later, she spent one year teaching at Morganfield, Kentucky, before returning home to Michigan. It was there that her younger brother, William T. Jewett, enlisted in the 4th Michigan Cavalry. Four months later, William was dead from typhoid fever.

Jewett longed to assist the soldiers convalescing from their wounds. Although she was denied a nursing position by the U.S. Sanitary Commission because she was too young, she persisted. Michigan Governor Austin Blair, a friend of her father’s, gave her a special permit and Jewett was off to war.

She worked at Hospital No. 8 in Nashville, Tennessee, for eight months, the sole woman in a hospital occupied by six hundred soldiers. Jewett did her best to keep up with the requests for water and the calls for assistance of all kinds. After a year Jewett left the nursing job, shattered in health and spirits.

== Post-war years ==
After the war Jewtt married Jacob Telford of the 15th Indiana Infantry Regiment. Mary and Jacob married on July 8, 1864, at her home in Lima, Michigan. Jacob, nearly six years older than Mary, was also native to Seneca, New York. One day on her daily rounds at Hospital No. 8, she came across him again and recognized his clear blue eyes and shy grin. Jacob had been severely wounded at Murfreesboro, Tennessee.

== Contributions to society ==
A move from Iowa to Denver, Colorado Territory was made in 1873 in hopes of improving Telford’s asthmatic condition. In Denver, Telford’s abilities took wing. A writer since her teenage years, Telford’s short children’s story, "Tom", was published in St. Nicholas Magazine in 1880. In July 1883, Telford became a charter member of the Woman’s Relief Corps (an auxiliary of the Grand Army of the Republic), which was dedicated to assisting veterans, their wives and their children. Later the same year, Telford was appointed to the Child-Saving Work committee on the Board of Charities and Corrections. In 1884, she founded, edited and published The Challenge, a temperance journal which espoused the ideas of the Woman’s Christian Temperance Union (W.C.T.U.). In the late 1880s, Telford became the editor of the Colorado Farmer journal, while contributing articles to newspapers in cities around the country.

The United States House Committee on Invalid Pensions passed a bill on May 24, 1892 granting a pension to Mary Jewett Telford, based on her service as a nurse during the Civil War. Less than two weeks later, Telford applied for her pension. The money was surely welcomed, considering that the Telfords’ income consisted of Jacob’s $8 a month government pension from his service in the 15th Indiana Infantry, and from any money Telford brought in with her writing and editing ventures.

She continued writing and editing and began to tour the country as a lecturer on the temperance circuit. She counted W.C.T.U. founder Frances Willard as a friend.

Sometime in late 1900 or 1901, the Telfords moved once again, to McMinnville, Tennessee. It was there, in 1905, that Jacob died. Telford had him buried at Stones River National Cemetery, the former battlefield on which he had been wounded years before.

== Final years ==
About a year after her husnand's death Telford went to the Hinsdale Sanitarium in Hinsdale, Illinois for care. She died on August 5, 1906 following a critical operation. She was buried in Illinois.
