= Elizabeth D'Arcy Kinne =

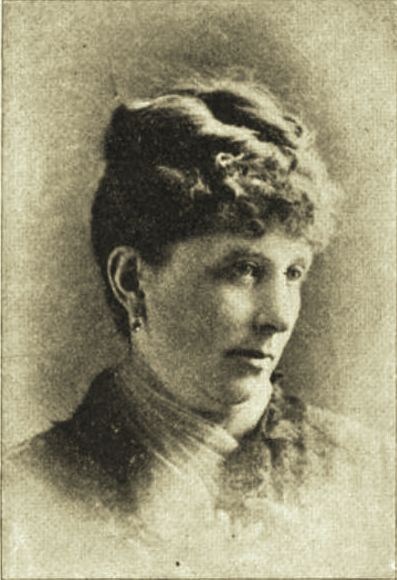
- Portrait photo from The New England Magazine, 1890
- Born: Elizabeth K D'Arcy; March 26, 1843; Boston, Massachusetts, U.S.
- Died: January 8, 1918 (aged 74); Berkeley, California, U.S.
- Known for: National President, Woman's Relief Corps
- Spouse: Charles Mason Kinne (m. 1864; died 1913)

Elizabeth D'Arcy Kinne (March 26, 1843 – January 8, 1918) was the leader of an American charitable organization, serving as the fourth National President of the Woman's Relief Corps (WRC). She lived in the San Francisco Bay Area for 52 years, making her home in San Francisco the greater part of the time. Kinne was a pioneer clubwoman of Berkeley, California.

== Early life ==
Elizabeth K D'Arcy was born and educated in Boston, March 26, 1843. Her parents were Francis D'Arcy (1804–1857) and Eleanor (née, Phinney; 1806–1886). She was descended on her mother's side from an old New England family who bore the name of Phinney. They were of English origin, and among the first settlers on Cape Cod. Her father was of French descent. Elizabeth's siblings were: John, Eleanor, Cyrus, Sarah, Melissa, James, George, and Alice.

== Career ==
"Our Veterans and Their Commanders," a caricature of California Grand Army of the Republic members published in The Wasp, April 25, 1885. Kinne's husband stands second from left.

At the time the civil war broke out, C. Mason Kinne (1841–1913), who became her husband, was in California, but he hastened back east to join the Union Army. At the time of their marriage, in April 1864, he was Adjutant of the 2nd Massachusetts Cavalry Regiment. He served with Philip Sheridan in the Valley campaigns of 1864 till the close of the war in 1865.

After some months spent in visiting among friends in Massachusetts and New York, the newlyweds removed to California. Mr. Kinne became a charter member of the Grand Army of the Republic (GAR) Lincoln Post, San Francisco, in 1868. From that time on, Mrs. Kinne took a deep interest in the work of the GAR, and worked to advance the interests of that Order. She was particularly active in measures to raise funds for the Posts, and in arranging for their social gatherings.

She assisted in establishing the Soldiers' Home in Yountville, California, an institution in which her husband was deeply interested. He drove the first stake for the original building, and was for four years president of the Association which carried the enterprise through to completion. It was natural that Mrs. Kinne should feel interested in the movement among women for organized work in connection with the GAR. She organized WRC Lincoln Corps, of San Francisco, and was elected president, and was identified with it thereafter. While president of Lincoln Corps, she raised US$1,000 to purchase bedding and other comforts for the Soldiers' Home.

In 1884, she was appointed Provisional Department President of California, and in 1885, organized a permanent department and was elected Department President.

She was elected National Senior Vice-president at the WRC's Portland, Maine Convention in 1885, and National President in 1886. The work of the Order was advanced during her term of office. Three new permanent departments were formed and 305 corps added to the roster, and 12,958 members were added to the roll, and the charity work was brought up to US$56,106.

Mrs. Kinne was the presiding officer at the St. Louis, Missouri Convention in 1887. A great many important questions came before that body for consideration, and although at times, she differed with the majority of the convention, yet she accepted the decisions reached as the law of the Order, and harmony was maintained throughout the entire session. She was elected chair of the executive board for 1887, and re-elected to the same position the following year.

She inaugurated the movement in the Department of California for the establishment of a WRC Home for Army nurses, soldiers' widows and mothers, and the orphan children of soldiers. It was located at Evergreen, a district of San Jose, California.

== Personal life ==
The Kinnes had three children: Frank, Eleanor, and Alice.

Kinne lived in the San Francisco Bay Area for 52 years, making her home in San Francisco the greater part of the time. She died in Berkeley, California, January 8, 1918.
