= Emma Stark Hampton =

American charitable organization leader

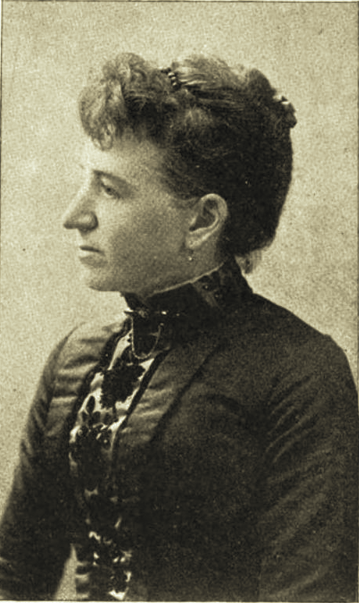
- The New England Magazine, 1890
- Born: Emma Stark; January 15, 1843; Sweden, New York, U.S.
- Died: February 22, 1925 (aged 82); Detroit, Michigan, U.S.
- Burial place: Beech Ridge Cemetery, Brockport, New York, U.S.
- Education: Western Normal School, Brockport (now, SUNY Brockport)
- Organization(s): National President, Woman's Relief Corps
- Spouse: Charles G. Hampton (m. 1868; died 1917)
- Children: 2

Emma Stark Hampton (1843–1925) was an American charitable organization leader who served as the fifth National President of the Woman's Relief Corps (WRC). Her four decades of service in the organization included Corps President, Department President, National President, National Counselor five times, Chair of the Committee on Revisions for several years, WRC delegate to the National Council of Women of the United States, and Secretary of the WRC Home at Madison, Ohio, for years. From 1884 to her death, she missed but one WRC National Convention.

== Early life and education ==
Emma Stark was born January 15, 1843, in the Township of Sweden, near Brockport, New York. She was the daughter of Israel Buell Stark and Caroline Fellows, his wife. Her father, an evangelist among early Erie Canal boatmen, was descended from the Revolutionary Starks, and he reared his family in an atmosphere of Christian culture, in which patriotic devotion was distinctly stressed. Emma had eight older siblings.

She was educated in the public schools of her town and graduated from the Western Normal School, of Brockport (now, SUNY Brockport).

== Career ==
When the Civil War broke out, her father became a member of the Christian Commission and Emma entered into all the forms of philanthropic relief work organized by the women of her community. Her brother, Major Milo L. Stark, died at the Battle of the Wilderness.

She taught for a few years before her marriage. Hampton was a literary woman. She represented the WRC in the National Council of Women of the United States, from 1906 to 1911, inclusive.

Hampton was a members of the Detroit Woman Writers' Club, and was elected to a life membership shortly before her last illness. She belonged to Stanwix Chapter, Daughters of the American Revolution, of Rome, New York. Within the WRC, she became a charter member of a charter Corps in the formation of the Department of Michigan, WRC, on March 5, 1884. She was the first President of Fairbanks Corps, No. 10, Detroit. In 1885, she was elected the second President of the Department of Michigan, and during her term of office, she formed 51 Corps, the record number during any administration of the State till that time.

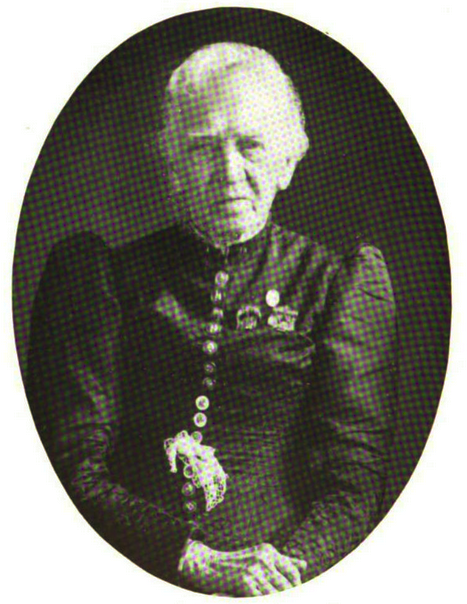
Journal of the 43rd Convention of the National WRC, 1925

In 1887, in the City of St. Louis, Missouri, she was elected National President of the WRC. The next year, she became the National Counselor and started an important labor which endured for years: the Revision Committee, of which she was chair. It was a matter of record that all of the WRC's printed work passed through Hampton in revision. Her careful study, continued for many years, made her perfect in understanding the organizations laws; she knew the Rituals, the Service Books, the Rules and Regulations, and was the recognized authority on the laws and usages of the WRC.

== Personal life ==
In 1868, she married Capt. Charles G. Hampton and they located in Detroit, Michigan in 1873. The couple and their two sonsm Arthur S. and Dr. Charles G. Hampton, became identified with the life of this city. They attended the First Baptist Church.

Emma Stark Hampton made her home in Detroit, where died February 22, 1925, after a brief illness. She was buried in Beech Ridge Cemetery, Brockport, New York.
