= Loss Creek =

Loss Creek may refer to one of several streams:

== Canada ==
- Loss Creek (British Columbia), in Capital Regional District, British Columbia

== United States ==
- Loss Creek, in Spring Creek Township, Coffey County, Kansas
- Loss Creek, in Black Wolf Township, Ellsworth County, Kansas
- Loss Creek, a river in Ohio
- Loss Creek, a tributary of the Hiwassee River in Polk County, Tennessee
- Loss Creek (Texas), in Coleman County, Texas

== See also ==
- Lost Creek (disambiguation)
