= Hannah Tyler Wilcox =

American physician

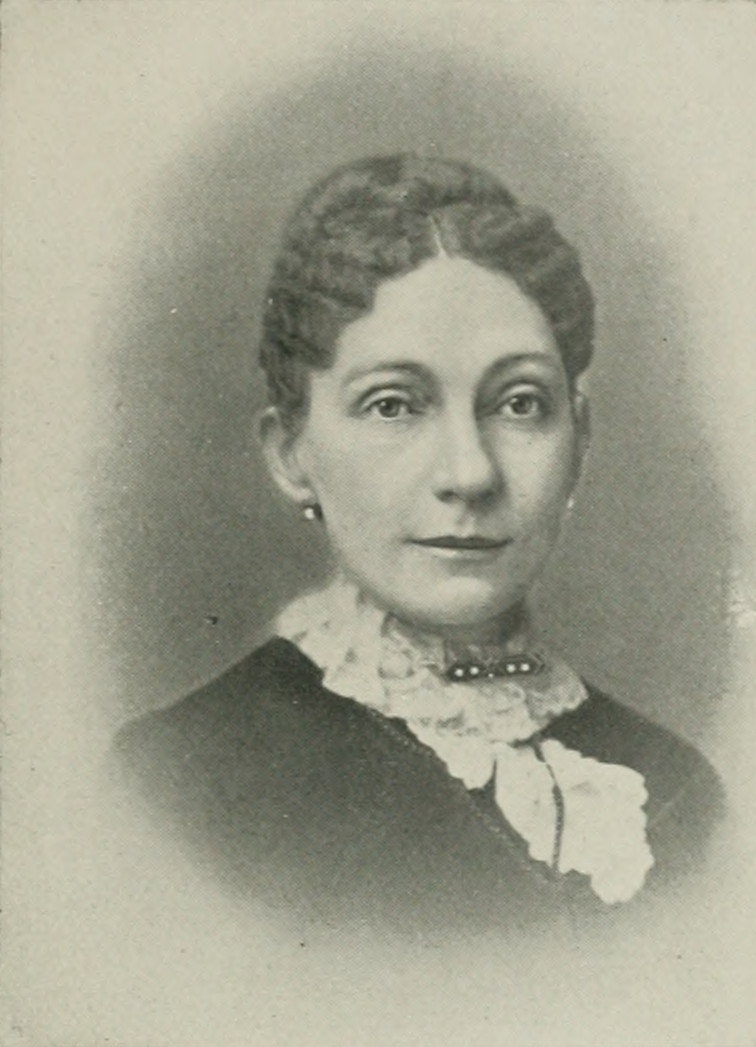
"A Woman of the Century"

Hannah Tyler Wilcox (August 31, 1838-Nov. 22, 1909) was an American physician.

== Early life ==
Hannah Tyler was born in Boonville, New York, on August 31, 1838. Her father, Amos Tyler, was a cousin of President John Tyler. His liberal ideas on the subject of woman's education were far in advance of his generation. Her mother's father, Joseph Lawton, was a patron of education and one of the founders of the first medical college in New York, in Fairfield, Herkimer County. His home and purse were open to the students and professors, and thus Elizabeth Lawton learned to love the science of medicine, though not permitted to study it.

Hannah Tyler attended the academies in Holland Patent, New York, and Rome, New York, and, being desirous of a higher education than could there be obtained, she went to the Pennsylvania Female College, near Philadelphia, where she was graduated with honors in 1860.

== Career ==
A call came to the president of the college for a teacher to take charge of an academy in southwest Missouri. This involved a journey 300 miles by stage coach south of St. Louis, Missouri. Tyler resolved to accept the position, and in one year she built up a successful school, when the civil war made it unsafe for a teacher of northern views to remain, and she returned to her native town.

She entered into the medical profession with her husband and studied in the various schools, the allopathic, eclectic, and later, desiring to know if there was any best in "pathies" of medicine, she took a degree in the homeopathic school in St. Louis, where she resided many years. She was a believer in the curative powers of electricity, and many of her cures were on record, with the skillful use of various means of healing the sick. She encouraged her colleagues to investigate the physiological and psychological benefits of oxytocic electricity to obviate the need for drugs and forceps during delivery and prevent postpartum hemorrhage.

Her great aim was the advancement of her sex. She was prominent in all the great movements of and for women, the Woman's Christian Temperance Union, the Woman's Relief Corps and the educational and industrial unions. She was a member of the National American Institute of Homoeopathy, and was a delegate from St. Louis and Missouri to the convention in Saratoga Springs, New York, in 1887. She was medical examiner for ten years for the Order of Chosen Friends.

Her lectures on health and dress for women aided materially in reform.

== Personal life ==
In 1862, Hannah Tyler married Dr M. W. Wilcox, of Rochester, New York. They went to Warrensburg, Missouri, and there witnessed some of the stirring scenes of that period of national strife. Three times they witnessed the alternation of Federal and Confederate rule.

In 1887, her health failed from overwork, and she sought the invigorating climate of southern California, in Los Angeles. When her health was restored, she returned to her home in St. Louis.

She was a widow for many years and had one living son. In 1892, she moved to Chicago, Illinois.

She died at her home in St. Louis on November 22, 1909 at the age of 71.
