= Isabel Worrell Ball =

American journalist and newspaper editor

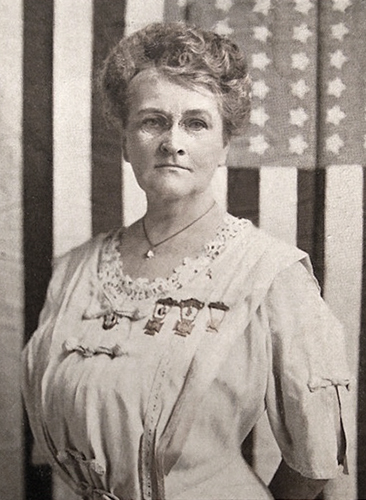
Photo of Isabel Worrell Ball from a Woman's Auxiliary Corps postcard ca. 1912.

Sarah Isabel Worrell Ball McElroy (March 13, 1855 – July 5, 1931) was an American journalist and newspaper editor. She worked first in the western United States and later in Washington, D.C., where she became one of the first women admitted to the United States Senate Daily Press Gallery. She was active in the Woman's Relief Corps and became the editor of the National Tribune, a weekly publication of the Grand Army of the Republic.

== Early life and family ==
Sarah Isabel (or Isabelle) Worrell was born near Hennepin, Illinois, one of nine children of Elizabeth (McClung) Worrell and James Purcell Worrell, a lawyer and American Civil War veteran who had served with an Illinois regiment. In 1873, her family moved to western Kansas. She was educated partly in public schools and partly by her father.

In 1877 she married Henry M. Ball (ca. 1852–1920), with whom she had a child who died at the age of three.

== Career ==
Ball's first job was as a public school teacher in Pawnee County, Kansas. She want on to serve as a clerk for the Kansas Legislature (1876–86) and became the second woman to be appointed a notary public in Kansas.

In 1881, Ball began working as a journalist and correspondent for the Albuquerque Journal and the Kansas City Times. One of her first major beats was reporting from the field on construction of the Atlantic and Pacific Railroad line between Albuquerque, New Mexico, and Needles, California.

In 1883, she returned to Kansas and took up a position as editor of the Larned Chronoscope. In the later 1880s, she also worked again for the Kansas City Times as well as for the Kansas City Star (1889–91).

In 1886, she moved to Topeka, where she was appointed assistant secretary of the Kansas State Historical Society.

In 1889, she was one of a group of Western writers who founded the Western Authors' and Artists' Club. Ball served as the club's secretary.

In 1891, she moved to Washington, D.C., where she worked for the Washington Star. In connection with this job, she became one of the first woman admitted to the press gallery of the U.S. Senate, where she noted that her arrival was greeted "with the enthusiasm of a case of smallpox".

During this period of her life, Ball became heavily involved with the Woman's Relief Corps (WRC), an auxiliary of the veteran's fraternal organization known as the Grand Army of the Republic (GAR). She was a vice-president of the WRC and a member of its executive board as well as president of its department of the Potomac. She was associate editor of the National Tribune, the GAR's weekly publication, for which she wrote Susan B. Anthony's obituary in 1906. She also wrote for the Daughters of the American Revolution Magazine.

Ball died in Washington, D.C., in 1931. A collection of documents relating to Ball's life is held by the Kansas Historical Society.
