= Lost Creek Township =

Lost Creek Township may refer to one of the following places in the United States:

- Lost Creek Township, Vigo County, Indiana
- Lost Creek Township, Wayne County, Missouri
- Lost Creek Township, Platte County, Nebraska
- Lostcreek Township, Miami County, Ohio
