= Margaret Ray Wickens =

American public affairs organizer, social reformer and charitable organization leader

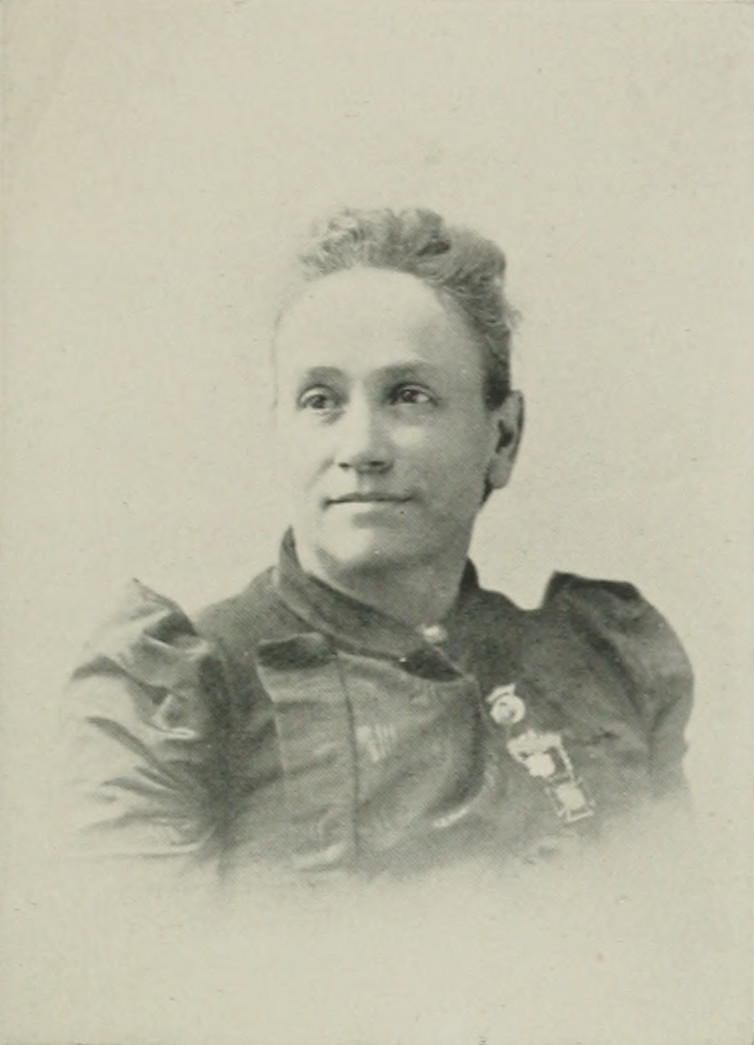
- Photo portrait from A Woman of the Century
- Born: Margaret Ray Wickens; 3 August 1843; Indianapolis, Indiana, U.S.
- Died: 24 November 1918 (aged 75); Atkinson, Illinois, U.S.
- Organizations: Kansas State Assembly of Rebekahs; WCTU
- Known for: National President, Woman's Relief Corps
- Spouse: Thomas Wiley Wickens
- Children: 5
- Parent(s): Thomas Brown and Judith Bennett

Margaret Ray Wickens (August 3, 1843 – November 24, 1918) was an American public affairs organizer, social reformer, and charitable organization leader who served as tenth National President of the Woman's Relief Corps (WRC). Eloquent, Wickins was called the "Golden-tongued orator of the Woman's Relief Corps". Her executive abilities during the years that she was actively engaged in WRC advanced the organization's patriotic work. As an orator, philanthropist and industrial worker, Wickens had no peer. She served as president of the Kansas State Assembly of Rebekahs, and was active in the temperance movement, filling the role of district president of her Woman's Christian Temperance Union (WCTU) for several years. She was a teacher, a member of the Daughters of the American Revolution (DAR), and a prominent Good Templar. In her later life, she held a number of state positions in Illinois.

== Early life ==
Margaret Ray Brown was born in Indianapolis, Indiana, August 3, 1843. (Note: According to the Woman's Relief Corps National Convention's publication (1919), Margaret was born October 3, 1843.) Her father, Thomas Brown, was a native of County Dublin, Ireland. Her mother was Judith Bennett, of Cumberland County, New Jersey, a descendant of the Bennetts of Mayflower and Revolutionary fame. Margaret was the older of a family of two daughters.

In 1854, the family moved to Henderson, Kentucky. Their aboliltonist sentiment was strong, and their house became a station on the Underground Railroad. For having aided needy African American fugitives, Mr. Brown was imprisoned in Frankfort, Kentucky for three years, and his family were compelled to remove to the North. In 1857, he was released and joined his family in Indianapolis. There he was honored by a public reception, in which William Lloyd Garrison and other prominent men participated. In 1859, the family removed to Loda, Illinois and two years later, Thomas Brown enlisted in the Tenth Illinois Cavalry, but he was not strong enough to enter the service, and he was obliged to remain at home.

== Career ==
Margaret taught in the Loda high school, where her sister, Harriet, was also employed. She did all she could do to aid the Union cause during the civil war. She organized aid societics, assisted in the distributing of supplies, helped in the hospitals and did everything in her power to ameliorate the condition of the sick and suffering.

In 1864, she married Thomas Wiley Wickens (d. 1893), and they removed to Kankakee, Illinois. They had five children.

Wickens was a temperance advocate from childhood. She joined the Good Templars in Indianapolis, and was one of the first members of the Illinois WCTU. In that order, she worked for prohibition legislation in Kansas. She served as district president of her union for several years and went as delegate to the national convention in Minneapolis.

In 1876, the family removed to Sabetha, Kansas, where she gained prominence in public affairs.

She was, in 1885, elected Department President of the Kansas WRC; reelected in 1886. During her term as the second president, her department grew from 59 to 149 organized corps in two years. She attended the national convention in San Francisco, and was there appointed national inspector, which position she resigned in order to care for her State department. She served her department two years as counselor, as a member of the department and national executive boards. In the St. Louis convention, she was elected a member of the executive board. In 1891, she was made a trustee and general agent for the United States of the National Grand Army of the Republic Memorial College at Oberlin, Kansas. In Detroit, August 5, 1891, she was elected National Senior Vice-President of the WRC. In October of that year, she was elected State president of the Rebekahs of Kansas.

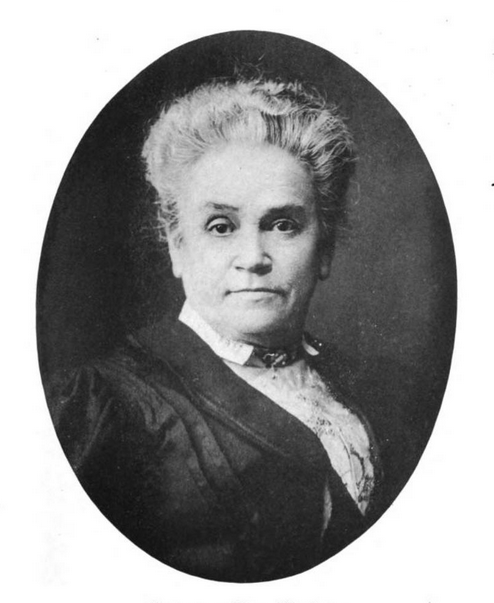
Undated photo

In the Washington, D.C. convention, September 24, 1892, she was elected National President of the WRC. Her convention was held in Indianapolis. She was present at the dedication of the National Woman's Relief Corps Home, and received the important donation from the Ohio Legislature. It was in her year that the WRC became a member of the National Council of Women. Her year as National President was one of great prominence in the WRC, because of her National Headquarters in Chicago at the time of the World's Columbian Exposition. When the national organization was discussing whether it would or would not admit other than those who were consanguinous relations of old soldiers, Wickens was one of the strongest supports of the "loyal woman". Oddly enough for one of her patriotic character, Wickens had not a single relative so far she knew in the Civil War. In the plea which she presented to the national convention against the proposed closing of the ranks of the WRC to all but the blood relations of old soldiers, she made the statement that she was just as loyal to the Union and its defenders as any woman in the U.S. If this proposed clause in the constitution carried, she would be shut out from participation in a work to which she had already devoted many years, although not a member of any organization. She thought it a mistake, she said, to narrow the lines of membership because the time was coming when the families of old soldiers would narrow until the tax which must be levied to support the WRC could fall so heavily upon them as to become burdensome. So eloquent was the plea made by Wickens that the women of the convention adopted her ideas and "loyal" women were admitted into the W.R.C.

Wickens closed a session of the National Council of Women conference in Washington, D.C., 1895, with a paper on "New Thought and the True Thought for Philanthropy". She labored to establish scholarships in the College at Manhattan when its friends sought to make the teaching of patriotism its foremost principle. She returned to Illinois and served as superintendent of the state training school for girls, a state institution just being started, and here she did pioneer work. Later, she was connected with the industrial school for girls at Evanston, Illinois. After this, she acted as superintendent of the Soldiers Home for War Widows of Illinois before returning to her daughter's home to rest.

In October 1902, Wickens attended the National Association of Army Nurses reception held in Washington, and spoke on the subject, "The Hand That Rocks the Cradle Rules the World". By 1911, she was the Superintendent of the Edgar County Children's Home, at Paris, Illinois. In October of that year, she attended the Illinois state conference of charities and corrections. After her failing health caused her to relinquish all work, she once again she returned to her daughter's home.

Wilkens was a member of the Methodist church.

== Death and legacy ==
On November 24, 1918, Wilkens died at the home of her daughter, Mrs. Jesse Goodman, in Atkinson, Illinois. She was buried in Sabetha, Kansas, beside her husband and four of her children.

On September 11, 1921, a granite memorial was erected by the WRC in Sabetha to the memory of Wickens.
