= Agnes Hitt =

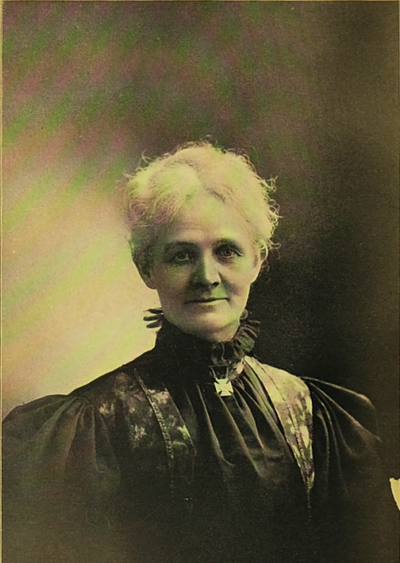
- Hitt in 1897
- Born: Agnes Kercheval; September 27, 1845; Greencastle, Indiana, U.S.
- Died: September 8, 1919 (aged 73); Indianapolis, Indiana
- Occupations: National president, Woman's Relief Corps

Signature
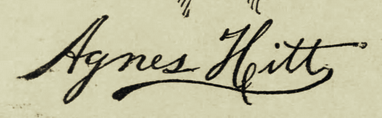

Agnes Hitt (née Kercheval; 1845–1919) was an American charity worker and social leader who served as the fourteenth national president of the Woman's Relief Corps (WRC). During her tenure, there were 35 departments and 54 detached corps, with a membership of 140,135.

== Early life ==
Agnes Kercheval was born in Greencastle, Indiana on September 27, 1845. Her parents had moved there from Kentucky several years before the Civil War. Her father, Edward Kercheval, was a captain in the Union army. One of their oldest friends was Governor Oliver P. Morton of Indiana. Hitt's father and her only brother enlisted as soon as the call came for volunteers.

== Career ==
Hitt joined the WRC in 1885, and was made Secretary of her corps in 1887. The following year, she served on the Board of the National WRC Home at Madison, Ohio. She was afterward elected President of the same corps, and served in that capacity for three months, when she resigned to accept the Department Presidency of Indiana. In this position she served for thirteen months. Later, she held the position of National Aid for one year and of assistant National Inspector for two years. In 1895, she took over the office of National Inspector.

In 1896, after being elected national president of the WRC, she visited many parts of the country, and her acquaintance with members of the organization throughout the country was wide. Hitt was considered the mother of the flag service of the WRC. While serving as national president, Hitt conceived the idea of closely associating the Grand Army of veterans of the Civil War with the flag they defended, by making the display of the flag a conspicuous part of the ritualistic work of the WRC. By calling others to her aid to formulate the drills, the flag service with its staff of color-bearers was adopted during her administration.

Besides her activity in the WRC, Hitt assisted in the work of the Grand Army of the Republic. She was well known for her acts of charity, and her work for patriotic teaching in the public schools.

== Personal life ==
Two years after the war, Agnes married Major Wilber F. Hitt, who, when only twenty years of age, was assistant adjutant general of a brigade, and then for meritorious conduct on the battlefield, was brevetted captain and major. The couple lived in Indianapolis, Indiana.

She died in Indianapolis, on September 8, 1919. Survived by her husband, she was the last member of her own family.
