= Sarah C. Mink =

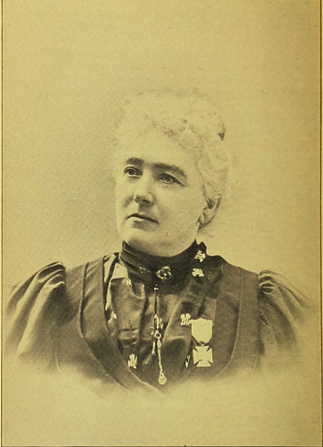
- Born: Sarah C. Wells; April 7, 1837; Mayfield, New York, U.S.
- Died: December 3, 1896 (aged 59); Watertown, New York, U.S.
- Known for: 11th National President of the Woman's Relief Corps
- Spouse: Charles E. Mink (m. 1865)

Sarah C. Mink (1837–1896) was a 19th-century American leader of a charitable organization who served as the 11th National President of the Woman's Relief Corps (WRC). She was the first to be unanimously elected to this position.

== Early life ==
Sarah C. Wells was born in Mayfield, New York, April 7, 1837. She was of American Revolutionary War ancestry. Her parents were Richard W. Wells (1800–1850) and Sarah (née, Cline) Wells (1805–1868); her siblings were Elizabeth, John, and Alice.

== Career ==
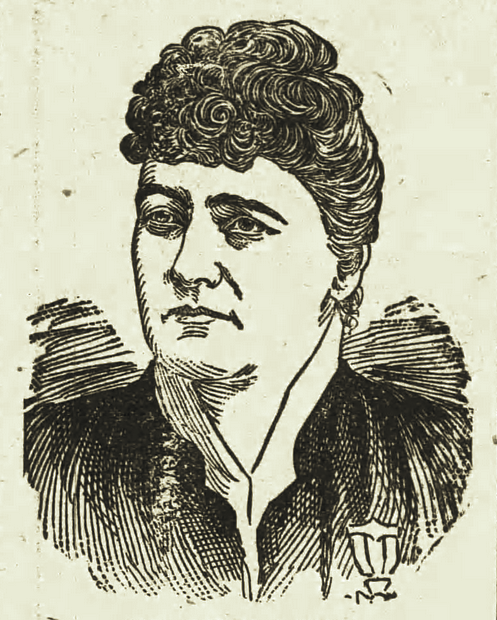
The Times Record, 1896

When the WRC was organized in the State of New York, Mink helped build the order. She was first elected President of the WRC of Root Post, Syracuse, New York, circa 1884, an office she filled for three consecutive years. At the close of this service she was elected Department President, and served in this capacity three more years.

At Indianapolis, Indiana, in September 1893, Mink was elected National President of the WRC, her election to that office being the first one ever effected unanimously. This Convention marked a milestone in the history of the WRC. Resolutions were adopted advocating the introduction of patriotic teaching in U.S. public schools, a subject which was till this time ignored by educators and legislators. It was a source of great pride and satisfaction to Mink that as National President she was the first to appoint a Committee on Patriotic Instruction, which committee represented seven States and was able during her administration to carry out in a large measure the decisions of the Convention upon this vital point.

== Personal life ==
On October 10, 1865, she married Major Charles E. Mink (1835–1912).

Sarah C. Mink resided for many years in Watertown, New York, where she died December 3, 1896.

On Memorial Day, 1897, a granite block was placed over her grave at Albany, New York. The U.S. flag is cut on its face. Beneath her name is her own injunction, taken from her address to the Twelfth National Convention in recommending for their adoption the work of patriotic teaching.
