= Della Whitney Norton =

American poet

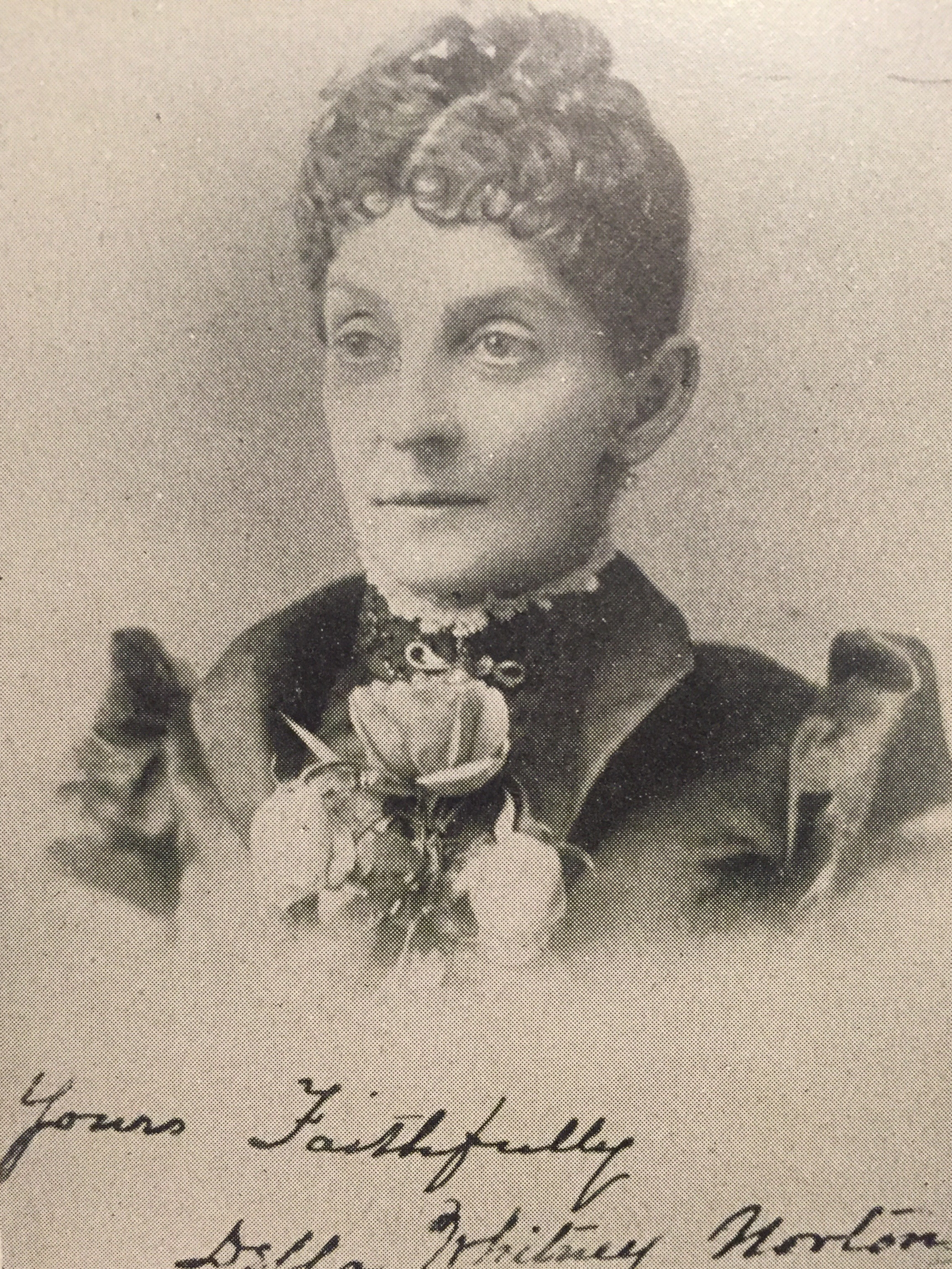
- "A Woman of the Century"
- Born: 1841
- Died: 23 Jan 1937 (aged 95–96)
- Spouse: Henry B Norton

Della E. Whitney Norton (January 1, 1840 - January 23, 1937) was an American poet, author and Christian Scientist.

== Early life ==
Della E. Whitney was born in Fort Edward, New York, on January 1, 1840. She was educated mainly in Fort Edward Academy.

== Career ==
Della Whitney Norton started to write at an early age. Before her twelfth year, she was a regular contributor, as Della E. Whitney, to several Boston and New York papers and magazines. The Boston Cultivator published her first literary efforts. Afterward she contributed to The Galaxy, Scribner's Magazine, The Ladies' Repository, the Christian Union, the Advance, the Boston Repository and other journals.

The International Sunday-School Association offered prizes for the best hymns on the lessons for the year. Norton wrote fifty-nine hymns in about ten days, which were accepted, and among eight-hundred competitors she won three first prizes.

Madame Parepa Rosa, the Italian prima donna, sent her manager on a journey of five-hundred miles to request of Norton a song for concert purposes, when Norton wrote the poem, "Do Not Slam the Gate" which was sung and published the world over.

In spite of delicate health, she worked with the church and participated in humanitarian activities. The Woman's Christian Temperance Union, Woman Suffrage Association, Woman's Relief Corps, Woman's Industrial Exchange, hospital boards and private charities absorbed her time for many years to the almost entire exclusion of literary labor.

Surgeons and physicians made little progress in helping her. Her later recovery led some to believe that God had healed her. Since then, she dedicated her time to trying to heal others through god and spreading the ideas of Christian Science. She was ordained for the public ministry.

== Personal life ==
Della Whitney Norton became an disabled when thirteen years of age, and for many years suffered excruciating pain. In January, 1874, she married Henry B. Norton (1842-1925), of Rochester, New York. She had one son, Frank Whitney Norton.

She lived in Minneapolis, Minnesota.

She died on January 23, 1937, and is buried at Lakewood Cemetery, Minneapolis.
