= Emma Gilson Wallace =

American philanthropist (1841–1911)

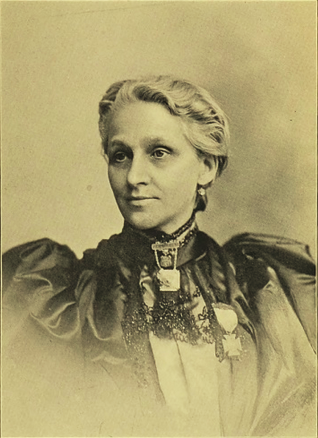
Journal, 13th Convention, National Woman's Relief Corps, 1895

signature

Emma Gilson Wallace (September 2, 1841 – June 7, 1911) was an American philanthropist and leader of a charitable organization. She served as the 12th National President of the Woman's Relief Corps (WRC).

== Early life ==
Emma Rosela Gilson was born in La Moille, Illinois, on September 2, 1841, and died in Chicago, Illinois, on June 7, 1911.

She received a careful education and was at an early age interested in reform and charitable movements.

== Career ==
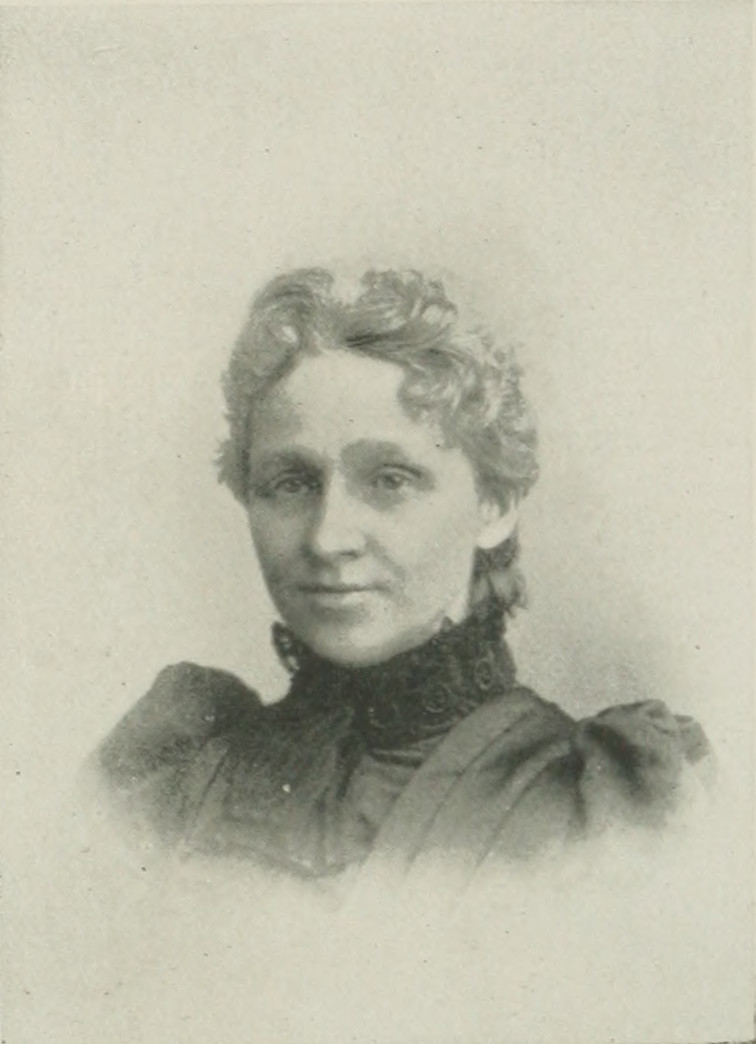
Photo portrait from, A Woman of the Century

Wallace was for years president of the Women's Universalist Association of Illinois, and the work accomplished under her leadership was of great importance to the denomination at large. She successfully managed church and charitable associations.

She was a member of the Chicago Press Club, the Chicago Woman's Club, the WRC, the Woman's Exchange, the Home of the Friendless, and many other similar organizations.

She was among the first to interest the public in a woman's department for the World's Columbian Exposition of 1893, and she was one of the lady managers of the exposition. She was president of the Illinois Industrial School for Girls, in Evanston, Illinois, and that institution owed much of its success to her.

== Personal life ==
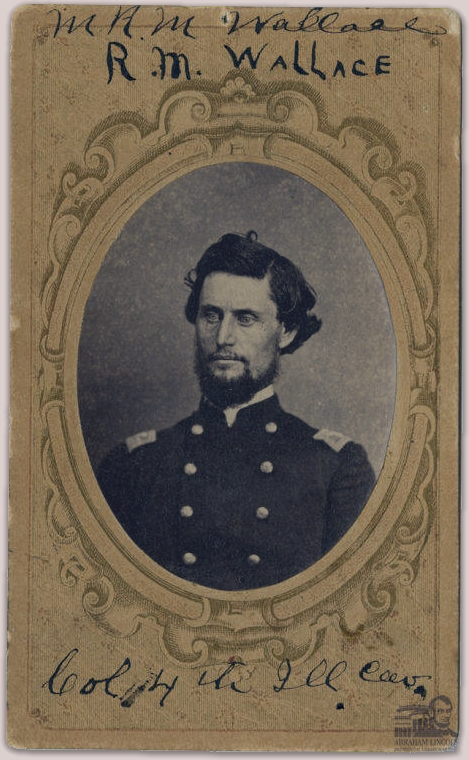
Martin R. M. Wallace

On September 2, 1863, Emma R. Gilson married Col. Martin Reuben Merritt Wallace (1829–1902), and their wedding tour took them to the South, where Colonel Wallace was stationed. They remained in the South until the war ended and then went to Chicago, Illinois.

They had 3 children: George William Ransom Wallace (1865–1944), Katherine E. Wallace (1866–1947), and Sarah Price Wallace Boyden (1868–1953).

They were members of St. Paul's Universalist Church, in that city, and Wallace was prominently identified with its interests.

She died on June 7, 1911, and is buried at Rosehill Cemetery, Chicago.
