= Lost Creek (Meramec River tributary) =

Stream in the U.S. state of Missouri

Lost Creek is a stream in Dent County in the U.S. state of Missouri. It is a tributary of the Meramec River.

The stream headwaters are at 37°42′59″N 91°30′50″W and the confluence with the Meramec is at 37°45′54″N 91°27′29″W.

Lost Creek was named for the fact it is a losing stream along part of its course.

== See also ==
- List of rivers of Missouri
