= Lisabeth H. Muhrer =

Norwegian handball player

Personal information
- Nationality: Norwegian

Sport
- Sport: Handball
National team
Years	Team	Apps	(Gls)
1971–1977	Norway	27	(27)

Lisabeth H. Muhrer is a Norwegian handball player. She played 27 matches for the Norwegian national team between 1971 and 1977. She participated at the 1975 World Women's Handball Championship, where the Norwegian team placed 8th.
