= Lost Creek (Kansas) =

Stream in Bourbon and Linn County, Kansas, U.S.

Coordinates: 38.017535°N 94.798296°W

Lost Creek is a stream in Bourbon and Linn counties, in the U.S. state of Kansas.

Lost Creek was named from the fact it is a losing stream in dry weather.

== See also ==
- List of rivers of Kansas
