= Lizabeth A. Turner =

American charitable organization leader

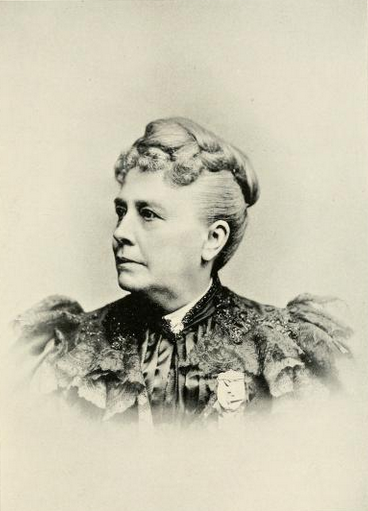
Lizabeth A. Turner

Lizabeth A. Turner (February 1, 1829 – April 27, 1907) was an American charitable organization leader who served as twelfth National President of the Woman's Relief Corps (WRC). Turner was involved in the Andersonville prison work, being chair of the board of managers of the National Reservation at Andersonville. She was also a model financier, and her service as a treasurer of large charitable enterprises was in great demand.

Turner was one of the founders of the Ladies' Aid Association of the Soldiers' Home in Chelsea, Massachusetts, auxiliary to the Board of Trustees, and she was a regular contributor to the home, which she often visited. She served continuously in some official capacity — as chair of large committees for fairs, Memorial Day and other special work, as a member of the Board of Directors, and as one of the Vice-Presidents. A room bearing her name was furnished by the Department of Massachusetts, WRC, and contained her portrait. Abraham Lincoln Corps of Charlestown, of which she was a member, placed her picture in Department headquarters, Boylston Building, Boston. She was deeply interested in all the posts of the Grand Army of the Republic (GAR), and had many friends among the comrades throughout the United States, for they appreciated her work in their behalf.

== Early life and education ==
Lizabeth Ann Thompson was born in Warehouse Point, Connecticut, February 1, 1829. Her parents were Charles and Betsey Thompson, of Windsor, Connecticut. One of her grandfathers, John Thompson, fought in the battle of Bunker Hill and the other at Valley Forge. This qualified her as was one of the Daughters of the American Revolution.

Turner was educated in the public schools of her native town.

== Georgia ==
In 1857, she married Finley L. Turner, of Georgia, and they moved to Augusta, Georgia. He died three years later, and was interred in the old cemetery at Portland, Maine. She was living in Portland, Maine at the time of her husband's death.

== Boston ==
=== 1860s ===
Turner removed to Boston before the start of the Civil War. For a number of years, she conducted a millinery establishment at No. 29 Temple Place.

At the start of the Civil War, Turner packed the first box of supplies forwarded from that city to the soldiers at the front, and in 1863, she was a constant visitor to the hospital in Pemberton Square, where the wounded sent from the battlefields of the South received care.

=== 1880s ===
She became a member of the WRC on March 17, 1880, and was initiated by E. Florence Barker, who was then President of Gen. H. G. Berry Corps of Malden, Massachusetts. Turner was subsequently associated with Barker as one of the pioneers of the National WRC.

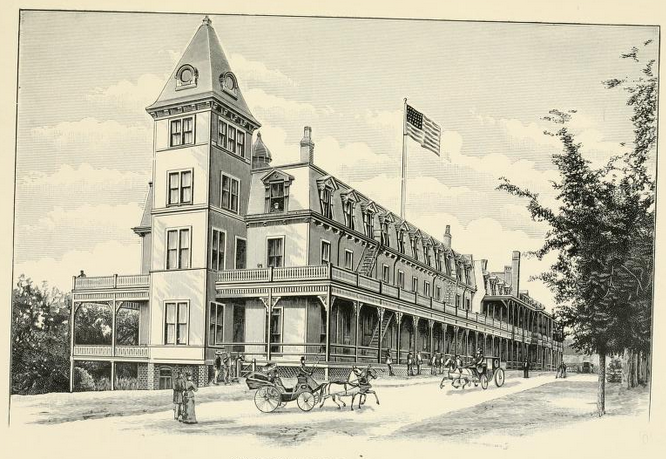
Soldiers' Home (Chelsea, Massachusetts; 1895)

The movement in behalf of a Soldiers' Home in Chelsea, Massachusetts enlisted her sympathies, and she was one of the leaders in the bazaar held for that object in Mechanics' Building, Boston, in December, 1881. One of the attractions of the bazaar was a military album, containing autographs of President Abraham Lincoln and the original war Cabinet, besides the signatures of prominent generals and other leaders in the civil conflict and in the Revolution. It netted US$1,000 to the fund, and was kept in the library of the Loyal Legion of Massachusetts. The autographs were collected and arranged by Turner.

Turner held various offices in the corps at Malden, and was its president two years. At the annual convention of the Department of Massachusetts, WRC, in 1883, she was elected to the office of Conductor. She was Junior Vice-President in 1884 and 1885, and Senior Vice-President in 1886–87. In 1888, she declined to accept the honor of Department President, but consented to serve as chair of the Executive Board. In 1892, after three years in this office, she was appointed Counsellor by Mary G. Deane, Department President. Turner addressed numerous posts, corps, conventions, and other patriotic gatherings in all parts of the State. She was especially popular as an installing officer and as a member of committees where executive ability was required.

In 1883, when the National WRC was organized at the National Encampment of the GAR in Denver, Colorado, Turner, who rendered invaluable service in securing the adoption of the Massachusetts work and ritual, was elected National Treasurer. She was re-elected seven years in succession, during which time she ably-managed the finances.

At the Massachusetts Department Convention in 1888, she was elected Conductor and in June of the same year, was chosen a delegate to Denver, where it was proposed to form a National Woman's Relief Corps. She was elected chair of the National Executive Board in 1889.

=== 1890s ===
In 1890, she was elected National Senior Vice-President when the convention was held in Tremont Temple, Boston. She was treasurer of the Executive Committee of Arrangements for this convention and chair of the Committee on Accommodations. The following year, Turner was invited to be a candidate for the office of National President, but declined.

In 1892, Turner was appointed Massachusetts Department Counselor by Mary G. Deane, Department President. At this Convention she proposed the erection of a monument in memory of the unknown dead, presenting the subject as follows:—"Ladies, I have something to bring before you that is a little out of the common course of convention work. All through the South, in almost every little town and hamlet in the States which were enrolled as Confederate, there are hundreds of little monuments erected to the dead. Some bear only the inscription Our Dead,' some the Unknown Dead, all erected to the men who never came back. Several say, “Our Dead, who never came back.' Shall the people of the South do more for their dead who never came back than Massachusetts? I have seen how money has been poured in for those who did come back; and now I want this Department of Massachusetts to erect a monument in some public place which shall bear the inscription, — Erected by the Woman's Relief Corps, in memory of the men who never came back. I would ask that a committee of one be appointed by this Convention to receive the amount each Corps is willing to pledge to such a monument, the committee to report at the next Convention. I think we can raise the amount necessary very easily. I am sure that the women who sent forth loved ones who did come back will give of the fullness of their hearts. The women whose loved ones sleep in unknown graves will surely give to the men who made it possible for us to live under one flag." Turner, who was appointed Committee on Monument, secured pledges for the same amounting to several hundred dollars. She hoped to have the proposed monument erected on Boston Common or in the Public Garden.

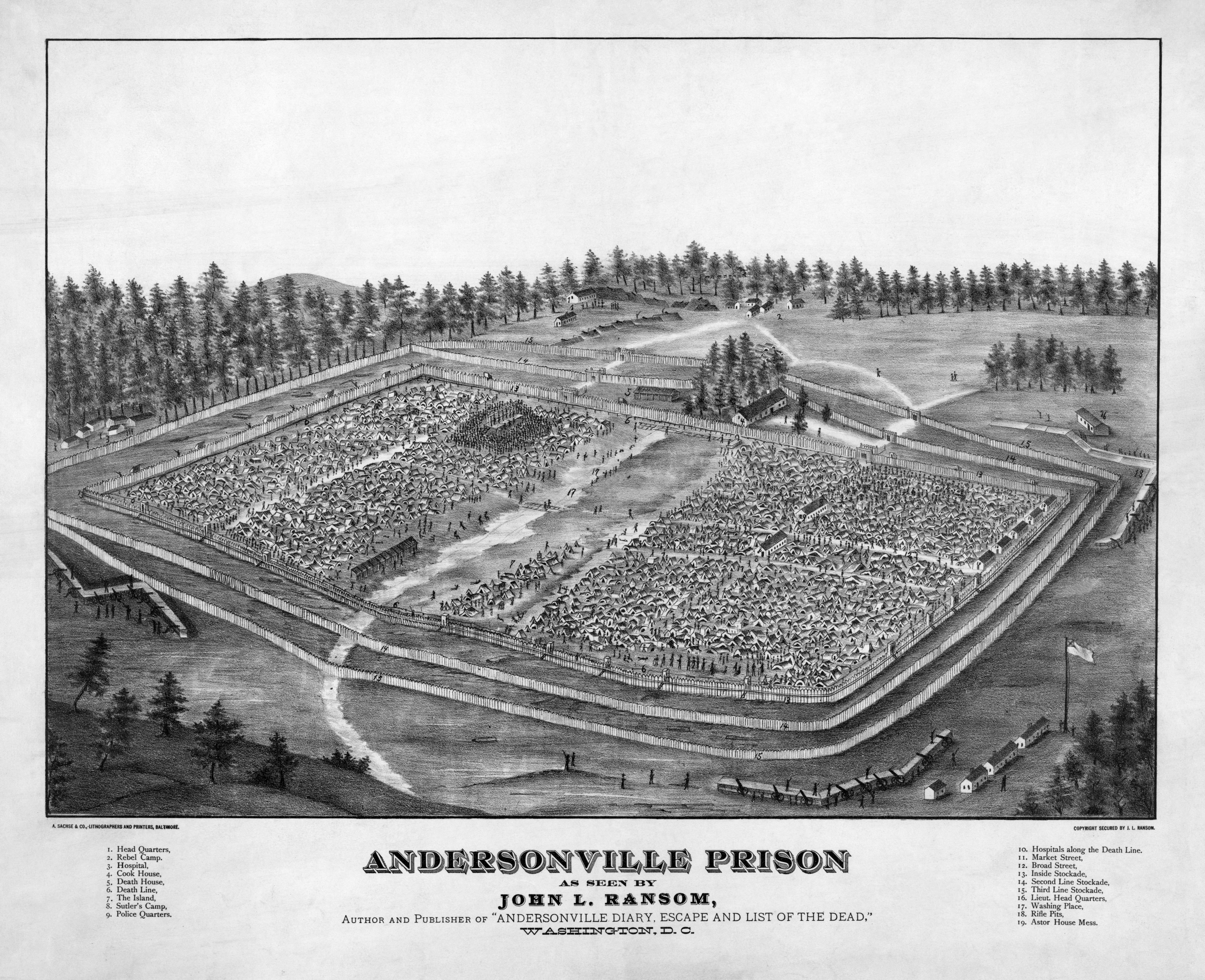
Andersonville Prison

She consented to be a candidate for the office of National President in 1895, and was unanimously elected that year at the convention in Louisville, Kentucky. She established headquarters at 29 Temple Place, Boston. The work of her administration met with universal approval. In the address which she presented to the annual convention at Saint Paul, Minnesota, over which she presided in 1896, referring to patriotic teaching, she said: "This is one of the fundamental laws of our order. In fact, it is one of the strongest planks in the Woman's Relief Corps platform. Our successful work along that line for the last four years has been even greater than the most enthusiastic workers ever anticipated." She made an extended Southern tour during her year as National President, visiting the African American corps, and also going to Andersonville, in order to find out something definite about the place and its surroundings. It being decided at this convention to assume control of the Andersonville Prison property, a board of directors was chosen, of which Turner was elected chairman. Two years later, in reporting the work accomplished, Turner said: "We now own all the stockade as well as all the earthworks and forts surrounding it. Suitable gates have been erected in all places needed except at the main entrance. A wide driveway has been cut around the grounds, just inside the fence, and wide gates erected at the northeast corner, that open out to a plantation road leading to the National Cemetery, one quarter of a mile away, where our heroes lie buried. Two bridges have been built over the creek, so that now one can drive the entire circuit of our land, two and three-fifths miles. The forts all remain intact, and are covered with a growth of fine forest trees. . . . We have built a nine-room house, at a cost of over US$1,700, and put up a wire fence with gates, at a cost of US$567; planted the prison pen with Bermuda grass roots at an expense of US$117; paid out in small sums, for extra help, tools, and sundries, about US$500 more; also paid salary of care-taker for seven months, and built two bridges." After referring to the presentation of a flagpole worth US$140 by Colony Corps and Comrades of Fitzgerald, Georgia, the gift of a flag from the Ex-prisoners of War Association of Connecticut, the furnishing in oak of the guest chamber at the cottage by members of corps in Massachusetts, and a donation of US$100 raised through the efforts of Emma R. Wallace, of Illinois, a member of the board, Turner stated that not one cent had been taken from the national treasury for all the work accomplished at Andersonville. She recommended that US$1,000 be donated from the general fund and placed in the Andersonville Prison Fund for the use of the board in completing the work mentioned in the report. Previous to the adoption of this recommendation, all the work had been conducted by voluntary contribution.

== Later life ==
In addition to her efforts for the improvements at Andersonville, Turner performed the duties of National Counsellor from September, 1900, to September, 1901. Turner entered into this work enthusiastically. In her report at the convention in Cleveland, Ohio, in September, 1901, she said:— "Within the last two years over two hundred pecan trees have been set out, and they are growing finely. The pecan industry of Georgia will be a close rival to the orange trade of Florida and, I believe, with better results, as we have no fear of frosts. I firmly believe the place can be made more than self-supporting by planting the ground with pecan trees. Ohio and Massachusetts will this fall put up handsome monuments of granite inside the stockade grounds, in honor of their loyal sons who died as prisoners of war. Pennsylvania has made an appropriation for a monument, and other States are agitating the matter. The most important work of the past year has been the erection of the pavilion over Providence Spring and its dedication."

In 1901, Turner retired from her business in Boston and removed to New Britain, Connecticut, to make her home with her niece, Mrs. George M. Parsons.

Turner was a member of the Executive Committee of Arrangements for the National Convention of the WRC in Boston, August 15–20, 1904, chair of the Badge Committee, also chair of the Accommodation Committee and a member of other conmiittees. Her recommendation that US$1,000 be appropriated annually for the perpetual care of the historic grounds at Andersonviile was adopted at this convention.

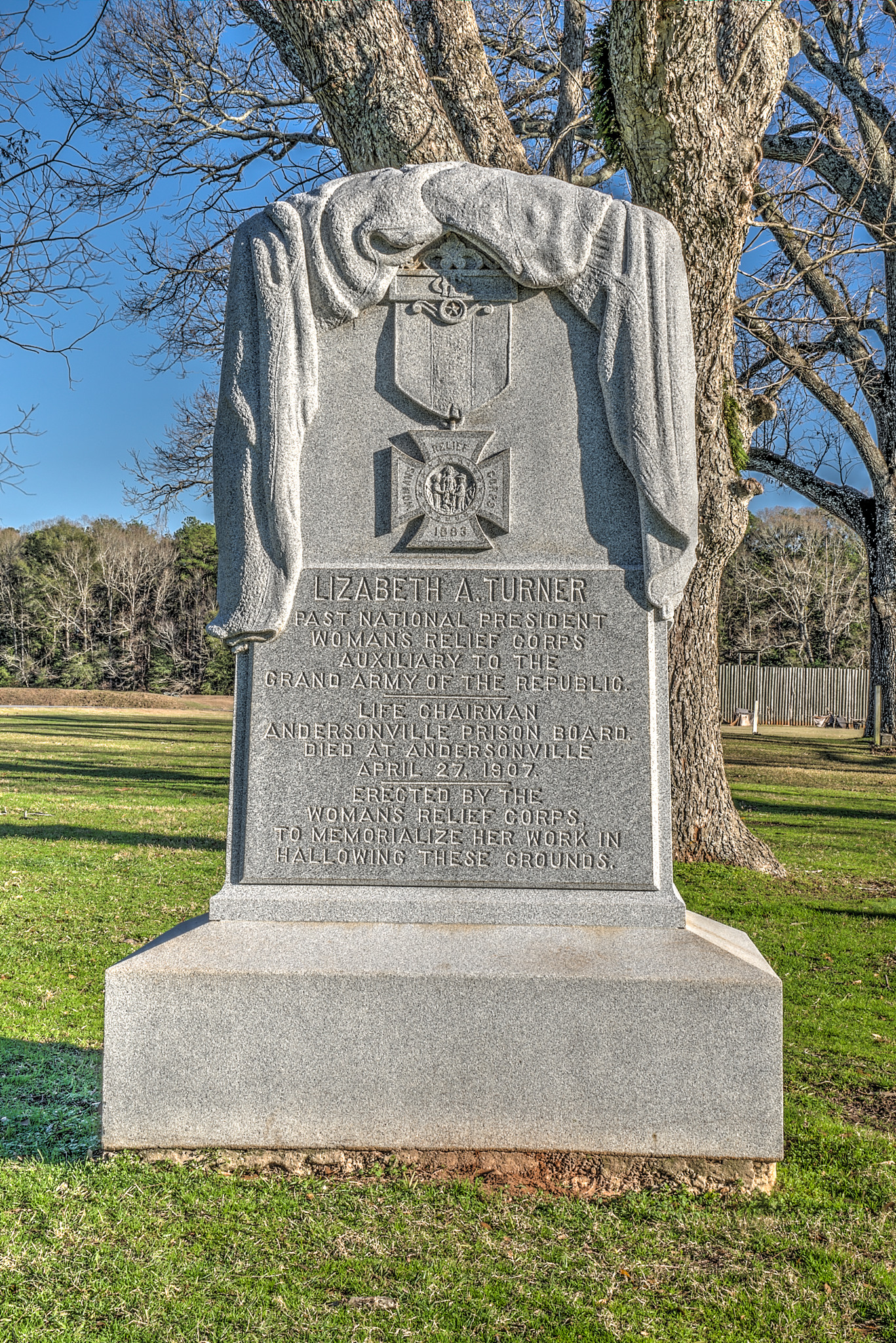
Memorial at Andersonville National Historic Site

== Death and legacy ==
Turner had been seriously ill since November 1906 but had recovered and hoped to further restore her health by a trip to Georgia. She left Connecticut on March 26, 1907, and died at Andersonville, Georgia, April 27, 1907. She left no children.

In 1908, the WRC erected a monument to Turner's memory at the Andersonville Prison Park.
