= E. Florence Barker =

American clubwoman (1840–1897)

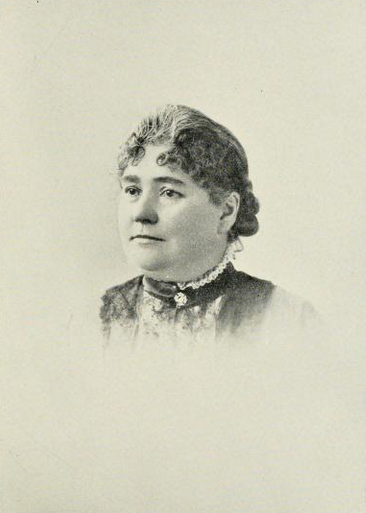
- Born: Elzina Florence Whittredge; March 29, 1840; Lynnfield, Massachusetts, U.S.
- Died: September 11, 1897 (aged 57); Malden, Massachusetts, U.S.
- Education: Thetford Academy
- Occupation: First president of the National Woman's Relief Corps
- Spouse: Thomas Erskine Barker (m. 1863; died 1896)
- Writing career
- Language: English
- Genre: Letters
- Subject: Woman's Relief Corps

E. Florence Barker (née, Whittredge; March 29, 1840 – September 11, 1897) was a leader and an activist in the American woman's club movement. She was a co-founder and charter member, of a charitable organization, serving as the first president of the National Woman's Relief Corps (WRC). Elected in July 1883, she understood the need to negotiate cooperation with the parent organization, the Grand Army of the Republic. Barker was an eloquent speaker, and wrote more than a thousand letters during her administration.

== Early years and education ==
E. Florence Whittredge (Note: Hamersly records Barker's first name as Elzina.) was born in Lynnfield, Massachusetts, on March 29, 1840. Her parents were William A. and Mary J. (Skinner) Whittredge. She was educated in the public school of Lynnfield and at Thetford Academy in Thetford, Vermont.

== Career ==
=== Pre-civil war ===
On June 18, 1863, she married Colonel Thomas Erskine Barker (1839-1896), of Gilmanton, New Hampshire, he being on a furlough, recovering from wounds received in the Battle of Chancellorsville during the Civil War. In July of the same year, Colonel Barker was able to resume command of his 12th New Hampshire Volunteer Infantry regiment. His wife joined him in August at Point Lookout, Maryland, and remained at the front until the following April. Her tent was nicely decorated, and was a cheerful rendezvous for the officers. This experience gained of camp life during wartime increased her regard for the Union soldiers, whom she so often met in camp and hospitals, for she was very patriotic.

=== Woman's Relief Corps ===
After the close of the war, Colonel and Mrs. Barker settled in Malden, Massachusetts. When the Grand Army of the Republic (G.A.R.) was formed, Mrs. Barker became deeply interested in its success. She joined Major-general H. G. Berry Relief Corps, auxiliary to Post No. 40, G. A. R., in May, 1879, and served as its President four years in succession. At the convention of the Department of Massachusetts W. R. C. in 1880, she was elected Department Senior Vice-President, and in 1881, was re-elected. She was chosen Department President the following year, and filled the office so acceptably that she was re-elected in 1883.

Eighteen corps were instituted during her administration. While presiding over the State convention in Boston, January, 1883, she welcomed Paul Vandervoort, of Omaha, Nebraska, Commander-in-chief of the G. A. R., and other prominent people. That the manner in which Barker reviewed the work and principles of the W. R. C. impressed Vandervoort with the value of such an auxiliary was witnessed when he officially promulgated in a general order dated February 16, 1883:— "The commander-in-chief is delighted to learn that the loyal women of the land are forming auxiliary societies everywhere. The grand work done by these organizations is worthy of the highest praise. The Woman's Relief Corps of Massachusetts is hereby particularly mentioned on account of its perfect organization and the work it has accomplished. The President of the same, Mrs. E. Florence Barker, of Maiden, Mass., will be happy to furnish information.

In general orders issued May 1, 1883, announcing the arrangements for the Seventeenth National Encampment, to be held in Denver, Colorado, July 24-28, Vandervoort cordially invited representatives of the W. R. C. and other societies working for the G. A. R. to meet at Denver and perfect a national organization, adding: "They should bring their rituals, rules, by-laws, and plans of organization, and if possible agree on a uniform mode or system of procedure throughout the country. I pledge the noble women who compose these societies that they will be warmly greeted and given all the encouragement possible. Clara Barton has promised to be present." At a meeting of the board of directors of the Department of Massachusetts, W. R. C, held in Boston, June 27, 1883, Barker, Sarah E. Fuller, and Lizabeth A. Turner were chosen delegates to represent this department at the convention in Denver. It was voted that the Department of New Hampshire be invited to unite with Massachusetts in sending delegates.

Barker presided over the deliberations of the women's convention at Denver, which was attended by delegates from several States. At the second day's session, it was voted to form a National Woman's Relief Corps on the same basis as that of the Department of Massachusetts, provided the National Encampment of the G. A. R. should decide to recognize this action. Several of the delegates present refused to endorse the clause in the rules and regulations admitting to membership other women than relations of soldiers. This clause also caused a lengthy discussion in the National Encampment when the resolution of endorsement was debated, for several comrades who believed in a woman's national organization opposed any movement in its behalf that would not restrict the membership to relations of soldiers. The convention voted to hold its annual sessions on the date and in the city chosen by the National Encampment, G. A. R., and then elected officers for the ensuing year, with Barker as president. An invitation was extended the women from Massachusetts to accompany the commander-in-chief's party on a trip through the Colorado cannons. This afforded an excellent opportunity for conference upon the work of the year, and the mutual interests of the two national organizations were considered by their leaders.

Through the approval of George S. Evans, Department Commander, national headquarters, W. R. C. were established at the headquarters of the Department of Massachusetts, G. A. R., in Pemberton Square, Boston. To prove that a national order was needed, that the plan adopted at Denver was the best, and that women were capable of managing a large organization with ritualistic forms of parliamentary rules, required excellent judgment, tact, and a love for the work. These qualities were combined in Barker, who sought advice from the officials of the G. A. R., and recognized the importance of harmonious co-operation with them. In her first general order, dated September 1, 1883, she said:— "While working in unison with the G. A. R., we can accomplish great results and build well the structure, which we hope will stand years after the watchful comrades have left —as they must— their unfinished work to our willing hands."

At the National Convention at Minneapolis in July, 1884, Barker said: "Our success far exceeds the high anticipations of our most sanguine friends." She wrote over a 1,000 letters during the year she served as National President, visited the Departments of Maine, New Hampshire, and Connecticut, and performed numerous other duties. She declined a re-election, but was made a life member of the National Executive Board, and until her death, was a leader in the affairs of the order. Barker was also an eloquent speaker, and she addressed many patriotic gatherings in different parts of the country. She represented the order at the International Council of Women held in Washington, D.C., in 1889, and favored progressive action when advocating the claims of woman's work for the veterans.

Barker kept valuable scrapbooks relating to the G.A.R. and W.R.C. and numerous autograph letters from distinguished friends in various parts of the country. When she retired from the office of President in 1884, her associates in the Department of Massachusetts presented to her a testimonial as a mark of appreciation and esteem, saying in part:— "The excellent judgment ever manifested during the two years in which you served this department as President, the fidelity with which you rendered service as first National President of the order, your influence, everywhere recognized, hare conferred honor upon our work, and aided in giving it a permanent endorsement by the Grand Army of the Republic throughout the land."

=== Other affiliations ===
Barker was deeply interested in the Soldiers' Home in Chelsea, Massachusetts, and was one of the founders of the Ladies' Aid Association which co-operated with the Board of Trustees, of which Colonel Barker was treasurer. A room at the home, furnished by the Department of Massachusetts W. R. C, contained her portrait, and was designated by a banner with the inscription, "Dedicated in honor of Mrs. E. Florence Barker, first National President of the Woman's Relief Corps."

She was one of the directors of the Union ex-Prisoners of War National Memorial Association, treasurer (and president one year) of the Woman's Club House Corporation of Boston, a trustee of the Malden Hospital, and a director of the Hospital Aid Association.

== Death ==
For nearly a quarter of a century, Barker was a resident of Malden, where she died September 11, 1897. Her death occurred less than a year after her husband's passing. Memorial services were held by corps throughout the country, posts of the G. A. R. joining in these tributes to her memory. Her portrait was placed in department headquarters in Boston. She was survived by two daughters and one son, namely, Florence, Blanche, and William E.

== Bibliography ==
- Hamersly, Lewis Randolph (1938). Who's who in New York City and State. L.R. Hamersly Company.
