= Lost Creek (Great Miami River tributary) =

Coordinates: 39°58′0″N 84°9′20″W

Lost Creek is a stream located entirely within Miami County, Ohio, United States. The 17.4-mile (28.0 km) long stream is a tributary of the Great Miami River.

According to tradition, Lost Creek was named for an Indian who was lost there.

== See also ==
- List of rivers of Ohio
