= Woman's Relief Corps =

American charitable organization

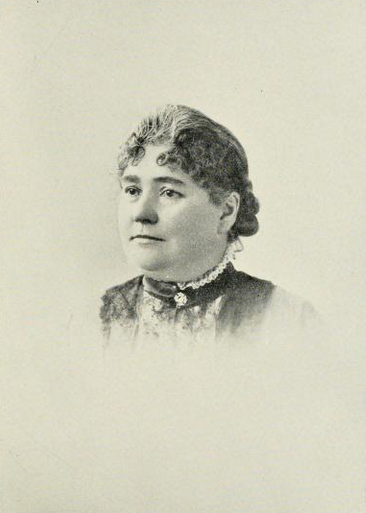
E. F. Barker, 1st National President

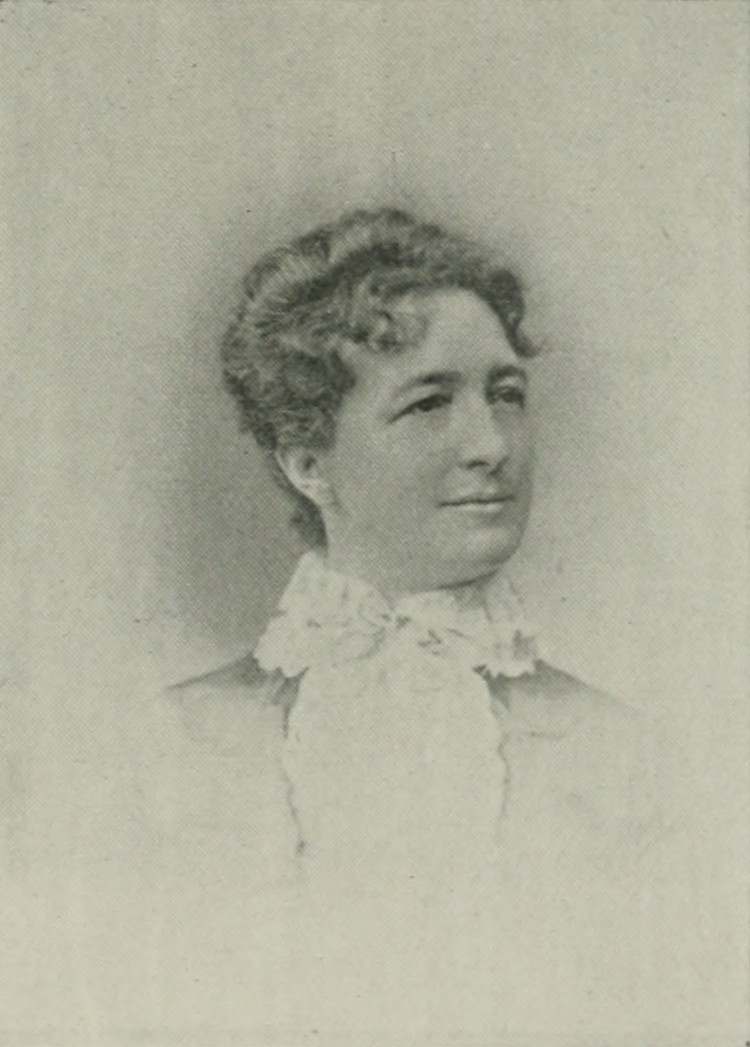
K. B. Sherwood, 2nd Natl. Pres.

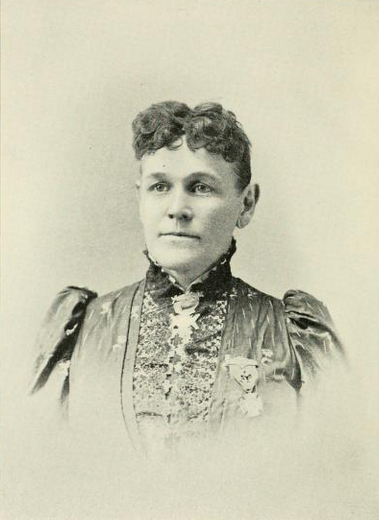
S. E. Fuller, 3rd Natl. Pres.

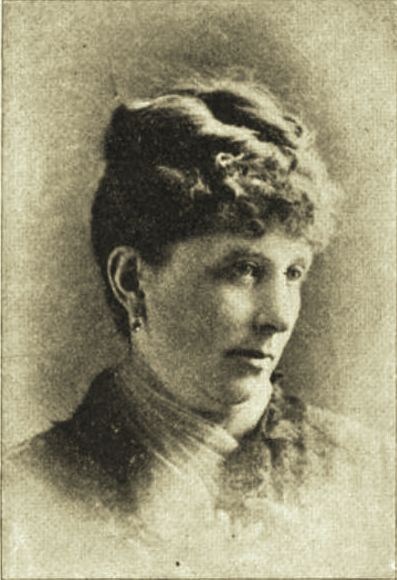
E. D. Kinne, 4th Natl. Pres.

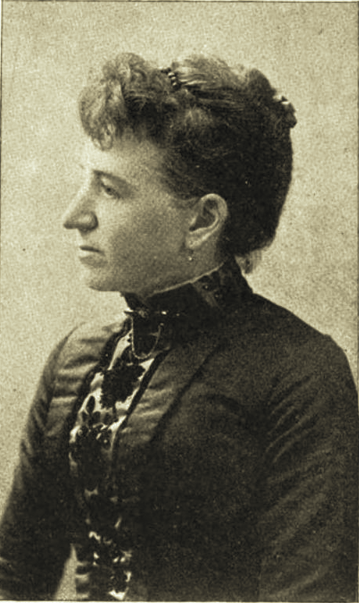
E. S. Hampton, 5th Natl. Pres.

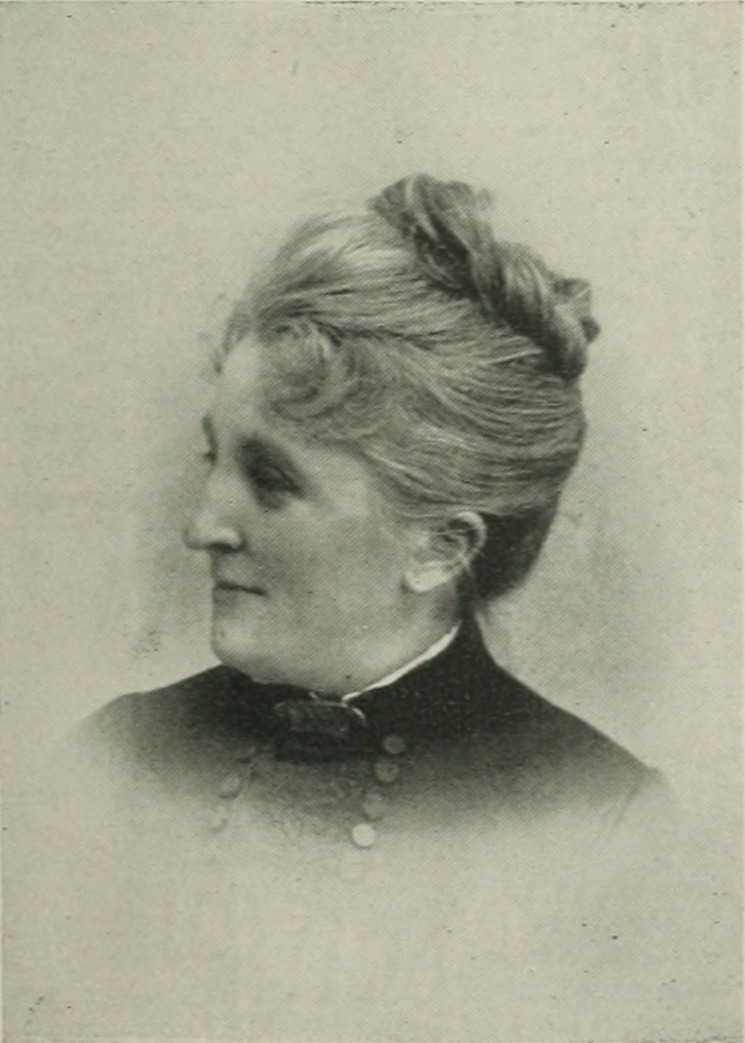
C. R. Craig, 6th Natl. Pres.

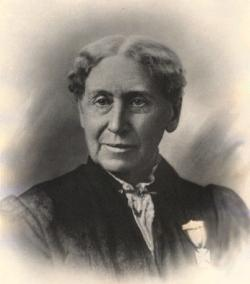
A. T. Wittenmyer, 7th Natl. Pres.

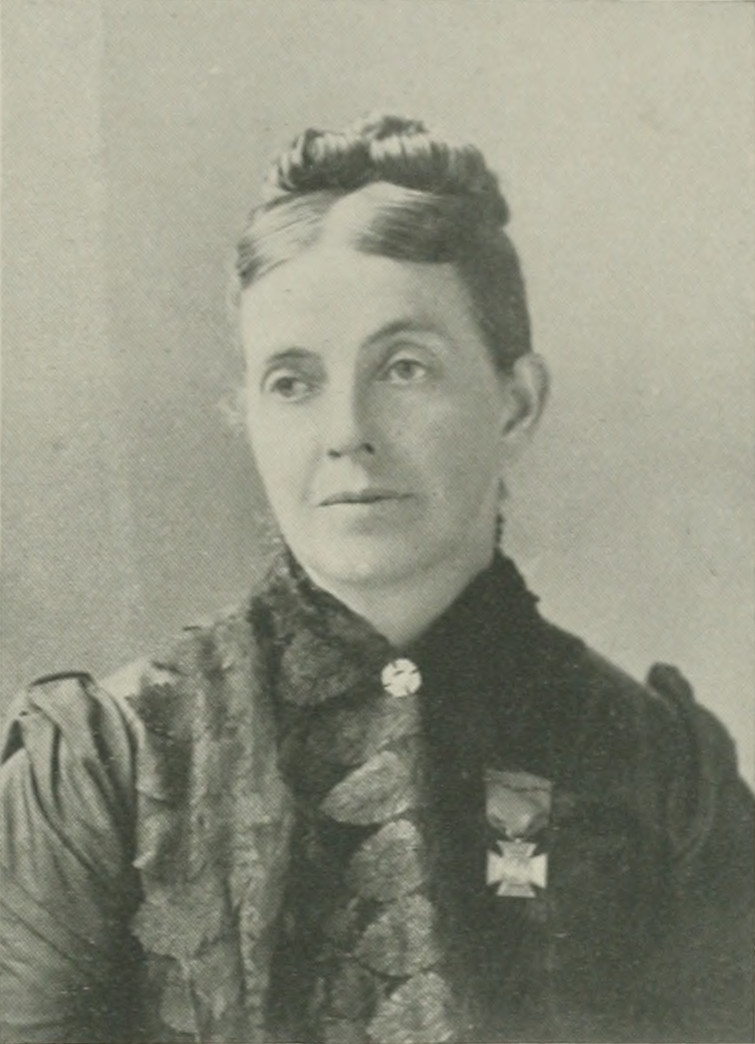
M. S. McHenry, 8th Natl. Pres.

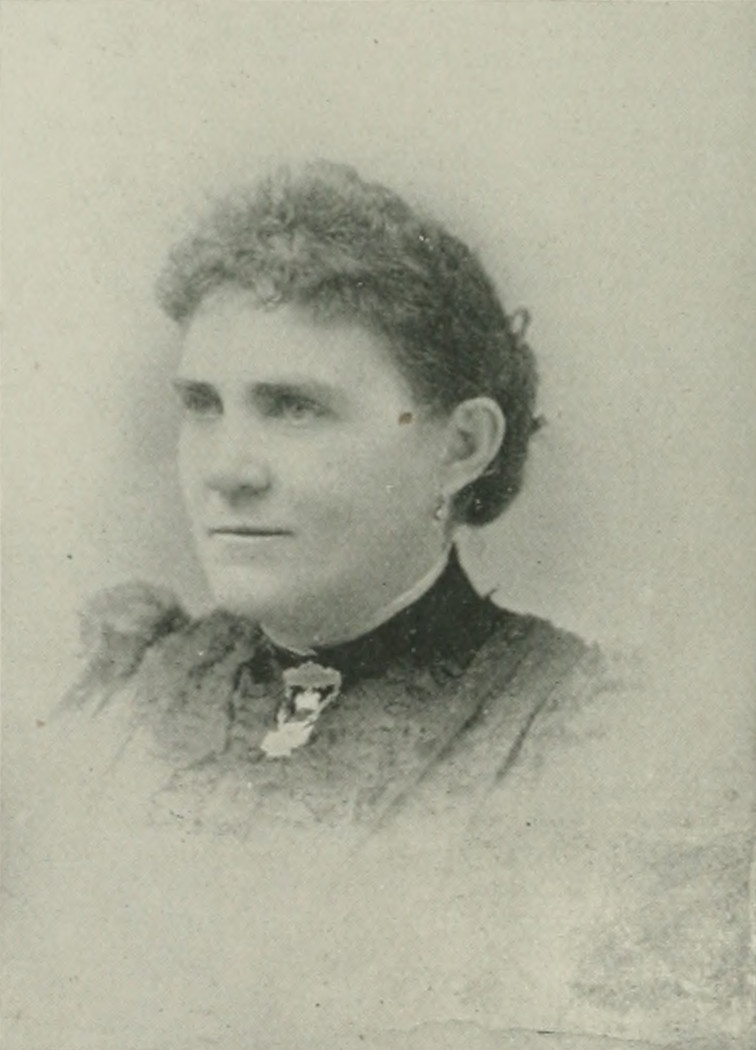
S. A. Sanders, 9th Natl. Pres.

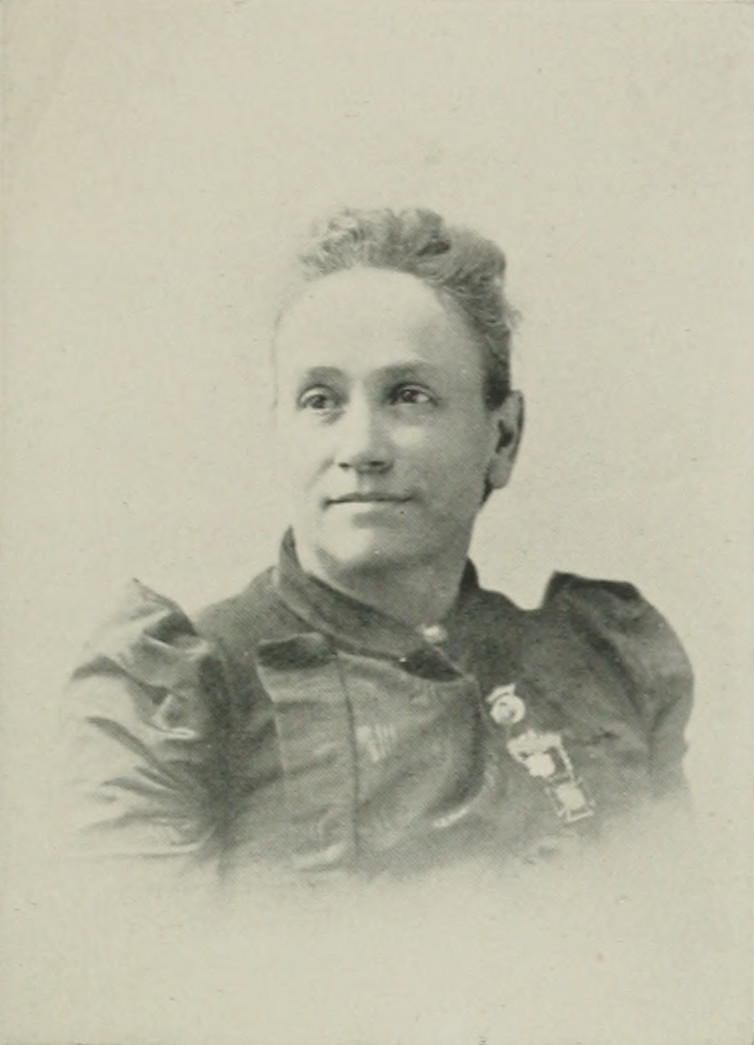
M. R. Wickens, 10th Natl. Pres.

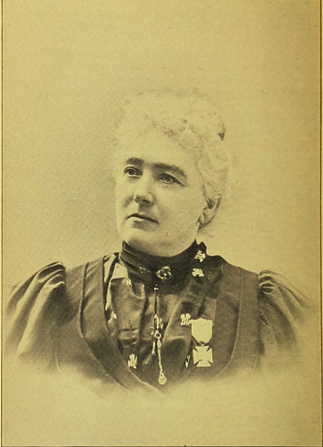
Sarah C. Mink, 11th Natl. Pres.

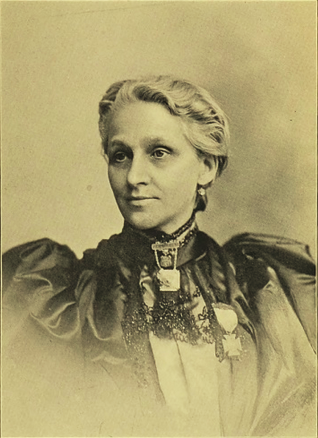
Emma Gilson Wallace, 12th Natl. Pres.

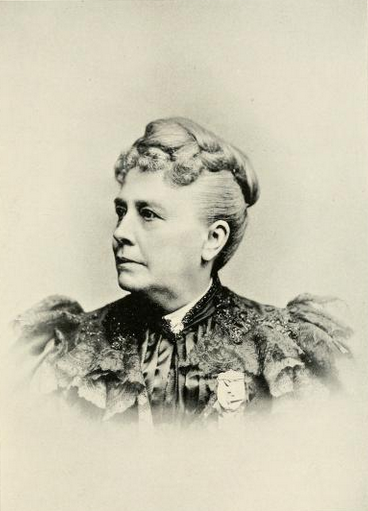
Lizabeth A. Turner, 13th Natl. Pres.

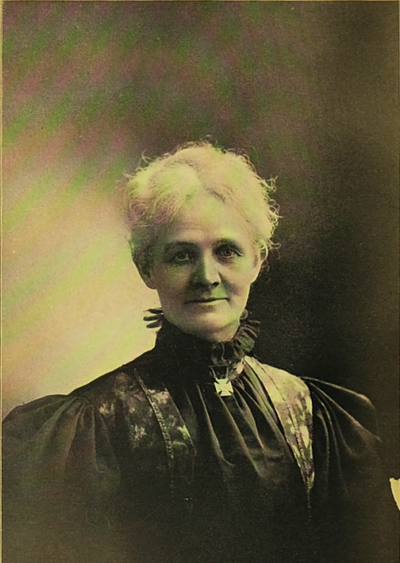
Agnes Hitt, 14th Natl. Pres.

The Woman's Relief Corps (WRC) is a charitable organization in the United States, originally founded as the official women's auxiliary to the Grand Army of the Republic (GAR) in 1883. The organization was designed to assist the GAR and provide post-war relief to Union veterans. The GAR had been created as a "fraternal" organization and refused to allow women to join up until the creation of this auxiliary. It is largely dedicated to historical preservation of research and official documentation related to the WRC and GAR.

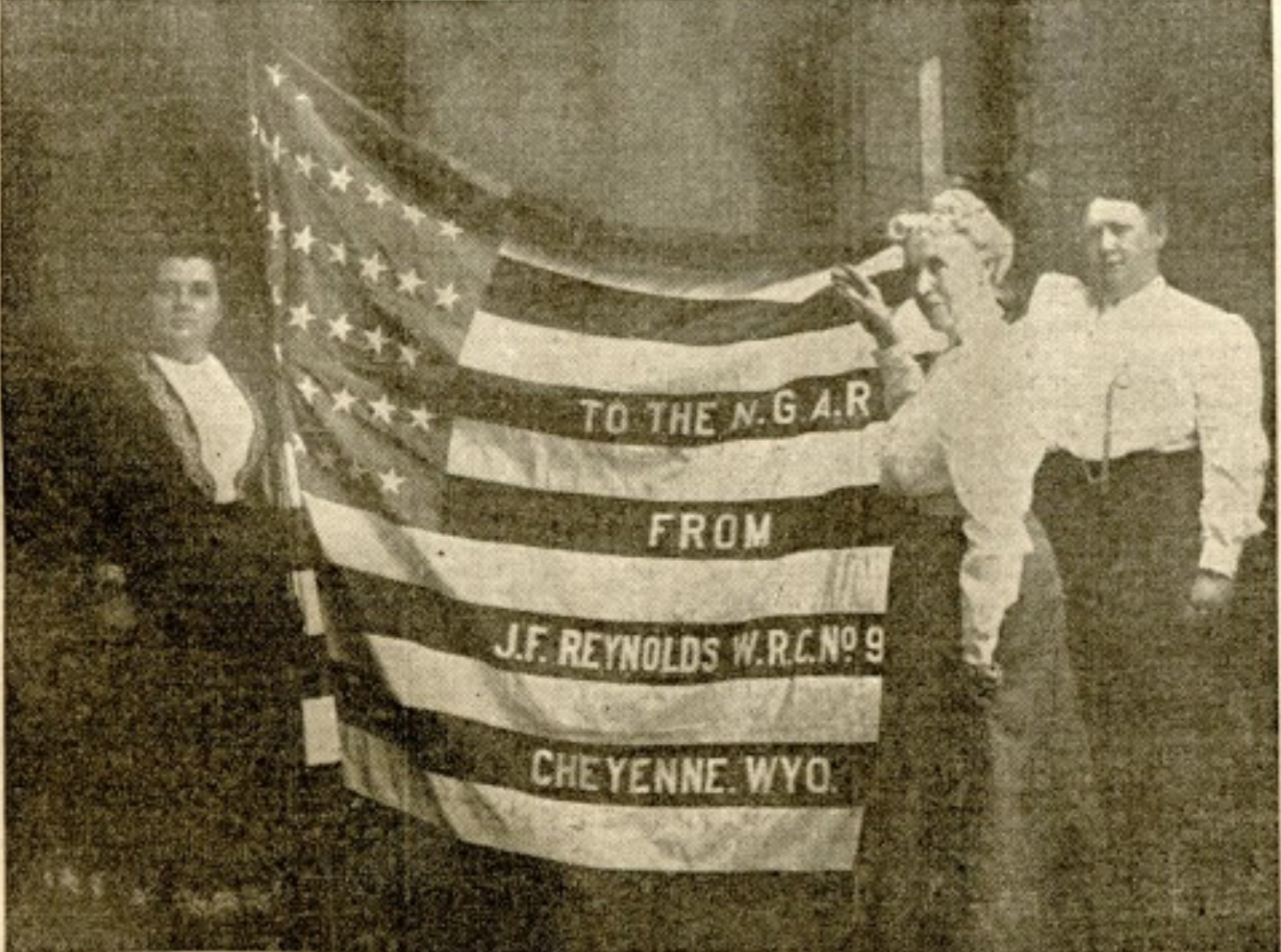
Cheyenne Chapter flag, 1905

== Background ==
The WRC expresses that among other tenets, a primary purpose is to perpetuate the memory of the Grand Army of the Republic, a veterans' advocacy organization for Union Army soldiers during the American Civil War. The WRC is the GAR's only legally recognized auxiliary and was organized at the specific request of the GAR. A formal Charter was drawn on July 25 and 26, 1883 in Denver, Colorado. It was subsequently incorporated by Public Act of the 87th Congress on September 7, 1962. The first elected National President of the organization was E. Florence Barker.

== Creation ==
As a result of women's roles in the war effort, they became equipped with the leadership and organizational skills that positioned them well for philanthropic organizations. They mobilized to provide aid to veterans and their families following the war. The creation of these local charities paved the basis for the origin of the WRC. From 1879, the primary criterion for eligibility to become a member of the WRC was loyalty to the Union cause, and membership was not necessarily restricted to residents of Union States.

The first chapter of the WRC began in Portland, Maine 10 years prior to the more notable one in Massachusetts. In 1879, a group of Massachusetts women from different associations started a "secret" organization that sought to more effectively unify the various local and state relief programs that had been loyal to the North during the American Civil War. In 1890, a chapter of the WRC was introduced in New Hampshire and it, along with the Massachusetts post, formed the Union Board of New England.

== Black Chapters ==
While most organizations prevented African Americans from joining, the WRC had numerous all black chapters in many urban cities across the country and various southern states also had detached black corps. Although the south kept their chapters segregated, the majority of the corps in the north were desegregated.

One notable African-American WRC member was Susie Taylor, who helped organize Corps 67 in Boston, Massachusetts in 1886, and over the next twelve years served as its secretary, treasurer, and president. Two other black women, Anna Hughes and Marilla Bradbury also held officer positions in the Martin Delaney Corps.

Julia Mason Layton, a black WRC member, fought for the 1893 National Convention decision that allocated funds to African American southern members so that they could be trained to more efficiently organize and finance black veterans. She also helped to create the first all-black chapter in the Department of Potomac. A notable member was Carrie H. Thomas, a black woman physician and educator, who also served as the official physician for the annual convention in 1915.

In Massachusetts, African American woman R. Adelaide Washington was elected as the president of the St. John Chambre Corps. Her election was incredibly impressive considering, at the time, this chapter was dominated by white members.

== Rules ==
Being the official auxiliary to the Grand Army of the Republic, the WRC could not just operate as it wished or do whatever it pleased. The founding members of the WRC had to write rules and regulations that the GAR would approve of and also ran along similar lines of what the GAR was doing. The Rules and Regulations for the Government of the Woman's Relief Corps stipulated three main objectives. The third of these objectives was to "maintain true allegiance to the United States of America" and teach patriotism and "love of country."

== State/Territory departments and post ==
The numbers of state and territory departments and posts changed regularly from year to year. In 1892, the WRC was made up of 45 departments, provisional departments, and detached corps of various territories and states. There was a combined total of 2,797 corps (chapters) across the country. In 1892, the WRC also had 98,209 members. Arizona, Florida, Georgia (U.S. state), Kansas, Kentucky, Maryland, New Mexico, New York (state), North Carolina, Pennsylvania, South Carolina, Tennessee, and Washington, D.C. all also had WRC posts, detached and attached, by 1916.

As desegregation of the state departments continued, members at the national level, such as president Abbie Addams, wanted to halt black corps from being created. She proposed this idea on the basis that black women were not educated enough nor interested in joining such an organization. She also wanted to investigate black chapters and dissolve them if they did not have proper permits or licenses to hold group meetings.

== Interdependence of the GAR and WRC ==
The WRC began as an auxiliary to the GAR, but as the GAR began to decline, the WRC was able to help promote the longevity of the republic. Because the GAR required members to be veterans of the Union, their numbers began to dwindle as generations passed. In New Jersey, the Ladies Loyal League was an auxiliary that was created by women who had evidence that they were related to Union veterans. This group never reached the same level of importance nor power of the WRC whose members were abundant and reputable. In the 20th century, the WRC gained a political foothold as it lobbied for feminist policies and pensions for Union nurses, as well as patriotic education.

== Memorial Day ==
Early on in the creation of the WRC, Memorial Day was used to teach patriotism and nationalism to children of all ages across the North (there was an effort in the South, but there was a great deal of resistance). The members of the Woman's Relief Corps with the assistance of children would make floral wreaths and place them alongside American Flags at the graves of Union veterans and nurses who died during and since the Civil War.

The members of the GAR and WRC viewed Memorial Day as a holy day, but by 1915, the organizations were combating the view that Memorial Day was now a holiday and the memory of the Civil War began to dwindle.

== Conventions ==
1. 1883, Denver: 13 states; 45 members
2. 1884, Minneapolis: 10,000 members
3. 1885, Portland, Maine: 22 departments, 23,000 members
4. 1886, San Francisco: 33,000 members
5. 1887, St. Louis, Missouri: 49,000 members
6. 1888, Columbus, Ohio: 63,000 members
7. 1889, Milwaukee, Wisconsin: 73,000 members
8. 1890, Boston, Massachusetts: 92,000 members
9. 1891, Detroit, Michigan: 100,000 members
10. 1892, Washington, D.C.
11. 1893, Indianapolis, Indiana

== Quotes ==
"For the women are much better at seeking out soldiers who are really in need of assistance than we are…A woman’s eyes are much quicker to perceive distress than a man’s." – Van Deer Voort, The National Tribune, December 21, 1882

“I cannot forget that our white soldiers, flying for their lives, were often glad to sleep in the beds, and share the coarse food of the loyal colored people. And I never knew or heard during all those terrible years of strife and blood, of a colored man, woman or child proving a traitor to the Union cause, or to the men who upheld it.......It seems to me that the question in the Woman’s Relief Corps should not be: whether a woman’s face is white or black, but whether her heart is white and loyal, and her life pure and generous.” Annie Wittenmyer Journal of the Eighth Annual Convention of the Woman's Relief Corps, Auxiliary to the Grand Army of the Republic, Boston, Massachusetts, August 13–14, 1890, 25–26.

"Although fifty-one corps were organized in Kentucky, they did not flourish as well as they might have, and in the course of time some disbanded, due to the fact that so many colored members met at the Department Convention with the white members. Although in entire sympathy with the Lincoln Proclamation, white women of the Southland do not associate so closely with the colored race, and thus the downward pathway was started." – Martha Francis Boyd, historian

== Notable people ==
=== National presidents ===
1. 1883–84, E. Florence Barker, Massachusetts (died Sept. 11, 1897)
2. 1884–85, Kate Brownlee Sherwood, Ohio (died Feb. 15, 1914)
3. 1885–86, Sarah E. Fuller, Massachusetts (died Dec. 15, 1913)
4. 1886–87, Elizabeth D'Arcy Kinne, California (died Jan. 7, 1918)
5. 1887–88, Emma Stark Hampton, Michigan (died Feb. 21, 1925)
6. 1888–89, Charity Rusk Craig, Wisconsin (died Nov. 11, 1913)
7. 1889–90, Annie Turner Wittenmyer, Pennsylvania (died Feb. 2, 1900)
8. 1890–91, Mary Sears McHenry, Iowa, (died July 26, 1912)
9. 1891–92, Sue A. Sanders, Illinois
10. 1892–93, Margaret Ray Wickens, Kansas (died Nov. 24, 1918)
11. 1893–94, Sarah C. Mink, New York (died Dec. 3, 1896)
12. 1894–95, Emma Gilson Wallace, Illinois (died June 7, 1911)
13. 1895–96, Lizabeth A. Turner, Massachusetts (died April 27, 1907)
14. 1896–97, Agnes Hitt, Indiana (died Sept. 8, 1919)
15. 1897–98, Sarah J. Martin, Missouri (died April 3, 1900)
16. 1898–99, Flo Jamison Miller, Illinoi
17. 1899–1900, Harriet J. Bodge, Connecticut (died Nov. 19, 1923)
18. 1900–1901, Mary Lord Carr, Colorado
19. 1901–1902, Calista Robinson Jones, Vermont (died Jan. 30, 1913)
20. 1902–1903, Lodusky J. Taylor, Minnesota (died March 15, 1923)
21. 1903–1904, Sarah D. Winans, Ohio (died June 4, 1915)
22. 1904–1905, Fanny E. Minot, New Hampshire (died May 2, 1919)
23. 1905–1906, Abbie Asenath Adams, California
24. 1906–1907, Carrie R. Sparklin, California
25. 1907–1908, Kate E. Jones, New York (died April 2, 1916)
26. 1908–1909, Mary L. Gilman, Massachusetts
27. 1909–1910, Jennie Iowa Berry
28. 1910–1911, Belle C. Harris, Kansas (died Sept. 21, 1924)
29. 1911–1912, Cora M. Davis, Oregon
30. 1912–1913, Geraldine E. Frisbie, California
31. 1913–1914, Ida S. McBride, Indiana
32. 1914–1915, Sarah E. Fulton, New York (died May 16, 1926)
33. 1915–1916, Carrie T. Alexander-Bahrenburg, Illinoi
34. 1916–1917, Ida K. Martin, Minnesota
35. 1917–1918, Lois M. Knauff, Ohio (died Nov. 8, 1921)
36. 1918–1919, Eliza Brown-Daggett, New York (died April 28, 1926)
37. 1919–1920, Abbie Lynch, Pennsylvania
38. 1920–1921, Inez Jamison Bender, Illinois
39. 1921–1922, Agnes H. Parker, Massachusetts
40. 1922–1923, Marie L. Basham, Iowa
41. 1923–1924, Bell W. Bliss, Wisconsin
42. 1924–1925, Grace B. Willard, California
43. 1925–1926, Catherine McBride Hoster, Indiana
44. 1926–1927, Edith Mason Christy, Ohi
45. 2016–2018, Michelle Colburn
46. 2019–2022, Jessica Harrocks
47. dishonorably discharged mid 2023
48. mid 2023-2025 Cher Petrovic

=== Other distinguished members ===
- Carrie Thomas Alexander-Bahrenberg, national secretary
- Isabel Worrell Ball
- Emma Eliza Bower
- Nettie Sanford Chapin
- Jennie Florella Holmes
- Mary E. Metzgar
- Della Whitney Norton
- Pauline O'Neill (suffrage leader), president of 2 Arizona corps
- Alice E. Heckler Peters
- Kate Pier
- Julia Rice Seney
- Susie King Taylor
- Mary Jewett Telford, charter member
- Mandana Coleman Thorp
- Laura Rosamond White
- Hannah Tyler Wilcox
- Hannah R. Cope Plimpton
