= Operation Migration =

Bird conservation organization (1994–2018)

- An Operation Migration ultralight leading five whooping cranes
- Formation: 1994
- Founders: Bill Lishman; Joe Duff
- Dissolved: 2018
- Type: Nonprofit
- Headquarters: Port Perry, Ontario; Buffalo, New York
- Region served: Eastern North America
- Chief executive officer: Joe Duff

Operation Migration was a nonprofit conservation organization, based in Ontario with a United States charity registered in Buffalo, New York, that used ultralight aircraft to teach migration routes to captive-raised birds. Its two Canadian founders, sculptor Bill Lishman and photographer Joe Duff, first conducted a guided migration of Canada geese in 1993, formally founding the organization in 1994. After experiments with geese and sandhill crane, Operation Migration became known for its work with the endangered whooping crane.

As a member of the Whooping Crane Eastern Partnership, Operation Migration led young whooping cranes from Wisconsin to Florida from 2001 to 2015, guiding 186 birds south to help establish a second migratory population of the species. In 2016 the United States Fish and Wildlife Service ended its support for aircraft-led releases after biologists concluded that human-reared cranes were failing to raise chicks in the wild. Operation Migration withdrew from the partnership and announced its dissolution in 2018.

Notably, Operation Migration handlers wore crane costumes who never spoke near the birds they hatched in captivity. These migrations flights inspired the film Fly Away Home, and the organization's Cosmos Phase II ultralight is now in the National Air and Space Museum collection.

== Background ==
An estimated 500 to 1,400 whooping cranes existed between 1860 and 1870. Habitat loss and unregulated hunting dwindled population numbers until, in 1941, only 21 remained in two flocks. One flock migrated between Canada and Texas and the other were a non-migratory flock in Louisiana which died out by 1949. All whooping cranes alive today descend from the Canada-Texas migratory flock.

With fears that disease or disaster could extinct the whooping crane, recovery plans called for at least one more migratory population to be established with experiments beginning in 1975. After large scale experiments in Idaho and Florida had not produced a second viable wild population, Operation Migration organized to continue the work of attempting to imprint a colony on a new flyway.

== History ==
=== Founding and early experiments ===
Lishman, a sculptor from Pickering, Ontario, who flew ultralight aircraft, got the idea of flying with birds in 1985, after reading about Bill Carrick, whose geese had followed his boat on Lake Scugog during the filming of the IMAX film Skyward. Using goslings that Carrick gave him the following year, he tried in 1986 and 1987 and first succeeded in having geese fly with his aircraft in 1988. William Sladen of the Airlie Center in Virginia and others then proposed adapting the technique to restore migration routes for endangered birds such as the trumpeter swan and the whooping crane, and Lishman began working with Duff, a photographer. Lishman later said his first flock, trained in 1986 to follow a motorcycle, would not switch to the aircraft; he found that playing a recording of the ultralight's engine to eggs before they hatched made the sound familiar to the birds. In 1993 Lishman and Duff conducted the first ultralight-led migration, taking 18 goslings 680 kilometers (420 mi) from Purple Hill, Ontario, to the Airlie Conference Center near Warrenton, Virginia. Sixteen survived the winter, and 13 returned to Ontario the next spring without assistance. Lishman and Duff set up Operation Migration in 1994; its aim was to have captive-reared birds learn a migration route by flying behind their Cosmos Phase II ultralight. The group was based in Ontario, and a United States affiliate, Operation Migration-USA, was registered as a 501(c)(3) charity with a Buffalo, New York, mailing address; its first tax return, for 2000, gave its purposes as developing technology for establishing safe migratory routes for waterfowl, for imprinting and raising birds, and for training personnel, and reported $157,477 in public support. Its unpaid officers were Lishman as president, Duff as chairman and Heather Ray as administrative director, with Deke Clark, George Archibald, Viive Tamm and Mark Woolgar on the board. It led another flock of geese that year, of which 35 of 38 completed the migration and 33 returned north, and more geese in 1995. Lishman's life inspired the Columbia Pictures film Fly Away Home, in which Lishman doubled for Jeff Daniels, flying his own original Easy Riser aircraft.

Experiments with cranes began in 1995, run with the Patuxent Wildlife Research Center of the U.S. Geological Survey, using sandhill cranes as surrogates for the endangered whooping crane. Operation Migration led sandhill cranes from Ontario to Virginia in 1997 and from Wisconsin to Florida in 2000. The 1997 flight, of eight sandhill cranes to the Airlie Center, left late in the season because of bad weather and mistakes in imprinting, and severe weather stretched the journey of a little under 600 miles (970 km) to 22 days. The following spring the cranes flew north in about 24 hours but ended up about 35 miles (56 km) west of their home base, and the flock then broke up; the team collected the birds and led them home by aircraft. The 2000 flight, a practice run for the planned whooping crane migrations, took 13 young sandhill cranes from Necedah National Wildlife Refuge in Wisconsin toward wintering grounds near Clearwater, Florida, led by three ultralights and a Cessna 182. One of its pilots was Deke Clark, a retired United Airlines Boeing 777 captain. A ground crew of eight vehicles followed the flock. The flight planned an overnight stop in Bourbonnais Township on the runway of cropduster Steve Benoit. Eleven of the 13 cranes completed the 1,800-kilometer (1,100 mi) flight, and nine returned north on their own the next spring; one bird that left the aircraft early joined a wild flock and migrated south and north with it. Experiments with trumpeter swans began in 1997, including a flight to Chesapeake Bay.

=== Whooping crane reintroduction ===
In 1999 nine government agencies and nonprofit organizations, Operation Migration among them, formed the Whooping Crane Eastern Partnership to bring migratory whooping cranes back to eastern North America, with the goal of a self-sustaining population of at least 120 birds and 30 breeding pairs by 2020. The partnership's members included the U.S. Fish and Wildlife Service, the International Crane Foundation, the National Fish and Wildlife Foundation and the Wisconsin Department of Natural Resources. The Canada–US whooping crane recovery team approved an ultralight-led reintroduction, with Necedah National Wildlife Refuge as the northern site. The new flock was designated a nonessential experimental population, treated as a threatened species, which gave its managers more flexibility.

The first cohort of 11 whooping cranes hatched at the Patuxent Wildlife Research Center in spring 2001 and was moved to Wisconsin that July for flight training; one bird died of stress-related capture myopathy in September. Eight birds began the migration, which left Necedah National Wildlife Refuge on October 17, 2001. Three ultralights and a Cessna 182 led the birds 1,218 miles (1,960 km) across Illinois, Indiana, Kentucky, Tennessee and Georgia to Chassahowitzka National Wildlife Refuge near Clearwater, Florida, arriving on December 3 after 48 days, 23 of them lost to bad weather. One bird died early in the flight after a storm let it out of its pen and it hit a power line; another, which the paper called a chronic truant, rode the whole way by truck. Seven birds were delivered to the wintering site, six of them having flown the route. The project's budget was $365,000, and it collected more than $27,000 in donations en route. Flight restrictions imposed after the September 11 attacks forced the team to detour around no-fly zones, lengthening the route. Former president Jimmy Carter and his wife Rosalynn watched the birds land in Marion County, Georgia, and more than 1,000 people gathered at a Crystal River shopping mall for the flyby on December 3. They were the first whooping cranes in a century to migrate across eastern North America.

Bobcats killed two of the seven birds. The other five left Florida on their own and returned to Wisconsin in spring 2002. International Crane Foundation staff had cared for them over the winter, and they arrived on April 19 after a ten-day migration. They flew straight across Indianapolis and Chicago rather than the dog-leg they had been led along, overshot about 80 miles (130 km) to the east, then turned at the right latitude and flew to where they had been raised. On their next southward migration the same birds flew the whole route unassisted in five days, overtaking the ultralight-led flock in Tennessee and reaching Florida first. Operation Migration led 17 more birds south in 2002; that migration took 49 days to cover about 1,200 miles (1,900 km), with roughly 35 hours in the air. By 2003 the flock numbered 21 birds, with 20 more planned that year; Lishman put the goal at a flock of 100. In 2006 a whooping crane hatched in the wild in the Midwest for the first time in more than a century.

An Operation Migration flyover with young whooping cranes

The flights continued every autumn. In 2007, for example, four pilots led 17 young cranes on a 1,228-mile (1,976 km) route to Florida's Gulf Coast, stopping again at the Benoit property in Kankakee County, Illinois. The whooping crane flights had used the Benoit airstrip since 2001, for at least eight years, before the route moved to Livingston County. In one year a cohort of 18 juveniles, trapped in their cages, died when a coastal storm surge struck. By November 2011 the reintroduced flock had grown to 104 birds, including 20 breeding pairs, against a goal of 125 self-sustaining birds with 25 breeding pairs. Duff called the goal obtainable but said reintroducing a species was not something done in a few years. Lishman had by then left the effort.

Juvenile whooping cranes foraging at Wheeler National Wildlife Refuge in Alabama

In December 2011 a Federal Aviation Administration (FAA) ruling halted the flight of the year's new flock of nine cranes in Franklin County, Alabama, about 693 miles (1,115 km) into a 1,285-mile (2,068 km) journey toward two Florida refuges, St. Marks and Chassahowitzka; Operation Migration grounded the birds voluntarily until it could legally continue. The FAA said that sport-pilot aircraft such as ultralights could not be flown commercially, and that paying the pilots made the flights commercial. Duff, the group's co-founder and chief executive officer, responded that its pilots were full-time employees paid for other duties and that the flying was volunteer work. After the birds had been held for nearly a month, the FAA granted a one-time exemption allowing the migration to continue.

=== End of aircraft-led releases and closure ===
In January 2016 the U.S. Fish and Wildlife Service announced that it would end its support for using ultralight aircraft to lead whooping cranes south, making the 2015–16 season's flights the last. Crane biologists had concluded that the aircraft and other human contact were harming the cranes, which service officials said had failed to produce chicks and raise them in the wild; a service official, Pete Fasbender, attributed the breeding failures to a lack of parenting skills. Of nearly 250 cranes released in Wisconsin since 2001, about 93 were alive in January 2016, but only 10 chicks hatched in the wild had survived to fledge, and since 2005 those chicks had come from only five pairs of adults. The reintroduction effort had cost more than $20 million. The International Crane Foundation supported the decision; Operation Migration opposed it, saying the program had helped the cranes survive.

Operation Migration continued releasing and monitoring cranes after its last flight in 2015. In August 2018 it announced that it would dissolve by the end of the year, withdrawing from the partnership. It said it no longer believed a self-sustaining eastern migratory population was achievable, and that it could not in good faith continue to accept contributions to carry out the Fish and Wildlife Service's new strategic plan. The Wisconsin Society for Ornithology read the statement as alluding in part to the service's decision to devote more resources to a non-migratory population in Louisiana, where juveniles had been released since 2011. Over its 15 years of aircraft-led migrations, the organization said, it had led 186 whooping cranes a total of 17,457 miles (28,094 km) and raised more than $10 million.

The eastern migratory population was estimated at 101 birds in September 2018 and numbered 81 in 2021.

== Methods ==
The technique relied on the fact that young cranes learn their migration route by following their parents, so captive-bred chicks had to be taught it by people. Chicks hatched in captivity were raised by workers in crane costumes, sometimes using crane puppets, who stayed silent around the birds so that they would remain wary of people instead of imprinting on them. The costume, which the team called a "crane burka", was a white bag that hid the handler completely, with a screen to see through. Handlers carried a puppet shaped like a crane's head and neck, with which the chicks were fed and taught to forage, and played recorded calls of adult cranes, so the birds never heard human voices. Stopover sites were chosen to keep the birds away from people. The pilots also wore crane costumes, and the aircraft was outfitted to look like a crane.

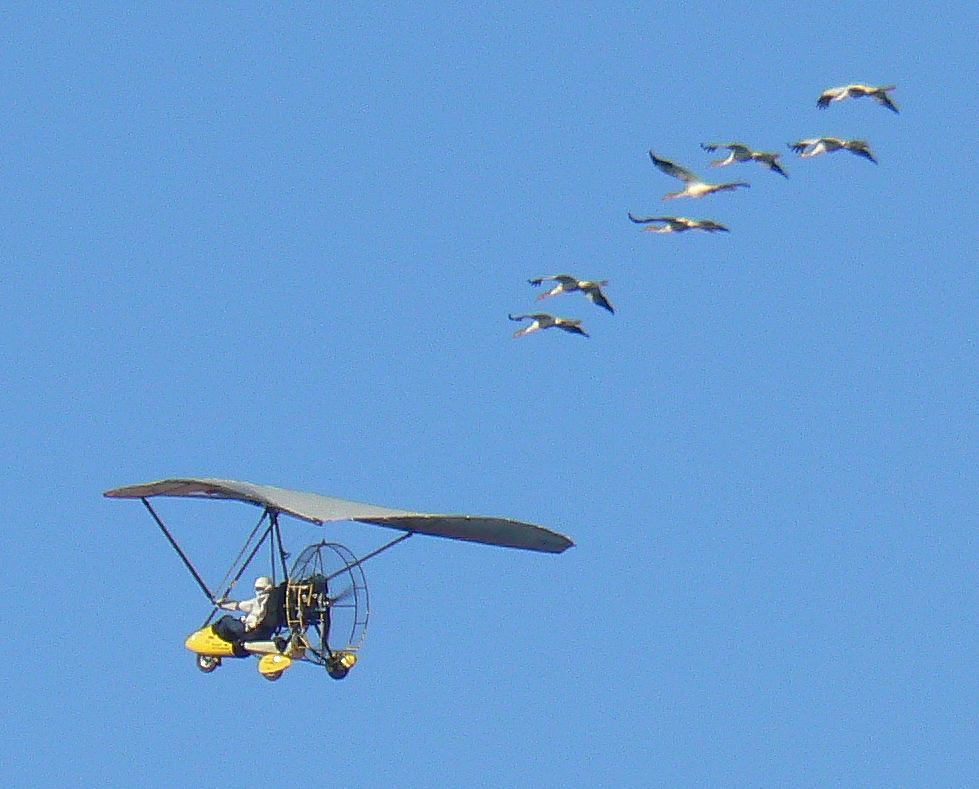
Young whooping cranes following an Operation Migration ultralight on their first migration from Wisconsin to Florida

Chicks could be reared at a propagation center and moved at fledging age to a training site at the route's northern end. At Necedah, in Wisconsin, they practiced flying behind the ultralight, with flights growing longer over the summer. The aircraft had to fly slowly, at 45 to 60 kilometers per hour (28 to 37 mph), for the birds to keep up over long distances. In good weather a single flight could extend to 100 kilometers (62 mi) or more. In autumn, the ultralights led each year's cohort south, with the birds penned at stopovers, some of them on private land where shelters had been prepared in advance. By 2005 a migration required a dozen people, two of whom flew Cessnas as "top cover", communicating with air traffic control and coordinating with the ground staff. By 2015 each year's 10 to 30 chicks were conditioned at White River Marsh Wildlife Area in Berlin, Wisconsin. From 2005 the partnership also used a second method, direct autumn release, in which costume-reared juveniles were released among cranes that had migrated before and learned the route by following them.

Birds that survived the winter returned north on their own the following spring, generally by a more direct route than the one they had been led along, and continued to migrate each year without assistance.

== Reception and legacy ==
John Christian of the U.S. Fish and Wildlife Service called the work "the wildlife equivalent of putting a man on the moon". Writing in 2003, Lishman, Duff and their collaborators judged the technique successful enough to recommend for other species whose young learn migration routes from their parents. They acknowledged that the efforts were still too limited to be certain that wild populations could be established this way. Reviewing Paul Johnsgard's Sandhill and Whooping Cranes: Ancient Voices over America's Wetlands (2011) in Great Plains Research, Janice Hughes noted that the book highlights what she called the astounding efforts and success of Operation Migration and the Whooping Crane Eastern Partnership in bringing a migratory flock back to the east. A 2011 article in the journal Environmental Law on the conservation of migratory species cited the program as showing how the learned component of migration matters for conservation. Reviewing Kathleen Kaska's 2012 biography of the Audubon biologist Robert Porter Allen in The Wilson Journal of Ornithology, Meredith Mann noted that Allen had opposed captive breeding but suggested he would have been cheered by the program's success.

Journalist Jon Mooallem traveled with Operation Migration for his 2013 book Wild Ones, one of three endangered-species recovery efforts he documented. He described a following of enthusiasts who called themselves "Craniacs"; kept away from the birds themselves, they followed the migration online and turned up at stopovers to buy T-shirts from the crew and hand them pies. One pilot told Mooallem that the project was really about people, with the birds as an excuse for doing something good. Darcy Courteau, reviewing the book in The Wilson Quarterly, found its story "terrifying" rather than reassuring. She grouped the parking lots full of Craniacs with other recovery efforts as manifestations of consumerism and of delusions of power and control, and pointed to the storm-surge deaths of the penned juveniles as an example of preservation efforts backfiring. In the Ecology Law Quarterly, Mae Manupipatpong used the book to argue that endangered-species funding should follow each species' relative ecological importance. She contended that the whooping crane stood out as a charismatic emblem of conservation in North America rather than for any special importance to other species, and that the Fish and Wildlife Service had not shown why the ecological roles of the crane and the Lange's metalmark butterfly warranted the nearly $3.75 million that federal agencies spent on them in 2013.

On the organization's closure, Duff said that educating people about the plight of endangered species such as the whooping crane was part of its legacy. Artist Pippin Frisbie-Calder, whose large woodcut prints deal with the ecology of Louisiana's swamps and cypress forests, referenced the project in her 2017 work Contemporary Heroes; a 2023 profile of the artist in Earth Island Journal described her work as mixing whimsy into religious iconography. Frisbie-Calder said the story pointed to a future in which people would have to take part in environmental restoration. The Cosmos Phase II ultralight, which also appeared in Fly Away Home, and a whooping crane costume used by the organization are in the collection of the National Air and Space Museum.

== See also ==
- Human-guided migration
