= Walnut (crane) =

White-naped crane (1981–2024)

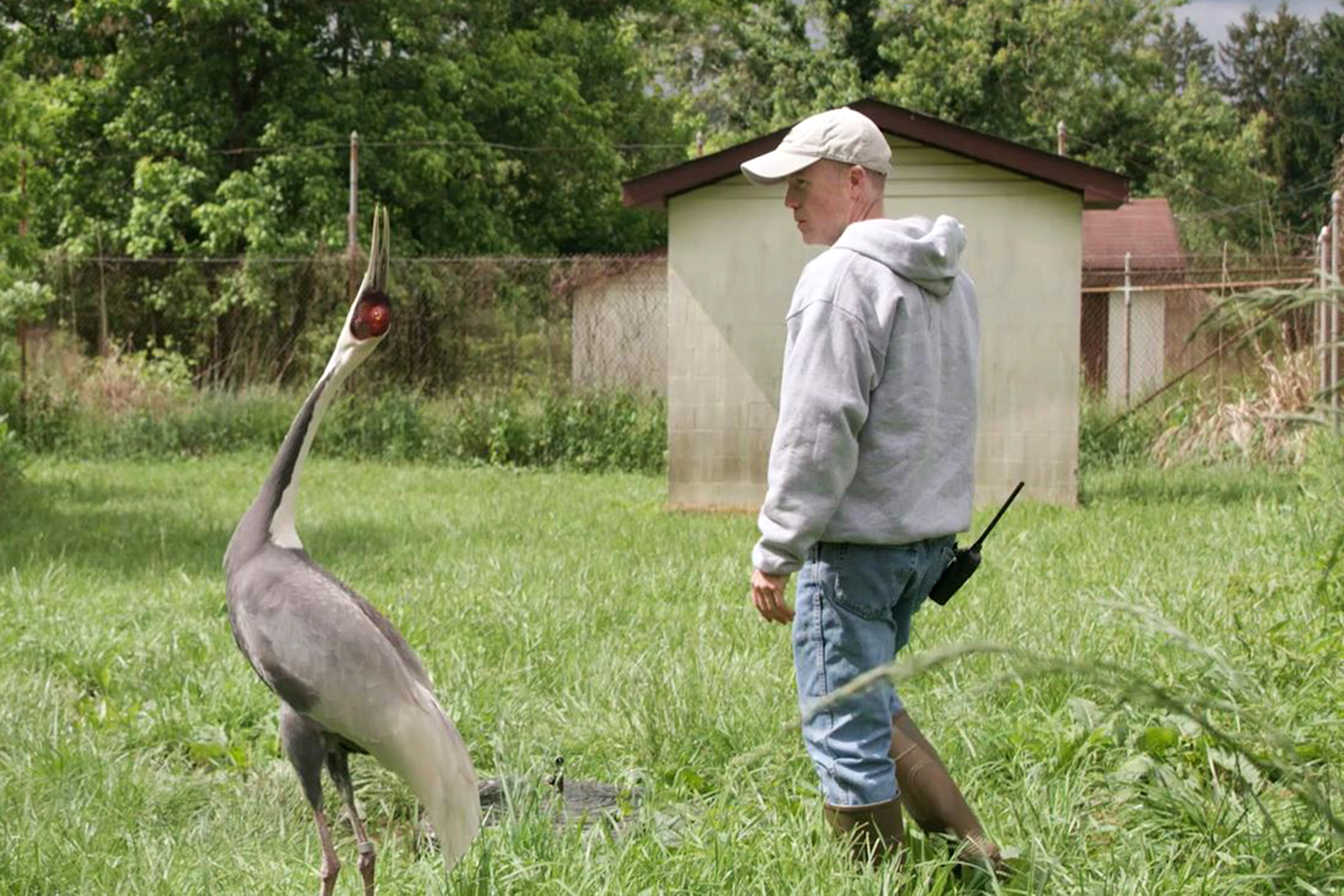
Walnut and her keeper, Chris Crowe (2021)

Walnut was a white-naped crane at Smithsonian Conservation Biology Institute, notable for her aggression towards other cranes as breeding partners, as well as for her two-decade-long relationship with her zookeeper Chris Crowe, who mimicked the bird's courtship display in order to bond with her with the goal of increasing the population of the endangered species.

== Life ==
=== Upbringing ===
Walnut hatched in captivity in the care of the International Crane Foundation in Baraboo, Wisconsin on July 2, 1981, to parents Mercury and Amazon, originally-wild cranes who were illegally captured and smuggled to Hong Kong. She was named by foundation volunteers after their preferred local dessert, a walnut cream pie. Due to breeding practices designed for maximum output, eggs were moved to incubators to prompt further egg-laying from parents. Ordinarily, newly-hatched cranes imprint on their parents, learning to recognise them and developing an attachment to them; however, without being surrounded by other birds of the same species, there is a risk that the hatchlings will imprint on a human, which makes them hard to reintroduce into the wild, and less likely to prefer same-species mates. While crane keepers were aware of these risks, the tendency of some chicks to kill their siblings meant that some hatchlings were isolated from others. ICF co-founder George W. Archibald theorised that Walnut may have been subjected to this isolation, and so may have imprinted on a volunteer. Walnut was transferred to Denver Zoo, and then Cincinnati Zoo, but due to her imprinting on humans, zookeepers were unable to find a suitable mate for her, with rumours suggesting she would attack and kill male cranes that attempted to bond with her.

=== Transfer to Smithsonian Conservation Biology Institute ===
In October of 2004, Walnut was transferred to SCBI in a last-ditch effort to get her to reproduce. Because of the wild origins of her parents, Walnut offered significant genetic diversity for the institute's captive population, which made her ideal for pairing with their other cranes. However, Walnut remained aggressive towards all potential mates, and so the institute decided to resort to artificial insemination, where the bird would be pinned down to be injected with crane semen. While this did work, with Walnut laying two fertilized eggs, the ordeal was very stressful for her.

=== Human bonding ===
In summer of 2005, SCBI zookeeper Chris Crowe observed that Walnut's greeting for him was similar to that of the other mated pairs of cranes, and so decided to participate in the courtship display in order to reciprocate her affection. This involved mimicking her mating dance; helping her to build a nest from grass, moss, straw and branches; and providing her with treats such as mice. Crowe noted that he was "a pretty lousy crane", commenting on his nest-building abilities that Walnut "never likes where I put [nest materials]", but noting that "she likes me anyway". Because of this bonding, Crowe was able to artificially inseminate Walnut without restraining her.

Walnut stayed bonded to Crowe for the remainder of her life, becoming mother to 8 chicks in total. However, due to concerns that Walnut would not recognise her chicks as cranes due to her imprinting on humans, all of her eggs were hatched and raised by other cranes in SCBI captivity.

== Death ==
On January 2nd 2024, zookeepers observed that Walnut was unwilling to eat or drink. Her health continued to decline, despite the dispensing of antibiotics and fluids, and she died of renal failure in the zoo's hospital shortly later. Her death was described as quick and peaceful by Crowe. At an age of 42, Walnut's lifespan was nearly triple the median life expectancy of a captive white-naped crane.

== Impact ==
Observing and bonding with Walnut helped SCBI contribute further scientific knowledge on crane behaviour, including courtship displays, vocalizations, breeding and parenting behaviours. Many of Walnut's offspring have matured and continued to reproduce, providing much needed genetic diversity to the captive white-naped crane population. As of 2024, two of the eight white-naped cranes in captivity at SCBI are descended from Walnut. Walnut's relationship with Crowe has been described as a "model of acceptance", and Crowe has been labeled "a feminist icon", although he preferred to describe the bond as a reminder of the importance of coexisting with nature. Walnut's story has inspired a children's book, which was praised for its illustrations and detailed information on the risks of animal imprinting on humans.
