= Austwell, Texas =

- City
- Interactive map of Austwell, Texas
- Coordinates: 28°23′25″N 96°50′37″W
- Country: United States
- State: Texas
- County: Refugio

Area
  - Total: 0.36 sq mi (0.94 km^{2})
  - Land: 0.36 sq mi (0.94 km^{2})
  - Water: 0 sq mi (0.00 km^{2})
- Elevation: 23 ft (7 m)

Population (2020)
  - Total: 118
  - Estimate (2021): 111
- Time zone: UTC-6 (Central (CST))
  - Summer (DST): UTC-5 (CDT)
- ZIP code: 77950
- Area code: 361
- FIPS code: 48-05036
- GNIS feature ID: 1329871
- Website: cityofaustwell.com

Austwell (/ˈɔːswɛl/ AW-swel) is a city in northeastern Refugio County, Texas, United States. As of the 2020 census, Austwell had a population of 118.

== History ==
Austwell was laid out in 1911. The city's name is an amalgamation of Austin and McDowell, the names of its founders Preston R. Austin and Jesse C. McDowell.

== Geography ==
Austwell is located at 28°23′25″N 96°50′37″W (28.390413, –96.843555).

Austwell is bordered on the north by Hynes Bay, an extension of San Antonio Bay. It is less than five miles from the mouth of the Guadalupe River.

According to the United States Census Bureau, the city has a total area of 0.4 sq mi (1.0 km^{2}), all land.

Approximately 8 miles (13 km) south of Austwell is the Aransas National Wildlife Refuge, an important preserve for the whooping crane.

=== Climate ===
The climate in this area is characterized by hot, humid summers and generally mild to cool winters. According to the Köppen Climate Classification system, Austwell has a humid subtropical climate, abbreviated "Cfa" on climate maps.

Climate data for Austwell, Texas (1991–2020 normals, extremes 1897, 2013–present)
Month	Jan	Feb	Mar	Apr	May	Jun	Jul	Aug	Sep	Oct	Nov	Dec	Year
Record high °F (°C)	87 (31)	86 (30)	89 (32)	95 (35)	95 (35)	103 (39)	99 (37)	102 (39)	97 (36)	94 (34)	88 (31)	82 (28)	103 (39)
Mean daily maximum °F (°C)	63.7 (17.6)	67.5 (19.7)	72.4 (22.4)	78.0 (25.6)	83.9 (28.8)	89.6 (32.0)	91.1 (32.8)	92.6 (33.7)	89.3 (31.8)	82.5 (28.1)	72.9 (22.7)	66.2 (19.0)	79.1 (26.2)
Daily mean °F (°C)	54.4 (12.4)	58.3 (14.6)	63.9 (17.7)	70.5 (21.4)	76.8 (24.9)	82.0 (27.8)	83.3 (28.5)	84.6 (29.2)	80.9 (27.2)	74.1 (23.4)	64.0 (17.8)	56.9 (13.8)	70.8 (21.6)
Mean daily minimum °F (°C)	45.1 (7.3)	49.0 (9.4)	55.4 (13.0)	62.9 (17.2)	69.6 (20.9)	74.4 (23.6)	75.5 (24.2)	76.5 (24.7)	72.5 (22.5)	65.7 (18.7)	55.1 (12.8)	47.6 (8.7)	62.4 (16.9)
Record low °F (°C)	22 (−6)	15 (−9)	29 (−2)	43 (6)	47 (8)	68 (20)	68 (20)	67 (19)	55 (13)	37 (3)	30 (−1)	19 (−7)	15 (−9)
Average precipitation inches (mm)	2.84 (72)	1.89 (48)	2.96 (75)	2.41 (61)	5.05 (128)	4.15 (105)	3.80 (97)	3.77 (96)	4.73 (120)	3.84 (98)	3.89 (99)	2.56 (65)	41.89 (1,064)
Source 1: NOAA
Source 2: National Weather Service

== Demographics ==
Historical population
Census	Pop.	Note	%±
1920	213		—
1930	233		9.4%
1940	301		29.2%
1950	228		−24.3%
1960	287		25.9%
1970	284		−1.0%
1980	280		−1.4%
1990	189		−32.5%
2000	192		1.6%
2010	147		−23.4%
2020	118		−19.7%
2021 (est.)	111		−5.9%
U.S. Decennial Census

=== 2020 census ===
As of the 2020 census, Austwell had a population of 118. The median age was 64.0 years. 12.7% of residents were under the age of 18 and 48.3% of residents were 65 years of age or older. For every 100 females there were 90.3 males, and for every 100 females age 18 and over there were 90.7 males age 18 and over.

0% of residents lived in urban areas, while 100.0% lived in rural areas.

There were 64 households in Austwell, of which 10.9% had children under the age of 18 living in them. Of all households, 46.9% were married-couple households, 28.1% were households with a male householder and no spouse or partner present, and 23.4% were households with a female householder and no spouse or partner present. About 31.2% of all households were made up of individuals and 25.0% had someone living alone who was 65 years of age or older.

There were 94 housing units, of which 31.9% were vacant. Among occupied housing units, 93.8% were owner-occupied and 6.3% were renter-occupied. The homeowner vacancy rate was 1.6% and the rental vacancy rate was <0.1%.

Racial composition as of the 2020 census
Race	Percent
White	79.7%
Black or African American	1.7%
American Indian and Alaska Native	0%
Asian	0%
Native Hawaiian and Other Pacific Islander	0%
Some other race	7.6%
Two or more races	11.0%
Hispanic or Latino (of any race)	41.5%

=== 2010 census ===
At the 2010 census, there were 147 people in 71 households, including 47 families, in the city. There were 126 housing units. The racial makeup of the city was 98.6 percent White, 0.0 percent African American, 0.7 percent from other races, and 0.7 percent from two or more races. Hispanic or Latino of any race were 44.9 percent of the population.

Of the 71 households 11.3 percent had children under the age of 18 living with them, 56.3 percent were married couples living together, 5.6 percent had a female householder with no husband present, 4.2 percent had a male householder with no wife present, and 33.8 percent were non-families. 32.4 percent of all households were made up of individuals, and 18.3 percent had someone living alone who was 65 or older. The average household size was 2.07 and the average family size was 2.57.

The age distribution was 10.9 percent under the age of 18, 12.1 percent under 20, 10.9 percent from 20 to 29, 6.1 percent from 30 to 39, 7.5 percent from 40 to 49, 20.4 percent from 50 to 59, 11.6 percent from 60 to 64, and 31.3 percent who were 65 or older. The median age was 58.3 years. For every 100 females, there were 96.0 males. For every 100 females age 18 and over, there were 89.9 males.

=== 2000 census ===
At the 2000 census there were 192 people in 88 households, including 60 families, in the city. The population density was 527.5 inhabitants per square mile (203.7/km^{2}). There were 134 housing units at an average density of 368.1 per square mile (142.1/km^{2}). The racial makeup of the city was 91.67% White, 1.56% African American, 6.77% from other races. Hispanic or Latino of any race were 57.29%.

Of the 88 households 21.6% had children under the age of 18 living with them, 55.7% were married couples living together, 11.4% had a female householder with no husband present, and 31.8% were non-families. 30.7% of households were one person and 14.8% were one person aged 65 or older. The average household size was 2.18 and the average family size was 2.72.

The age distribution was 19.3% under the age of 18, 4.7% from 18 to 24, 21.4% from 25 to 44, 30.7% from 45 to 64, and 24.0% 65 or older. The median age was 49 years. For every 100 females, there were 97.9 males. For every 100 females age 18 and over, there were 98.7 males.

The median household income was $23,750 and the median family income was $20,000. Males had a median income of $37,917 versus $21,250 for females. The per capita income for the city was $19,146. About 32.0% of families and 33.5% of the population were below the poverty line, including 44.4% of those under the age of eighteen and 33.3% of those sixty five or over.
