= Robert Porter Allen =

American ornithologist and environmentalist

- Born: Robert Porter Allen; April 24, 1905
- Died: June 28, 1963 (aged 58)

Robert Porter Allen (24 April 1905 in South Williamsport, Pennsylvania – 28 June 1963) was an American ornithologist and environmentalist. He achieved worldwide attention for his rescue operations of the whooping crane (Grus Americana) in the 1940s and 1950s. Allen helped save the roseate spoonbill from extinction. In response to the National Audubon Society's request he moved to Tavernier, Florida, and set up a tent on Bottle Key in the Florida Bay in 1938 so that he could observe the nesting Spoonbills up close. His observations led to the spoonbills' protection from human predation.

== Conservation efforts ==
Allen was a pioneer in early field biology and led large conservation efforts around the world to save the whooping crane (Grus americana), roseate spoonbill (Platalea ajaja), and the flamingo (Phoenicopterus ruber). Allen joined the Junior Audubon Club at a young age, and this is where his passion for birds began. He attended Lafayette College to study ornithology for a short period of time, but quickly lost interest. He secured a librarian job at Audubon, and soon became one of the youngest Audubon sanctuary directors ever appointed. Allen had a very specific approach to restoring endangered populations, and felt that widespread cooperation was necessary for success. Allen would first conduct extensive field research and documentation on the bird before any interaction. He would then publish and sell his research and include many illustrations and pictures for easy understanding. Allen would also capture endangered wild birds and exhibit them locally in order to raise awareness and raise money for habitat restoration. Allen fought for legislation to protect endangered species. He Helped bring awareness to all three birds, helped protect and zone off their breeding grounds, and helped generate funds from wealth families and the federal government for habitat restoration. Allen and others even flew ultra light planes to guide migratory birds to their nesting grounds.

Allen began working with the whooping crane in 1946; he wanted to learn what was causing the population to decline. He noticed that the whooping cranes were not returning after plume hunting in large numbers like other birds. He began studying the whooping crane at the Aransas Refuge in Texas. He photographed and drew detailed pictures of the wild whooping crane. He studied and documented the nesting habits of the whooping crane. He also studied and photographed the various marine life and vegetation that the birds eat. He discovered that the whooping crane migrates to Aransas Refuge during the winter, because of viable food sources and mild climate. All of Allen's fieldwork was carried out with the intention of learning the ideal conditions for whooping crane reproduction. He hoped to replicate these conditions for whooping cranes in captivity, and use the knowledge to help the remaining whooping cranes to survive. The whooping crane was a bird almost driven to extinction by early Americans and their hunting habits. Allen discovered that unlike the flamingos the whooping crane can reproduce in small numbers and live a long time. This made conservation efforts much easier, once a large group was established in protected areas.

Later, Allen began three years of fieldwork in the Caribbean, and his studies focused on the entire range of the American flamingo (Phoenicopterus ruber). He was working for the Society for the Protection of the Flamingo. The organization studied flamingos and brought flamingos to the New Providence Island in order to spark public interest in flamingos, and to generate donations to the foundation. Allen discovered that flamingos work and function better in large communities, the larger the group the better. This evidence proves that the flamingos are low on the evolutionary scale, and their breeding practices are complicated and can confuse the birds. When Allen first began following the pack of flamingos, the average flock size was 24 birds. Allen discovered that flamingos, unlike other birds, need over three hundred individuals to successfully carry out the mating ritual. It is reasonable to believe that the original number of flamingos was around 95,000 in 1600 A.D. In 1955 Allen estimated the population total to be 21,500, 80 percent less than their original number. Allen discovered that even the smallest of things could disrupt the flamingos' reproductive cycle. Gunshots, planes flying overhead, hurricanes, flooding, damming and diking bodies of water all caused the population to decline. On the island of San Lucar many people stole the eggs from flamingos for food; this could stunt the growth of a colony of flamingos for up to three decades. Allen's studies show that the same number of flamingos produced each year is equal to the number that dies off.

Allen took interest in the roseate spoonbill because he felt that the U.S. government was ignoring the low population numbers. Allen wanted to secure federal funding for the roseate spoonbill, and wanted Florida Bay to be included in the Everglades National Park. Roseate spoonbills were not seen from 1865 to 1890 due to over hunting; they were very close to extinct. When Allen began studying the roseate spoonbill there were only eight nesting locations in the U.S. Allen believed that public education on endangered species of birds was fundamental in fully restoring the population.

Allen found that plumage hunting depleted the populations of roseate spoonbills, flamingos, and whooping cranes. Allen deducted that over hunting not only reduced the overall population of these birds, but it made them vulnerable to a whole new host of things. Once the populations were decreased the birds could no longer defend themselves from certain predators, or reproduce properly.

Allen had great success growing the population of whooping cranes. The population was at 15 when Allen began his work in 1941, and the population is around 500 in 2010. Allen gained national popularity and news coverage when he spent eight years looking for the last remain nesting site for whooping cranes. Allen concluded that overdevelopment; habitat loss and unregulated hunting were the main causes for low numbers of whooping cranes, roseate spoonbills, and flamingos. Allen changed the ways Americans thought about wildlife through education programs. in 1973 his efforts ultimately lead to the passage of the Endangered Species Act.

== External References ==
- University of South Florida Libraries: Robert Porter Allen - Savior of the Whooping Crane
- University of South Florida Libraries: Robert Porter Allen Collection Manuscripts, notes, and photographs from Robert Porter Allen's work as an ornithologist and conservation activist
- University of South Florida Libraries: Robert Porter Allen - North American Wading Birds
