= Gladys O'Connor =

British-Canadian actress (1903–2012)

- Gladys O'Connor in Billy Madison (1995)
- Born: 28 November 1903; London, England
- Died: 21 February 2012 (aged 108); Toronto, Ontario, Canada
- Occupation: Actress
- Years active: 1986–1998

Gladys O'Connor (28 November 1903 – 21 February 2012) was a British-born Canadian character actress. Born in London, O'Connor moved with her family to Hamilton, Ontario, Canada in 1912, eventually settling in Toronto.

After several decades as a businesswoman, O'Connor pursued an acting career in the 1980s, appearing in films such as Police Academy 3: Back in Training (1986), Billy Madison (1995), Fly Away Home (1996), Harriet the Spy (1996), The Long Kiss Goodnight (1996), and Half Baked (1998). O'Connor's last role was in 1998.

== Early life ==
Born in London, England on 28 November 1903, she and her family moved to Canada when she was nine. Before becoming an actress, she worked as a saleswoman, accountant and bookkeeper.

== Career ==
O'Connor began acting in American television series and films in the middle of the 1980s. Her first appearance was in Police Academy 3: Back in Training in 1986. Some of her other credits are Stepping Out, Harriet the Spy, Billy Madison, Matrix, and The Long Kiss Goodnight.

O'Connor played a cranky but kind farm woman in Fly Away Home (1996). Her last role came in 1998 when she played Mavis in the television movie The Garbage Picking Field Goal Kicking Philadelphia Phenomenon.

== Death ==
O'Connor died in Toronto on 21 February 2012, at the age of 108.

== Filmography ==
=== Film ===
Year	Title	Role	Notes
1986	Police Academy 3: Back in Training	Woman at Phone Booth	
1987	Oklahoma Smugglers	Blanche	
1991	White Light	Old Lady	
1991	Stepping Out	Patient #2	
1995	Billy Madison	Tour Guide	
1996	Harriet the Spy	Woman with Purse	
1996	Fly Away Home	Farm Woman	
1996	The Long Kiss Goodnight	Alice	
1997	Critical Care	Bed One	
1998	Half Baked	Grandma Smoker	

=== Television ===
Year	Title	Role	Notes
1987	Anne of Avonlea	Maid at Maplehurst	2 episodes
1989	Glory! Glory!	Mrs. Bexter	Television film
1990	The Kids in the Hall	Thirty Helens Agree #2	Episode #1.11
1990	Sanity Clause	Old Age Home Woman	Television film
1990	Road to Avonlea	Old Lady	Episode: "The Blue Chest of Arabella King"
1993	Matrix	Marge	Episode: "Marked Man"
1994	Side Effects	Mrs. Lyons	Episode: "Superman"
1995	Due South	Gladys	Episode: "An Eye for an Eye"
1998	The Wonderful World of Disney	Mavis	Episode: "The Garbage Picking Field Goal Kicking Philadelphia Phenomenon"
