= Gregg Rogell =

American professional comedian

- Born: February 18, 1967 (age 59); Long Island, New York, U.S.

Comedy career
- Medium: Stand-up, television, film

Gregg Rogell (born February 18, 1967) is an American professional comedian. Born on Long Island, Rogell resides in New York City and is a regular performer at the Comedy Cellar and the Comic Strip Live. He has appeared on The Tonight Show, Late Night with Conan O'Brien, Louie, Half Baked, and The Nanny. He has had his own half hour special on Comedy Central, and was a featured performer in the movie The Aristocrats.
