= Fly Away Home =

1996 film by Carroll Ballard

- Theatrical release poster
- Directed by: Carroll Ballard
- Screenplay by: Robert Rodat; Vince McKewin
- Based on: Father Goose: One Man, a Gaggle of Geese, and Their Real Life Incredible Journey South by Bill Lishman
- Produced by: Carol Baum
- Starring: Jeff Daniels; Anna Paquin; Dana Delany; Terry Kinney
- Cinematography: Caleb Deschanel
- Edited by: Nicholas C. Smith
- Music by: Mark Isham
- Production companies: Columbia Pictures; Sandollar Productions
- Distributed by: Sony Pictures Releasing
- Release date: September 13, 1996 (United States)
- Running time: 107 minutes
- Countries: Canada; United States; New Zealand
- Language: English
- Budget: $20 million
- Box office: $36.5 million

Fly Away Home (formerly Flying Wild) is a 1996 family adventure drama film directed by Carroll Ballard. The film stars Anna Paquin, Jeff Daniels, and Dana Delany. Fly Away Home was released on September 13, 1996, by Sony Pictures Releasing. Joseph Caleb Deschanel was nominated for best cinematography at the 69th Academy Awards for his work on the film.

Inspired by true events, Fly Away Home dramatizes the actual experiences of Bill Lishman who, in 1986, started training Canada geese to follow his ultralight aircraft, and succeeded in leading their migration in 1993 through his program "Operation Migration". The film is also based on the experience of Dr. William J. L. Sladen, a British-born zoologist and adventurer, who aided Lishman with the operation of the same name.

== Plot ==
After surviving a car accident, in which her mother Aliane dies swerving out of the way of an oncoming truck on a rainy night, 13-year-old Amy Alden is brought from New Zealand to Ontario, Canada, by her estranged father Thomas Alden, a sculptor and inventor, to live with him and his girlfriend Susan.

When a construction crew destroys a small wilderness area near the Alden home, Amy finds an abandoned nest of 17 goose eggs. Without her father's, Susan's, or her uncle David's knowledge, she takes the eggs and keeps them in a dresser in her father's barn to incubate. When the eggs hatch and imprint upon Amy, Thomas allows her to keep the goslings. Thomas seeks help from local Animal Regulation officer Glen Seifert on how to care for the geese. Seifert comes over to the Alden house, and explains that the geese have imprinted on Amy as their mother. He explains that geese learn everything from their parents, including migratory routes, but also warns Thomas that an ordinance dictates that all domestic geese who do not migrate must have their wings clipped to render them flightless, so they don't pass on diseases with wild birds. He promptly attempts to demonstrate the process with one of the goslings, which upsets and disturbs Amy, who reacts in anger. Thomas throws Seifert off his property, whereupon Seifert warns the Aldens that if the birds start flying, he will have to confiscate them.

Thomas ponders their situation and decides to try to use his ultralight aircraft to direct the birds to fly and show them their migratory routes, but realizes the birds will only follow Amy. Aided by his friend Barry, Thomas instructs Amy how to fly an ultralight aircraft of her own, and soon, the birds successfully follow her. David knows of a bird expert running a bird sanctuary in North Carolina, and after informing him of their intentions, arranges for the geese to fly to the sanctuary. The birds must arrive before November 1, or the sanctuary will be torn down by developers who plan to turn it into a coastal housing development.

Amy and Thomas practice flying the aircraft, to strengthen and build endurance for the geese to make the arduous journey. While attempting to include Igor, the weakest of the geese, to fly with the rest of the flock, he loses stability and accidentally hits the front of Amy's aircraft, landing in the surrounding forest. While the group searches for Igor, Seifert returns to the farm and confiscates the other geese. The following day, the Aldens and their friends free the geese from the government cages, and Amy and Thomas lead them on their migration to North Carolina, keeping the disabled Igor safely strapped in her cockpit.

Making an emergency landing at Niagara Falls Air Reserve Station in western New York on the south shore of Lake Ontario, Amy and Thomas almost get arrested. Their story and journey for the geese become national news, with residents all across the country celebrating them.

After their flock mingles with a larger wild flock which is being shot at by hunters, Thomas and Amy are compelled to land and meet an old woman with a vendetta against goose shooting, and she invites them to stay the night at her house. That evening, Amy asks Thomas why he rarely visited her and her mother after they moved to New Zealand. From her mother, she knows that her parents were artists, who tend to be selfish, and that her mother left for both their sakes. Thomas reveals that he was afraid and angry at himself for letting them leave, so he spent the next ten years buried in his work. Realizing Amy's resentment over his neglect to maintain contact with her, he apologizes.

Thirty miles before reaching the bird sanctuary, Thomas's aircraft suffers a structural failure and crashes in a cornfield. Suffering from a dislocated shoulder, he tells Amy to finish the journey by herself. At first she is uncertain that she can do it alone, but Thomas tells her she can, and that she is brave - just like her mother, who is always with her - in the geese, in the sky, and in herself. Amy, bolstered by these words of faith and encouragement, returns to her aircraft and takes flight with the geese. Thomas hitchhikes to the bird sanctuary. While waiting for Amy and the geese, Thomas, Susan, David, Barry, and the many supporters of Amy and the birds stand up to developers who are eager to commence the excavation of the site.

Amy eventually appears with the geese, much to the joy of the townspeople and Amy's family, and the dismay of the developers. The townspeople and the Aldens celebrate their victory and the safe arrival of the geese. During the end credits, a note reveals that all sixteen geese - including Igor - return to the Aldens' farm on their own the following spring.

== Cast ==
- Jeff Daniels as Thomas Alden
- Anna Paquin as Amy Alden
- Dana Delany as Susan Barnes
- Terry Kinney as David Alden
- Holter Graham as Barry Stickland
- Jeremy Ratchford as Glen Seifert
- Deborah Verginella as Aliane Alden
- Michael J. Reynolds as General Hatfield
- David Hemblen as Dr. Killian
- Ken James as Developer
- Nora Ballard as Jackie
- Sarena Paton as Laura
- Chris Benson as Farmer
- Gladys O'Connor as Farm Woman

== Music ==
The film features the song "10,000 Miles" performed by Mary Chapin Carpenter. "Wherever You Are", also performed by Carpenter, appears during the end credits, though it is not present in the Special Edition DVD version.

== Production ==
Two farms near Lindsay in southeastern Ontario were used to recreate the Alden home. Principal photography took place in 1995. The blacksmith shop constructed onsite for the filming of The Last Buffalo at Purple Hill, Ontario, was reused as part of the Alden homestead.

Caleb Deschanel, who had previously collaborated with director Carroll Ballard on the films The Black Stallion and Never Cry Wolf, returned as director of photography for Fly Away Home.

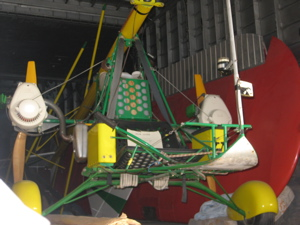
An example of an ultralight on display at the Western Canada Aviation Museum to publicize the film.

Two gliders were featured in the film: The UFM Easy Riser and the Cosmos Trike. The Easy Riser first appears as a foot-launched biplane hang glider. True to Lishman's real-life saga, modifications were made to improve the design including the addition of a motor and seat. Anna Paquin's character meanwhile flies an A-frame Cosmos Trike with a mock goose head mounted to the noseplate of the airframe and a fabric wing covering painted to resemble feathers (features Lishman wanted to add to his own Trike, but never did due to time). The Cosmos Trike was reportedly chosen for its safety, superior engine power, and increased wing size (a feature that was needed to fly slow enough for the birds).

The four-day trip home for the geese that would take them to Lake Ontario, over the Appalachians to Pennsylvania, Maryland, finally settling on the North Carolina Shores, had principal photography actually filmed nearly entirely at Port Perry and Sandbanks Provincial Park, Ontario, Canada. Additional location shots were the city-fly-through in Toronto, Ontario, standing in for Baltimore, Maryland (with CGI aircraft). At the conclusion of the production, Lishman led the 60 imprinted "actor-geese" in migration, to winter at the Tom Yawkey Wildlife Center off the coast of Georgetown, South Carolina. Lishman's son, sculptor Geordie Lishman, also worked on the production as a technical consultant and ground crew member for the birds.

While in production, the film was at first titled Flying Wild, but was changed to Fly Away Home just weeks before its release in movie theaters. The original trailer has the title Flying Wild, and can be found on certain VHS copies of Jumanji from Columbia TriStar Home Video; the French version title (L'Envolée sauvage) is the translated version of this title.

== Reception ==
=== Box office ===
Fly Away Home returned US$25 million in the U.S. box office and US$11 million internationally, for a worldwide total of $36.5 million.

=== Critical reception ===
On the review aggregator website Rotten Tomatoes, 88% of 48 critics' reviews are positive, with an average rating of 7.30/10. The website's consensus reads: "Well-acted and beautifully filmed, Fly Away Home offers heartwarming entertainment for moviegoers of all ages." On Metacritic, the film has a weighted average score of 77 out of 100 based on 28 critics' reviews, indicating "generally favorable" reviews.

In a review that awarded 3 and 1/2 stars out of 4, Roger Ebert noted: "There are individual shots here almost worth the price of admission...[including] a stunning shot in which the towers of Baltimore materialize from the mist, and office workers see the little girl and her geese flying past their windows." Janet Maslin from The New York Times was similarly effusive, writing "Mr. Ballard turns a potentially treacly children's film into an exhilarating 90's fable." Gene Shalit on the Today Show called the film "a must see movie".

Frederic and Mary Ann Brussat of Spirituality & Practice stated, "The movie adds excitement and emotion, turning into a celebration of the creative ways human beings and animals can serve, assist, and love one another."

=== Impact ===
The first production of investigative theater group The Civilians, Canard, Canard, Goose?, was inspired by rumors of animal mistreatment on Fly Away Home's set.

== Awards ==
Award	Category	Nominee(s)	Result	Ref.
Academy Awards	Best Cinematography	Caleb Deschanel	Nominated	
American Society of Cinematographers Awards	Best Cinematography – Theatrical Release	Caleb Deschanel	Nominated	
Christopher Awards	Best Family Film		Won	
Critics' Choice Awards	Best Child Performance	Anna Paquin	Nominated	
Critics' Choice Awards	Best Family Film		Won	
Environmental Media Awards	Feature Film		Won	
Genesis Awards	Award for Feature Film		Won	
Young Artist Awards	Best Family Feature – Drama		Won	
Young Artist Awards	Best Performance in a Feature Film – Leading Young Actress	Anna Paquin	Nominated	
YoungStar Awards	Best Performance by a Young Actress in a Drama Film	Anna Paquin	Nominated	

== Home media ==
Fly Away Home was more successful on home video than in theaters. The studio sold an estimated $32 million on video, receiving 75% of the revenue. The film was originally released to VHS in December 1996. A DVD release in August 2001 included the exclusive featurette by Bill Lishman, Operation Migration: Birds of a Feather, along with two documentaries: The Ultra Geese and the HBO special Leading the Flock. The DVD also provided a link to Lishman's "Operation Migration" website. A companion CD audio recording of the music featured in the soundtrack was released in 1996. A Blu-ray edition of Fly Away Home was released on April 7, 2009.

== See also ==
- Human-guided migration
- List of American films of 1996
- Imprinting (psychology)
- Winged Migration
