= International Crane Foundation =

US-based non-profit organization

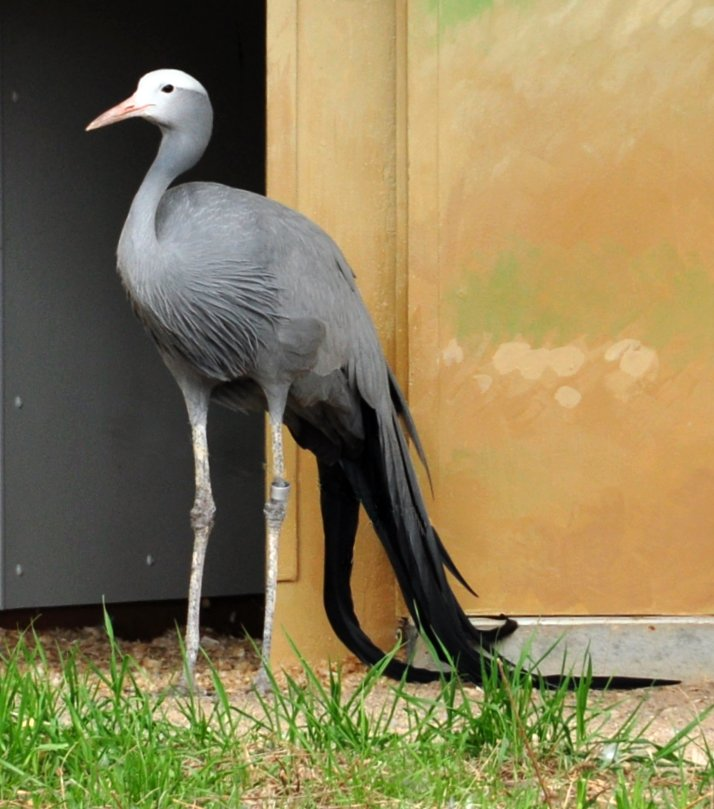
- A blue crane at the International Crane Foundation
- Interactive map of International Crane Foundation
- Location: E11376 Shady Lane Rd, Baraboo, Wisconsin, 53913
- Coordinates: 43.5477°N 89.7563°W
- Area: 240 acres (97 ha)
- Established: 1973
- Website: savingcranes.org

The International Crane Foundation (ICF) is a non-profit conservation organization that works to conserve cranes and the ecosystems, watersheds, and flyways on which they depend. Founded in 1973, the International Crane Foundation is headquartered in Baraboo, Wisconsin, on a 250-acre property that includes live crane exhibits with 15 crane species, a visitor center, breeding facilities, a research library and nature trails. The foundation works worldwide and in the US with local partners to raise and conserve cranes. The Foundation has offices in China, Uganda, Kenya, Zambia, and South Africa, as well as Texas, and works through strong partnerships with local organizations, governments, universities, businesses and others in these regions. The International Crane Foundation's more than 125 staff and associates work with a network of hundreds of specialists in over 50 countries on five continents.

== History ==
The International Crane Foundation was founded in 1973 by two ornithology students at Cornell University, Ron Sauey and George W. Archibald, who envisioned an organization that would combine research, captive breeding and reintroduction, landscape restoration, and education to safeguard the world's 15 crane species. In 1973, the Sauey family rented their Horse farm to Ron and George for $1 a year to found the International Crane Foundation in Baraboo, Wisconsin. The organization moved to its current location in 1983.

Archibald was the organization's director from 1973 to 2000. He pioneered several techniques there to rear cranes in captivity, including the use of crane costumes by human handlers. Archibald spent three years with a highly endangered Whooping crane named Tex, acting as a male crane – walking, calling, dancing – to shift her into reproductive condition. Through his dedication and the use of artificial insemination, Tex eventually laid a fertile egg which hatched a chick named Gee Whiz. Another crane hatched in ICF care, Walnut, was bred using similar techniques by keeper Chris Crowe at Smithsonian Conservation Biology Institute.

The International Crane Foundation's office in Rockport, Texas, was demolished in 2017 by Hurricane Harvey, but will be rebuilt. The office was located near the Aransas National Wildlife Refuge, an area that sustains the last naturally occurring flock of Whooping cranes.

== See also ==
- Aldo Leopold
