= Half Baked =

1998 film by Tamra Davis

- Theatrical release poster
- Directed by: Tamra Davis
- Written by: Dave Chappelle; Neal Brennan
- Produced by: Robert Simonds
- Starring: Dave Chappelle; Jim Breuer; Harland Williams; Guillermo Díaz; Clarence Williams III
- Cinematography: Steven Bernstein
- Edited by: Don Zimmerman
- Music by: Alf Clausen
- Production company: Robert Simonds Productions
- Distributed by: Universal Pictures
- Release date: January 16, 1998
- Running time: 79 minutes
- Country: United States
- Language: English
- Budget: $8 million
- Box office: $17.5 million

Half Baked is a 1998 American stoner comedy film starring Dave Chappelle, Jim Breuer, Harland Williams, and Guillermo Díaz. The film was directed by Tamra Davis, co-written by Chappelle and Neal Brennan and produced by Robert Simonds. Half Baked was released in the United States by Universal Pictures on January 16, 1998. It received negative reviews and grossed $17.5 million.

== Plot ==
Four lifelong stoners and friends (Thurgood, Scarface, Brian, and Kenny) live together in New York City. Thurgood, a janitor at a medical lab, orders some weed from Samson, the famous local dealer, and the four smoke it. When Kenny, a gentle kindergarten teacher, is out on a munchie run, he is arrested for accidentally killing a diabetic police horse called Buttercup by feeding it junk food. His friends are forced to raise 10 percent of $1 million to bail him out before the other prisoners take advantage of his gentle nature. While visiting Kenny in prison, Thurgood meets Mary Jane and pursues a romantic relationship, which is strained by his having to conceal his marijuana smoking from her, as she is adamantly anti-drug.

Thurgood gets asked one day by a scientist at the lab to get a pound of cannabis from storage and Thurgood freaks out when he realizes what the scientist had him get. The grateful scientist thanks Thurgood for the good deed by giving him some free weed. Thurgood brings it home and the three friends get high. Scarface gets the idea to have Thurgood steal medical marijuana from his work so that the three of them can sell it to raise money to free Kenny.

When the success of the friends' marijuana business grows enough to raise the ire of local drug lord Samson Simpson, Samson extorts them for $20,000 a week, while Mary Jane dumps Thurgood when she finds out he is dealing drugs. The friends plan a robbery of the medical laboratory to increase their earnings enough to both fend off Samson and free Kenny, but are arrested when they try to execute the plan.

Thurgood strikes a deal with the police to wear a wire to a meeting with Samson in exchange for freeing Kenny and dropping the charges against him and his friends. They meet with Samson, but their plan is exposed when the police detectives fail to arrive as backup since they are high. However, Thurgood and his friends are able to take out Samson's henchwomen, and Samson is taken out by the ghost of Jerry Garcia. The police detectives arrive soon after to arrest Samson and his henchwomen, while Thurgood and friends are released from police custody. Thurgood meets with Mary Jane to tell her he is giving up marijuana and wants to get back together. The film ends with their reuniting.

== Cast ==
- Dave Chappelle as Thurgood/Sir Smoka Lot
- Guillermo Díaz as Scarface
- Jim Breuer as Brian
- Harland Williams as Kenny
- Rachel True as Mary Jane
- Clarence Williams III as Samson Simpson
- Laura Silverman as Jan
- Tommy Chong as Squirrel Master
- R. D. Reid as Scientist
- Gregg Rogell and Kevin Brennan as potheads

Additionally, co-writer Neal Brennan appears as an employee. Other cameos include: Jon Stewart as the enhancement smoker, Snoop Doggy Dogg as the scavenger smoker, Stephen Baldwin as the MacGyver smoker, Gladys O'Connor as the grandma smoker, Willie Nelson as the historian smoker, Janeane Garofalo as the beatnik poet smoker and Tracy Morgan as the V.J. Steven Wright makes an uncredited appearance, and Bob Saget also appears.

== Production ==
Dave Chappelle and Jim Breuer shared a manager and had previously planned working together on the short-lived television sitcom Buddies. In mid-1996, both were working separately on marijuana-related film projects. Chappelle and Neal Brennan's script was complete, so Breuer was asked to join their project. Chappelle asked Harrison Ford to appear in a cameo role in the film but he declined.

The film was shot in Toronto in between July and August 1997.

== Release ==
Half Baked was released theatrically in the United States on January 16, 1998.

== Reception ==
=== Box office ===
Half Baked earned $7,722,540 in its opening weekend, ranking at number six. It went on to gross a total of $17,460,020.

=== Critical response ===
On the review aggregator website Rotten Tomatoes, 28% of 25 critics' reviews are positive, with an average rating of 4.4/10. The website's consensus reads: "You'd have to be high to dig Half Baked's half baked production and scattershot sense of humor -- although maybe that was the point of this Dave Chapelle-led joint." Metacritic, which uses a weighted average, assigned the film a score of 16 out of 100, based on 14 critics, indicating "overwhelming dislike".

Writing for The New York Times, Lawrence Van Gelder was very negative, commenting: "Not very funny, intelligent or grippingly plotted, it is likely to appeal only to those who think that anything to do with marijuana -- smoking, sharing, stealing or selling - constitutes the Everest of rip-roaring hilarity." Brendan Kelly of Variety wrote: "A couple of hash brownies short of a satisfying cinematic picnic, with far too few comic highs during the bigscreen reefer party."

== Sequel ==
Half Baked: Totally High was released by Universal Pictures Home Entertainment on April 16, 2024. The film was written by Justin Hires and directed by Michael Tiddes. Produced by Griff Furst of Universal 1440 Entertainment, it stars Dexter Darden, Moses Storm, Ramona Young, David Koechner, Frankie Muniz, Ash Santos, and Joel Courtney. Rachel True reprises her role as Mary Jane, while Harland Williams has a cameo. It completed filming in Baton Rouge, Louisiana, in 2022.
