= George W. Archibald =

American ornithologist

George William Archibald (born 13 July 1946) is a Canadian ornithologist. He co-founded the International Crane Foundation, and was the inaugural winner of the 2006 Indianapolis Prize.

Archibald was born in New Glasgow, Nova Scotia, Canada to Donald Edison and Annie Letitia ("Lettie") (née MacLeod) Archibald. He received his bachelor's degree from Dalhousie University in 1968 and his doctorate in 1975 from Cornell University. He married Kyoko Matsumoto on 15 August 1981.

== Work with cranes ==
In 1973, when cranes were in a perilous situation and many of the fifteen remaining species were on the brink of extinction, Archibald co-founded, with Ron Sauey, the International Crane Foundation in Baraboo, Wisconsin. He was director from 1973 to 2000. Currently he heads a World Conservation Union commission on crane survival. Forty years later, the world's cranes are still in a perilous situation.

Archibald pioneered several techniques to rear cranes in captivity, including the use of crane costumes by human handlers. Archibald spent three years with a highly endangered whooping crane named Tex, acting as a male crane – walking, calling, dancing – to shift her into reproductive condition. Through his dedication and the use of artificial insemination, Tex eventually laid a fertile egg. As Archibald recounted the tale on The Tonight Show in 1982, he stunned the audience and host Johnny Carson with the sad end of the story – the death of Tex shortly after the hatching of her one and only chick. His work inspired the 2016 children's book Dancing with Tex: The Remarkable Friendship to Save the Whooping Cranes by Lynn Sanders.

In order to protect the watersheds and grasslands where cranes live and to help increase migratory flight paths, Archibald has visited remote areas, including parts of Afghanistan, Cuba, India, Russia and the Korean Demilitarized Zone.

In 1984, Archibald was awarded a MacArthur Fellows Program grant for his work with cranes. In 1987, he was added to the UN's Global 500 Roll of Honour. In 2012, he was made a Member of the Order of Canada.
