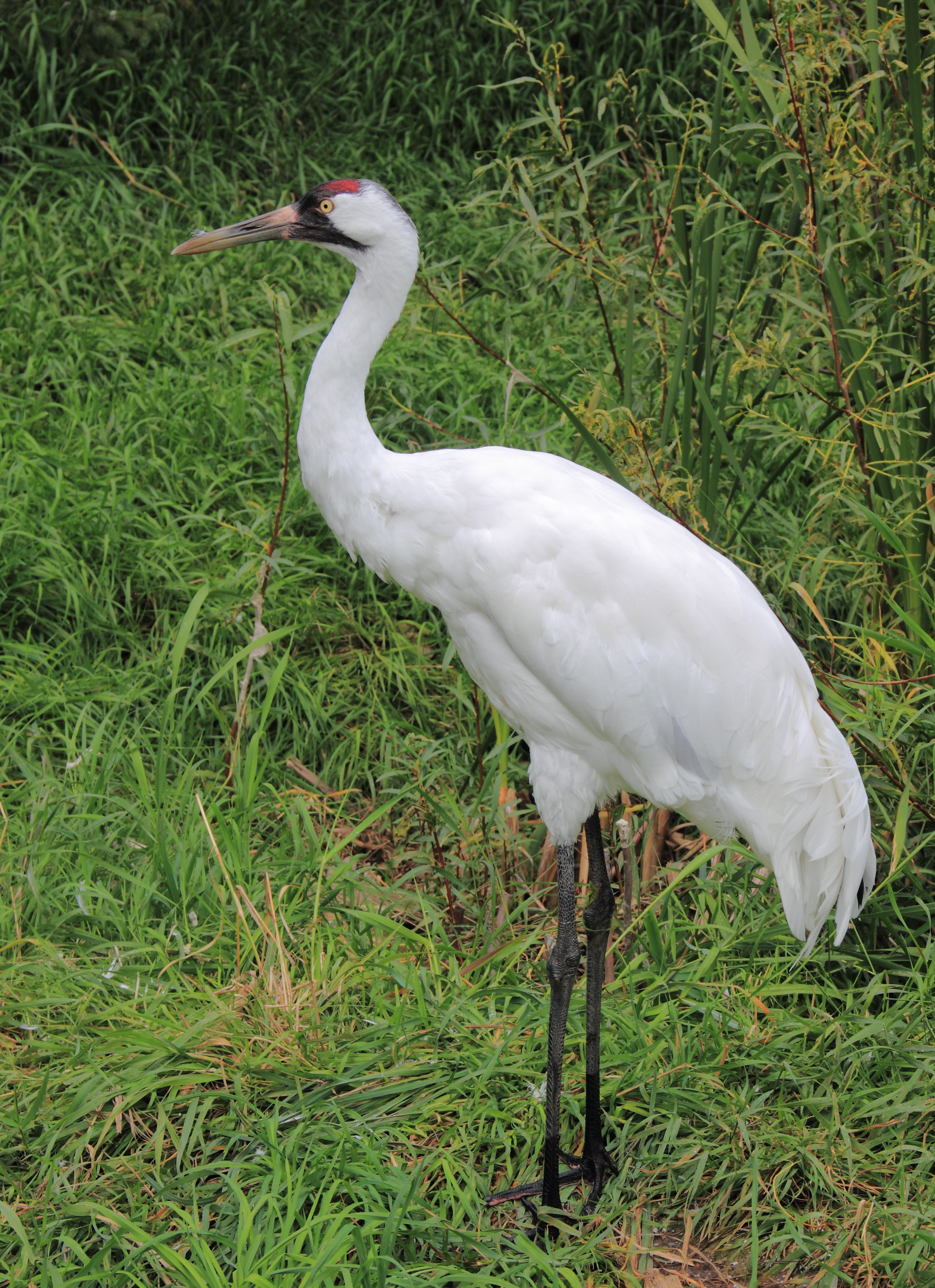
- In the Calgary Zoo, Alberta

Conservation status
- Endangered (IUCN 3.1)
- CITES Appendix I

Scientific classification
- Kingdom: Animalia
- Phylum: Chordata
- Class: Aves
- Order: Gruiformes
- Family: Gruidae
- Genus: Grus
- Species: G. americana

Binomial name
- Grus americana (Linnaeus, 1758)
- Distribution map of the whooping crane. breeding wintering year-round experimental year-round

Synonyms
- Ardea americana Linnaeus, 1758

= Whooping crane =

Species of large bird from North America

The whooping crane (Grus americana) is an endangered crane species, native to North America, named for its "whooping" calls. Along with the sandhill crane (Antigone canadensis), it is one of only two crane species native to North America, and it is also the tallest North American bird species, with an estimated 22–30+ year life expectancy in the wild. After being pushed to the brink of extinction by unregulated hunting and loss of habitat that left just 21 wild (and two captive) cranes by 1941, the whooping crane made a partial recovery through conservation efforts. The total number of cranes in the surviving migratory population, plus three reintroduced flocks and in-captivity, is just over 830 birds as of 2025. This includes about 560 individuals in the remnant population that migrates between coastal Texas, US, and the Northwest Territories, Canada, which is termed the "Aransas-Wood Buffalo Population" after the protected areas that anchor the population's wintering and breeding ranges, respectively. Additionally, there are about 140 individuals in two reintroduced populations breeding in Wisconsin and Louisiana, US, and an additional 130 individuals in captivity.

== Taxonomy ==
The whooping crane was formally described in 1758 by the Swedish naturalist Carl Linnaeus in the tenth edition of his Systema Naturae. He placed it with the herons and cranes in the genus Ardea and coined the binomial name Ardea america. Linnaeus based his description on the accounts of two English naturalists. In 1729–1732 Mark Catesby had described and illustrated the whooping crane in his The Natural History of Carolina, Florida and the Bahama Islands, and in 1750 George Edwards had described and illustrated the crane using a preserved specimen that had been brought to London from the Hudson Bay area of northeast Canada by James Isham, an employee of the Hudson's Bay Company. Linnaeus specified the type locality as North America but this has been restricted to the Hudson Bay. The whooping crane is now one of eight species placed in the genus Grus that was introduced in 1760 by the French zoologist Mathurin Jacques Brisson. There are no recognised subspecies.

== Distribution and habitat ==
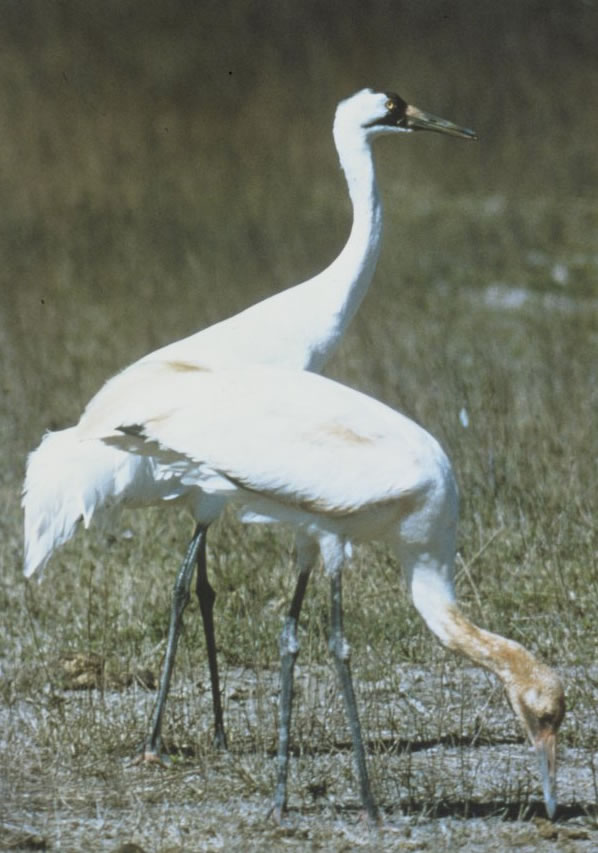
Whooping cranes breed in marshes.

At one time, the range for the whooping crane extended throughout midwestern North America as well as southward to Mexico. By the mid-20th century, the muskeg of the taiga in Wood Buffalo National Park, Alberta and Northwest Territories, Canada, and the surrounding area had become the last remnant of the former nesting habitat of the Whooping Crane Summer Range. However, with the recent Whooping Crane Eastern Partnership Reintroduction Project, whooping cranes nested naturally for the first time in 100 years in the Necedah National Wildlife Refuge in central Wisconsin, United States, and these have subsequently expanded their summer range in Wisconsin and surrounding states, while reintroduced experimental non-migratory populations have nested in Florida and Louisiana. However, the reintroduction in Florida has been halted and is considered a failure as a result of high adult mortality, low juvenile recruitment, and high rates of habitat loss

Whooping cranes nest on the ground, usually on a raised area in a marsh. The female lays 1 or 2 eggs, usually in late-April to mid-May. The blotchy, olive-coloured eggs average 2½ inches in breadth and 4 inches in length (60 by 100 mm), and weigh about 6.7 ounces (190 g). The incubation period is 29–31 days. Both parents brood the young, although the female is more likely to directly tend to the young. Usually no more than one young bird survives in a season. The parents often feed the young for 6–8 months after birth and the terminus of the offspring-parent relationship occurs after about 1 year.

Breeding populations winter along the Gulf coast of Texas, United States, near Rockport on the Aransas National Wildlife Refuge and along Sunset Lake in Portland, Matagorda Island, Isla San Jose, and portions of the Lamar Peninsula and Welder Point, which is on the east side of San Antonio Bay.

The Salt Plains National Wildlife Refuge in Oklahoma is a major migratory stopover for the crane population, hosting 60-75% of the species annually.

As many as nine whooping cranes were observed at various times on Granger Lake in Central Texas in the 2011/2012 winter season. Drought conditions in 2011 exposed much of the lake bed, creating ample feeding grounds for these cranes just as they were taking their autumn migration through Texas.

== Description ==
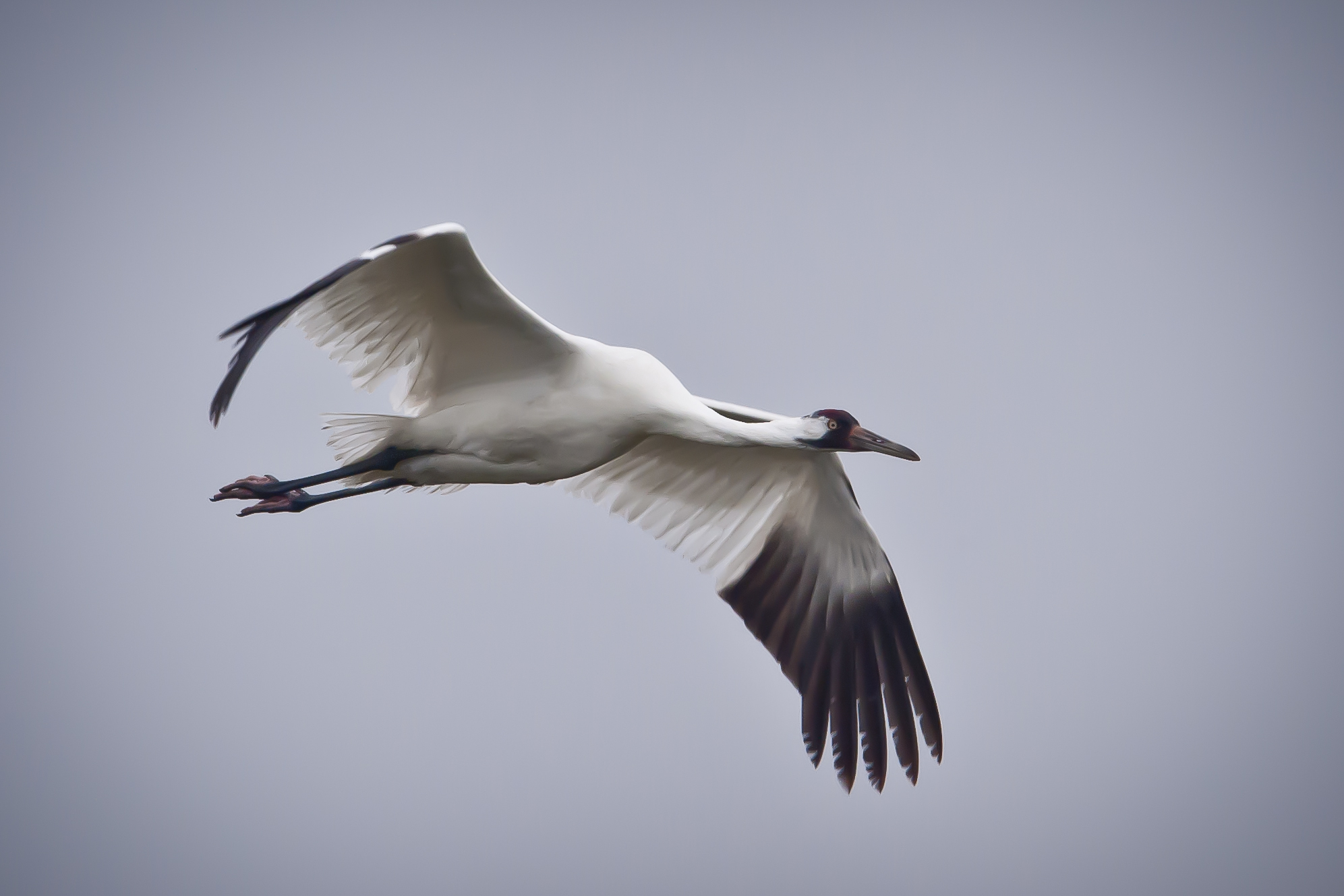
Whooping crane in flight

An adult whooping crane is white with a red crown and a long, dark, pointed bill. However, immature whooping cranes are cinnamon brown. While in flight, their long necks are kept straight and their long dark legs trail behind. Adult whooping cranes' black wing tips are visible during flight.

=== Size ===
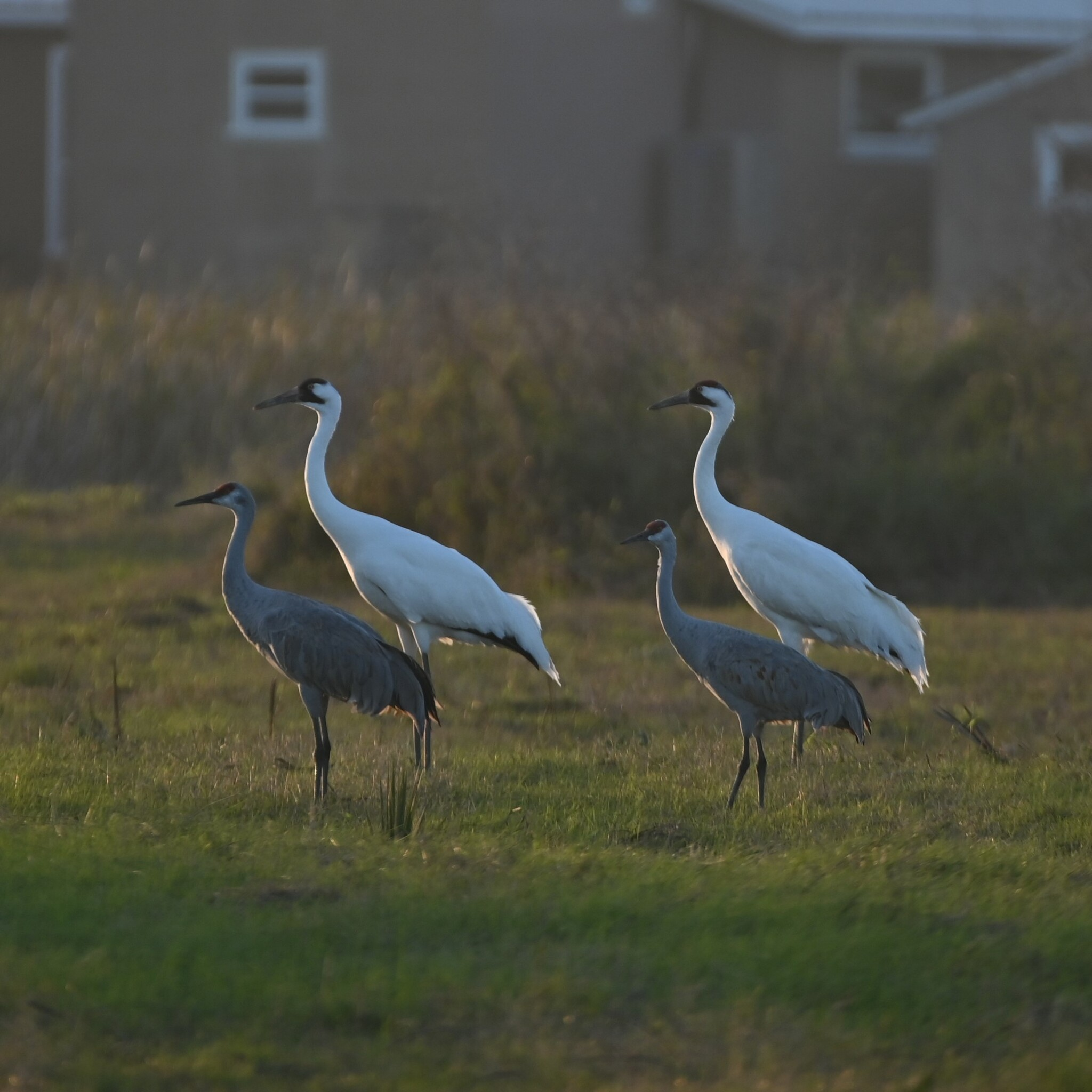
Whooping cranes with sandhill cranes, in Texas

On average, the whooping crane is the fifth-largest extant species of crane in the world. Whooping cranes are the tallest bird native to North America and are anywhere from the third to the fifth heaviest species on the continent, depending on which figures are used. The species can reportedly stand anywhere from 1.24 to 1.6 m (4 ft 1 in to 5 ft 3 in) in height. Wingspan, at least typically, is from 2 to 2.3 m (6 ft 7 in to 7 ft 7 in). Widely reported averages put males at a mean mass of 7.3 kg (16 lb), while females weigh 6.2 kg (14 lb) on average (Erickson, 1976). However, one small sample of unsexed whooping cranes weighed 5.82 kg (12.8 lb) on average. Typical weights of adults seem to be between 4.5 and 8.5 kg (9.9 and 18.7 lb). The body length, from the tip of the bill to the end of the tail, averages about 132 cm (4 ft 4 in). The standard linear measurements of the whooping cranes are a wing chord length of 53–63 cm (21–25 in), an exposed culmen length of 11.7–16 cm (4.6–6.3 in) and a tarsus of 26–31 cm (10–12 in).

The only other very large white birds in North America are: the American white pelican, the great egret, which is over a foot (30 cm) shorter and one-seventh the weight of this crane; the great white heron, which is a morph of the great blue heron in Florida; and the wood stork. The pelican is a similar size in flight and also is white with black-tipped wings, but has shorter legs and a significantly bigger beak. The other birds are at least 30% smaller than the whooping crane. Herons and storks are also quite different in structure from the crane. Larger individuals (especially males of the larger races) of sandhill crane can overlap in size with adult whooping cranes but are obviously distinct at once for their gray rather than white color.

=== Vocalizations ===
Their calls are loud and can carry several kilometers. They express "guard calls", apparently to warn their partner about any potential danger. A crane pair jointly calls rhythmically ("unison call") after waking in the early morning, after courtship, and when defending their territory. The first unison call ever recorded in the wild was taken in the whooping cranes' wintering area of the Aransas National Wildlife Refuge during December 1999.

== Predators ==
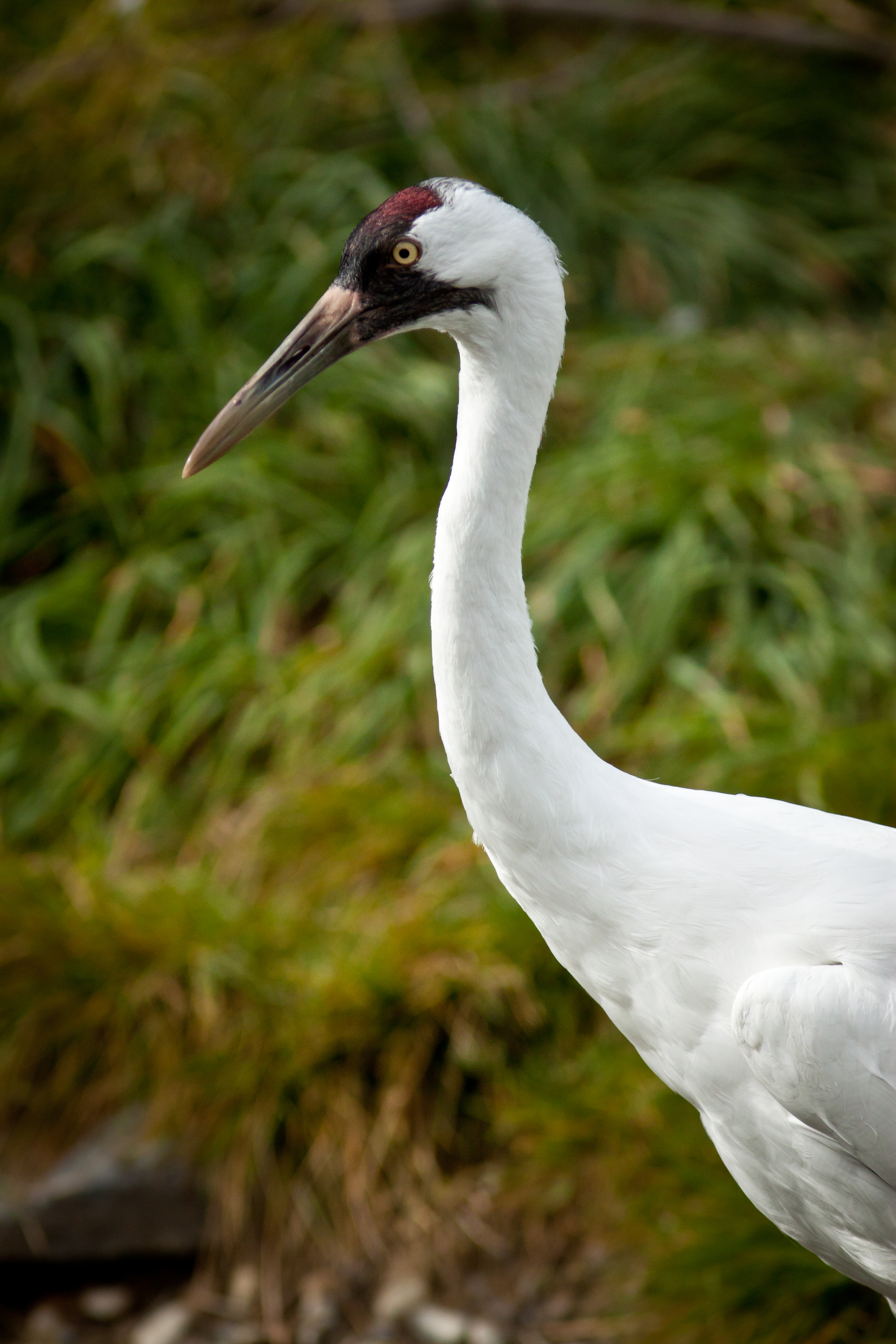
At Calgary Zoo, Alberta

Their many potential nest and brood predators include the American black bear, wolverine, gray wolf, cougar, red fox, Canada lynx, bald eagle, and common raven. Golden eagles have killed some young whooping cranes and fledglings. Due to their large size, adult birds in the wild have few predators. However, American alligators have taken a few whooping cranes in Florida, and the bobcat has killed many captive-raised whooping cranes in Florida and Texas. In Florida, bobcats have caused the great majority of natural mortalities among whooping cranes, including several ambushed adults and the first chick documented to be born in the wild in 60 years. Adult cranes can usually deter or avoid attacks by medium-sized predators such as coyotes when aware of a predator's presence, but the captive-raised cranes haven't learned to roost in deep water, which makes them vulnerable to ambush. As they are less experienced, juvenile cranes may be notably more vulnerable to ambushes by bobcats. Patuxent Wildlife Research Center scientists believe that this is due to an overpopulation of bobcats caused by the absence or decrease in larger predators (the endangered Florida panther and the extirpated red wolf) that formerly preyed on bobcats. At least 12 bobcats have been trapped and relocated in an attempt to save the cranes.

In Florida, whooping cranes may be eaten by some growth stage of invasive snakes such as Burmese pythons, reticulated pythons, Southern African rock pythons, Central African rock pythons, boa constrictors, yellow anacondas, Bolivian anacondas, dark-spotted anacondas, and green anacondas.

== Diet ==
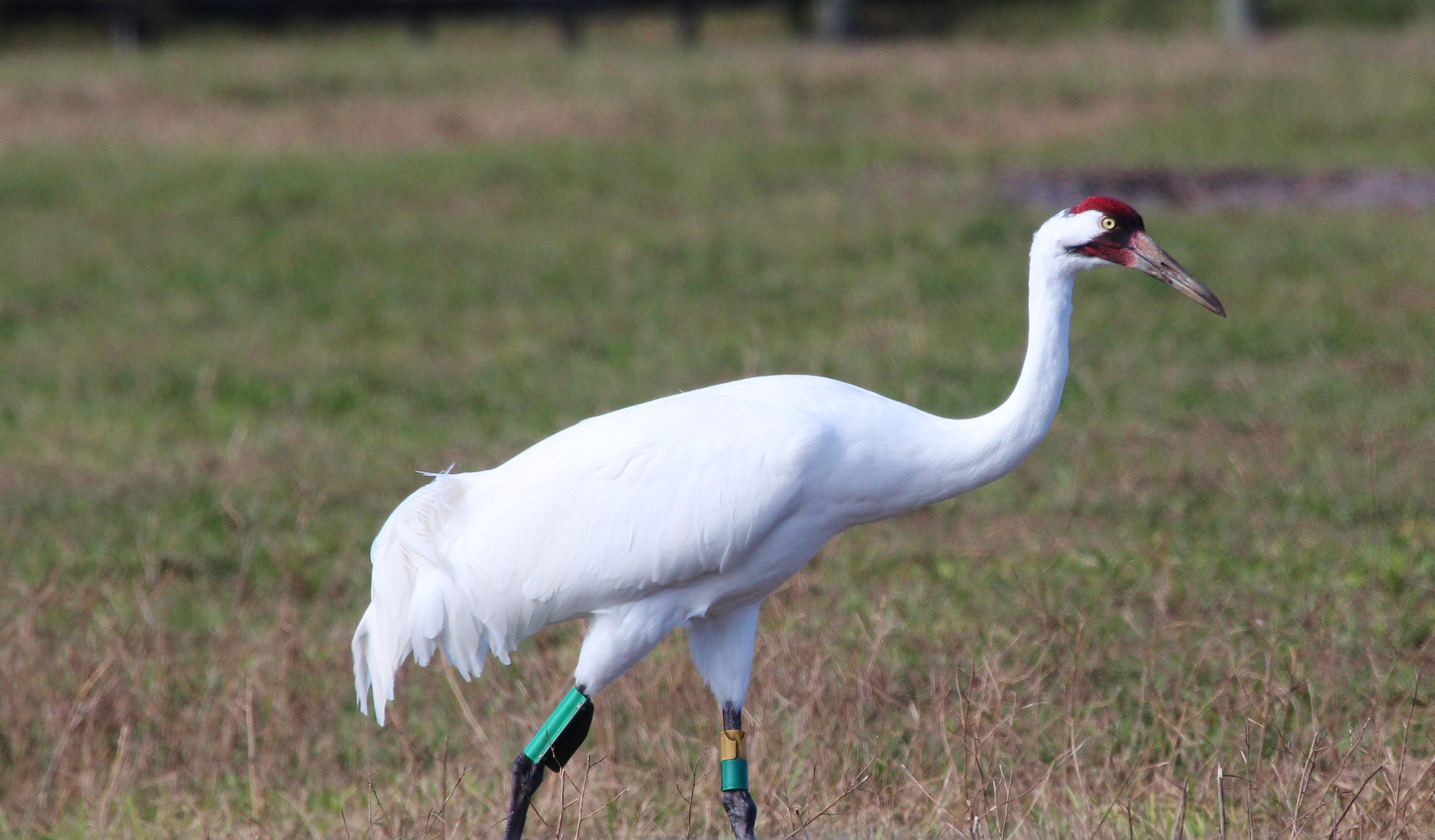
A whooping crane foraging on a cattle ranch in Osceola County, Florida

These birds forage while walking in shallow water or in fields, sometimes probing with their bills. They are omnivorous but tend to be more inclined to animal material than most other cranes. Only the red-crowned crane may have a more carnivorous diet among living cranes. In their Texas wintering grounds, this species feeds on various crustaceans, mollusks, grasshoppers, fish (such as eel), small reptiles (such as snakes), mice, voles, aquatic plants, acorns and fruits (such as wolfberry [Lycium carolinianum]). Potential foods of breeding birds in summer include frogs, snakes, small rodents, small birds, fish (such as minnows), aquatic insects, crayfish, clams, snails, aquatic tubers, and berries. Six studies from 1946 to 2005 have reported that blue crabs (Callinectes sapidus) are a significant food source for whooping cranes wintering at Aransas National Wildlife Refuge, constituting up to 90 percent of their energy intake in two winters, 1992–93 and 1993–94.

Waste grain, including wheat, barley, and corn, is an important food for migrating whooping cranes, but they do not swallow gizzard stones; they digest grain less efficiently than sandhill cranes.

== Individual recognition, territorial and partnership fidelity ==
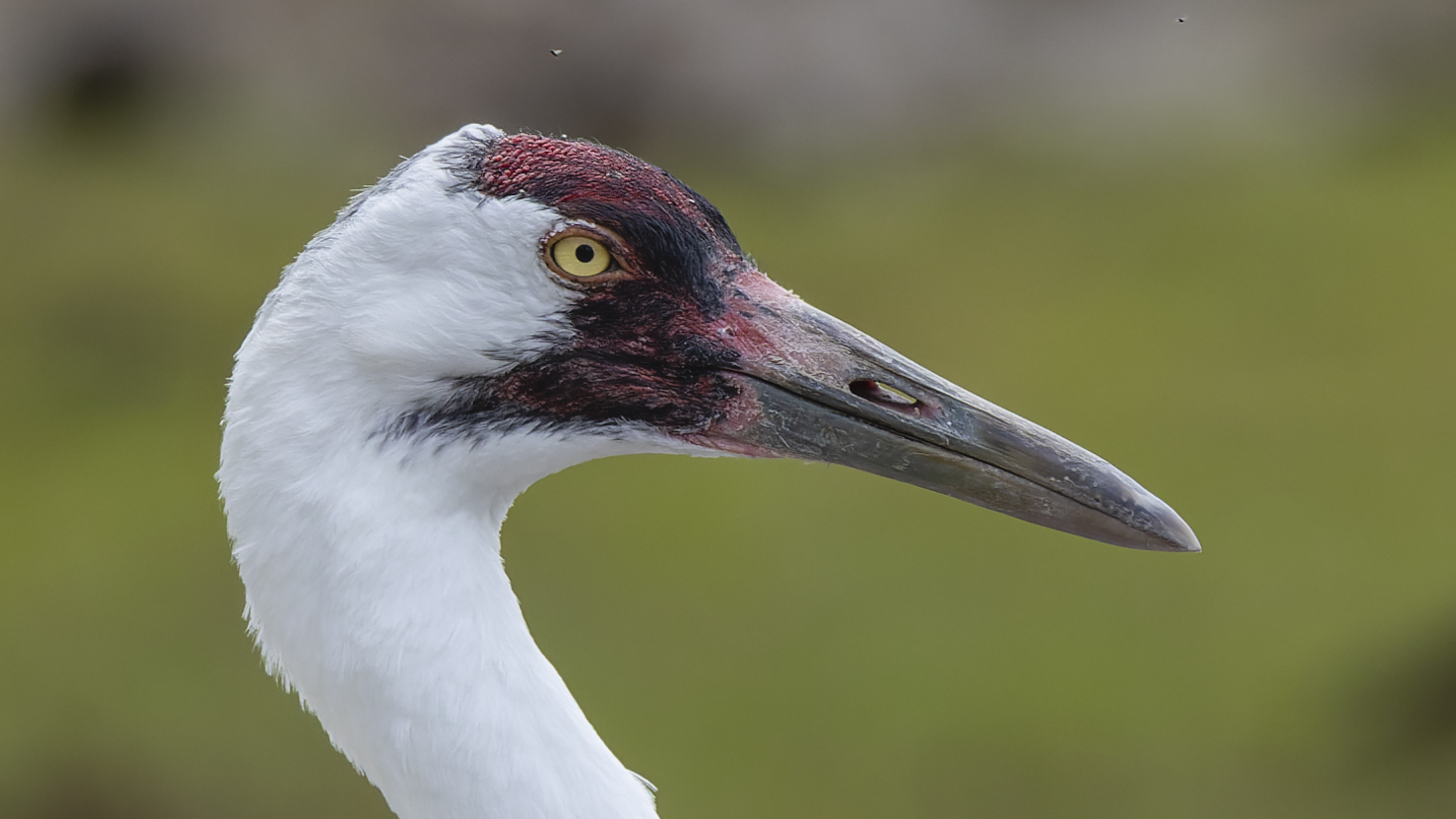
Head of a whooping crane in Florida

In earlier years, whooping crane chicks were caught and banded in the breeding areas of Wood Buffalo National Park. Although this delivered valuable insight into individual life history and behaviour, it has been discontinued due to risks to the cranes and the people involved.

By recording guard and unison calls followed by frequency analysis of the recording, a "voiceprint" of the individual crane (and of pairs) can be generated and compared over time. This technique was developed by B. Wessling and applied in the Aransas National Wildlife Refuge and also partially in the breeding grounds in Canada over five years. It delivered interesting results, i.e. that besides a certain fraction of stable pairs with strong affinity to their territories, there is a big fraction of cranes who change partners and territories. Only one of the exciting results was to identify the "Lobstick" male when he still had his band; he later lost his band and was recognized by frequency analysis of his voice and then was confirmed to be over 26 years old and still productive.

== Conservation efforts ==
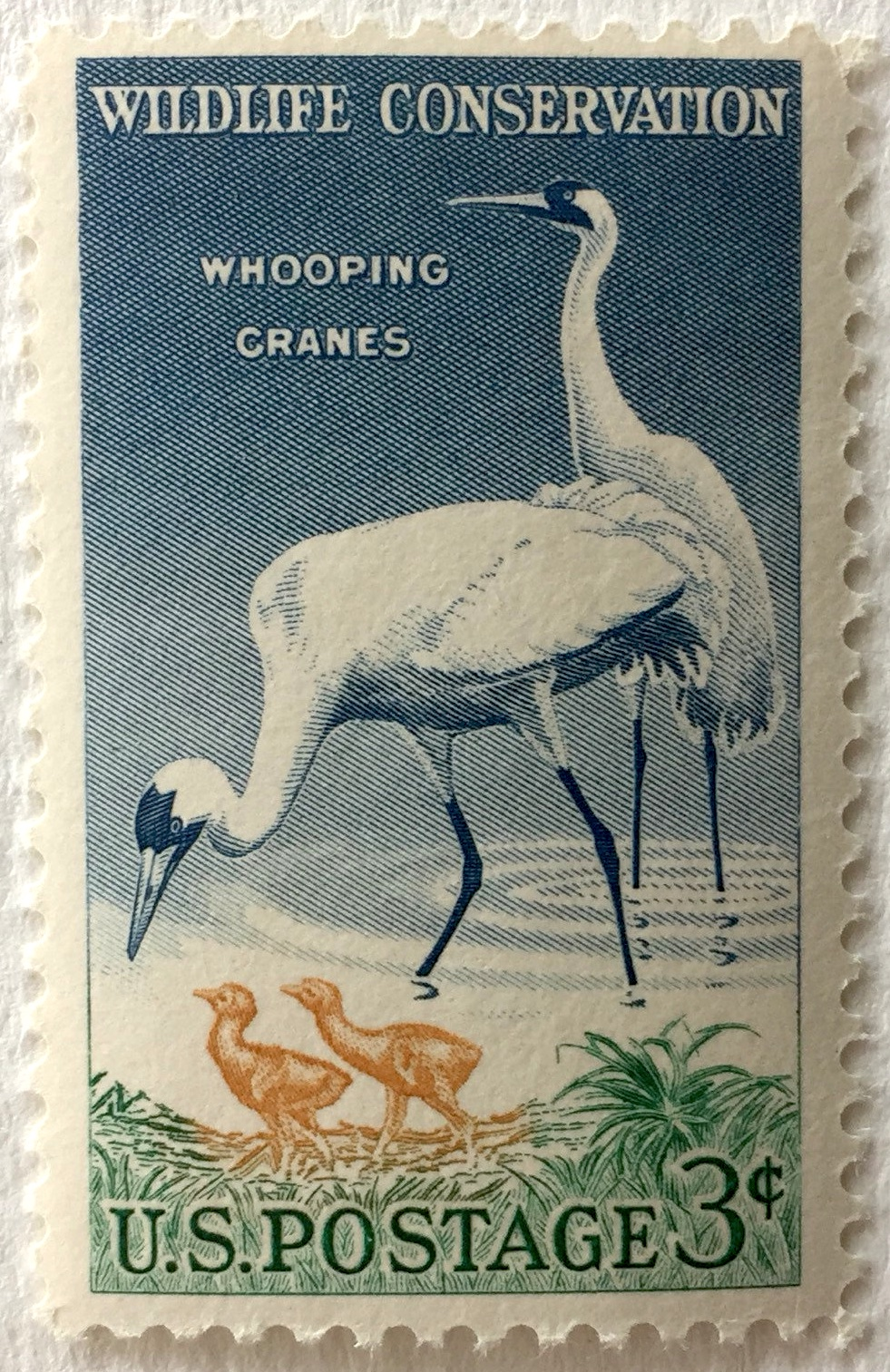
In 1957, the whooping crane was featured on a US postage stamp supporting wildlife conservation.

Whooping cranes are believed to have been naturally rare, and major population declines caused by habitat destruction and overhunting led them to become critically endangered. Even with hunting bans, illegal hunting has continued in spite of potential substantial financial penalties and possible prison time. The population went from an estimated 10,000+ birds before the settling of Europeans on the continent to 1,300-1,400 birds by 1870. By 1938 there were just 15 adults in a single migratory flock, plus about thirteen additional birds living in a non-migratory population in Louisiana, but the latter were scattered by a 1940 hurricane that killed half of them, while the survivors never again reproduced in the wild.

In the early 1960s, Robert Porter Allen, an ornithologist with the National Audubon Society, appeared as a guest challenger on the network television show To Tell The Truth, which gave the Conservation movement some opportunity to update the public on their efforts to save the whooping crane from extinction. His initial efforts focused on public education, particularly among farmers and hunters. Beginning in 1961, the Whooping Crane Conservation Association (WCCA), was established to improve the status of the whooping cranes. This non-profit organization functioned largely by influencing federal, state and provincial political decisions and educating the general public about the critical status of the bird. The whooping crane was declared endangered in 1967.

Allen had begun an effort at captive breeding with a female crane named 'Josephine', the sole survivor of the Louisiana population, injured and taken into captivity in 1940, and two successive injured birds from the migratory population, 'Pete' and 'Crip', at the Audubon Zoo and the Aransas National Wildlife Refuge. Josephine and Crip produced the first whooping crane born in captivity in 1950, but this chick only lived four days, and though decades of further efforts produced more than 50 eggs before Josephine's death in 1965, only four chicks survived to adulthood and none of them bred.

At the same time, the wild population was not thriving. In spite of the efforts of conservationists, hunting bans, and educational programs, the aging wild population would gain only 10 birds in the first 25 years of monitoring, with entire years passing without a single new juvenile joining those that returned to the Texas wintering grounds. This led to a renewed tension between those who favored efforts to preserve the wild population and others seeing a captive breeding program as the only hope for whooping crane survival, even though it must depend on individuals withdrawn from the extremely-vulnerable wild population.

Identification of the location of the summer breeding grounds of the whooping cranes at Wood Buffalo National Park in 1954 allowed more detailed study of their reproductive habits in the wild, and led to the observation that while many breeding pairs laid two eggs, rearing efforts seemed to favor a single chick, and both chicks would almost never survive to fledge. It was concluded that the removal of a single egg from a two-egg clutch should still leave a single hatchling most likely to survive, while providing an individual for captive breeding.

Such removals in alternating years showed no decline in the reproductive success of the wild cranes. The withdrawn eggs were transferred to the Patuxent Wildlife Research Center in Maryland, where approaches for hatching and rearing crane chicks in captivity had already been optimized using the more-numerous sandhill cranes. Initial challenges getting the resultant birds to reproduce, even using artificial insemination approaches, would give impetus to the first, unsuccessful attempt at reintroduction, by swapping whooping crane eggs into the nests of the more numerous sandhill cranes as a way to establish a backup population.

In 1976, with the wild population numbering only 60 birds and having increased at an average of only one bird per year over the past decades, ornithologist George W. Archibald, co-founder of the International Crane Foundation in Baraboo, Wisconsin, began working with 'Tex', a female whooping crane hatched at the San Antonio Zoo in 1967 to Crip and his new mate, the wild-captured 'Rosie', to get her to lay a fertile egg through artificial insemination. Archibald pioneered several techniques to rear cranes in captivity, including the use of crane costumes by human handlers.

Archibald spent three years with Tex, acting as a male crane – walking, calling, dancing – to shift her into reproductive condition. As Archibald recounted the tale on The Tonight Show in 1982, he stunned the audience and host Johnny Carson with the sad end of the story – the death of Tex shortly after the hatching of her one and only chick, named 'Gee Whiz'. Gee Whiz was successfully raised and mated with female whooping cranes.

The techniques pioneered at Patuxent, the International Crane Foundation, and a program at the Calgary Zoo would give rise to a robust multi-institutional captive breeding program that would supply the cranes used in several additional captive breeding and reintroduction programs. A single male crane, 'Canus', rescued in 1964 as an injured wild chick and taken to Patuxent in 1966, would by the time of his 2003 death be the sire, grandsire or great-grandsire of 186 captive-bred whooping cranes.

Meanwhile, the wild crane population began a steady increase, such that in 2007 the Canadian Wildlife Service counted 266 birds at Wood Buffalo National Park, with 73 mating pairs that produced 80 chicks, 39 of which completed the fall migration.

The wild cranes winter in marshy areas along the Gulf Coast in and surrounding the Aransas National Wildlife Refuge. An environmental group, The Aransas Project, has sued the Texas Commission on Environmental Quality (TCEQ), maintaining that the agency violated the Endangered Species Act by failing to ensure adequate water supplies for the birds' range. The group attributes the deaths of nearly two dozen whooping cranes in the winter of 2008 and 2009 to inadequate flows from the San Antonio and Guadalupe rivers.

In March 2013 during continuing drought conditions, a federal court ordered TCEQ to develop a habitat protection plan for the crane and to cease issuing permits for waters from the San Antonio and Guadalupe rivers. A judge amended the ruling to allow TCEQ to continue issuing permits necessary to protect the public's health and safety. An appeals court eventually granted a stay in the order during the appeals process. The Guadalupe-Blanco and San Antonio river authorities joined TCEQ in the lawsuit, warning that restricting the use of their waters would have serious effects on the cities of New Braunfels and San Marcos as well as major industrial users along the coast.

To address the potential of future crowding that may result from the increasing migratory population, in 2012 and following years, purchases of small plots of land and acquisition of conservation easements covering larger areas has led to the protection of tens of thousands of additional acres of potential coastal habitat near the Aransas reserve. A large purchase of over 17,000 acres in 2014 was paid for with $35 million made available from the settlement over the Deepwater Horizon oil spill and an additional $15 million raised by a Texas parks non-profit.

Concerns have been raised over the effects of climate change on the migratory cycle of the surviving wild population. The cranes arrive on their nesting grounds in April and May to breed and begin their nesting. When young whooping cranes are ready to leave the nest, they depart in September and follow the migratory trail through Texas.

In 2017, the decision was made for the Patuxent Wildlife Research Center to end its 51-year effort to breed and train whooping cranes for release, due to changing priorities and in the face of budget cuts by the Trump administration. Their flock of 75 birds was moved in 2018 to join captive breeding programs at zoos or private foundations, including the Calgary Zoo, the International Crane Foundation, the Audubon Species Survival Center in Louisiana, and other sites in Florida, Nebraska, Oklahoma and Texas. This relocation is expected to negatively impact the reproductive success of the captive cranes, at least in the short term, and concerns were raised over its impact on the reintroduction efforts for which the Patuxent program had been providing birds.

A United States Fish and Wildlife Service count in early 2017 estimated that 505 whooping cranes, including 49 juveniles, had arrived at Aransas National Wildlife Refuge that season. As of 2020, there were an estimated 677 birds living in the wild, in the remnant original migratory population as well as three reintroduced populations, while 177 birds were at the time held in captivity at 17 institutions in Canada and the United States, putting the total population at over 800.

In 2023, changes made to the EPA's rules for managing protected wetland habitats raised concerns that resulting habitat loss and fragmentation could jeopardize the whooping crane's recovery. The reduction or removal of many environmental protections under the second Trump administration have likewise raised concerns by conservationists.

=== Reintroduction ===
Several attempts have been made to establish other breeding populations outside of captivity.

- The first project, carried out by the United States Fish and Wildlife Service and the Canadian Wildlife Service and initiated in 1975, involved cross-fostering second eggs from the wild population in the nests of sandhill cranes to establish a second self-sustaining flock using a flyway from Idaho across Utah to New Mexico. The 289 transplanted eggs resulted in 85 chicks that learned to migrate, but the whooping cranes failed to mate with other whooping cranes due to imprinting on their sandhill foster parents. The project was discontinued in 1989, and no members of this population survived. The initiation of this effort and the problem of imprinting are explored in the 1976 documentary A Great White Bird.
- A second effort involved the establishment of a non-migratory population near Kissimmee, Florida, by a cooperative effort led by the US and Canadian Whooping Crane Recovery Team in 1993. A total of 289 captive-bred birds provided by the International Crane Foundation were released in the wild between 1993 and 2004. Though in 2003 the population had produced the first chick conceived in the wild to reintroduced cranes, a decision was made in 2005 to release no further birds into the population until problems with high mortality and poor reproductive success were resolved. Studies of the population were discontinued in 2012. The population numbered about 50 adults and 4 chicks in October 2006 but subsequently dwindled to just 14 cranes in March 2018. The Fish and Wildlife Service proposed a plan to relocate the surviving Kissimmee crane population to join the newer Louisiana reintroduced non-migratory flock, and due to the lack of available mates, two Florida birds were moved to Louisiana in February 2019, including the mother of the first wild-born chick. As of 2020, there were just 9 birds remaining in the Florida population, with another relocated to Louisiana in 2021.

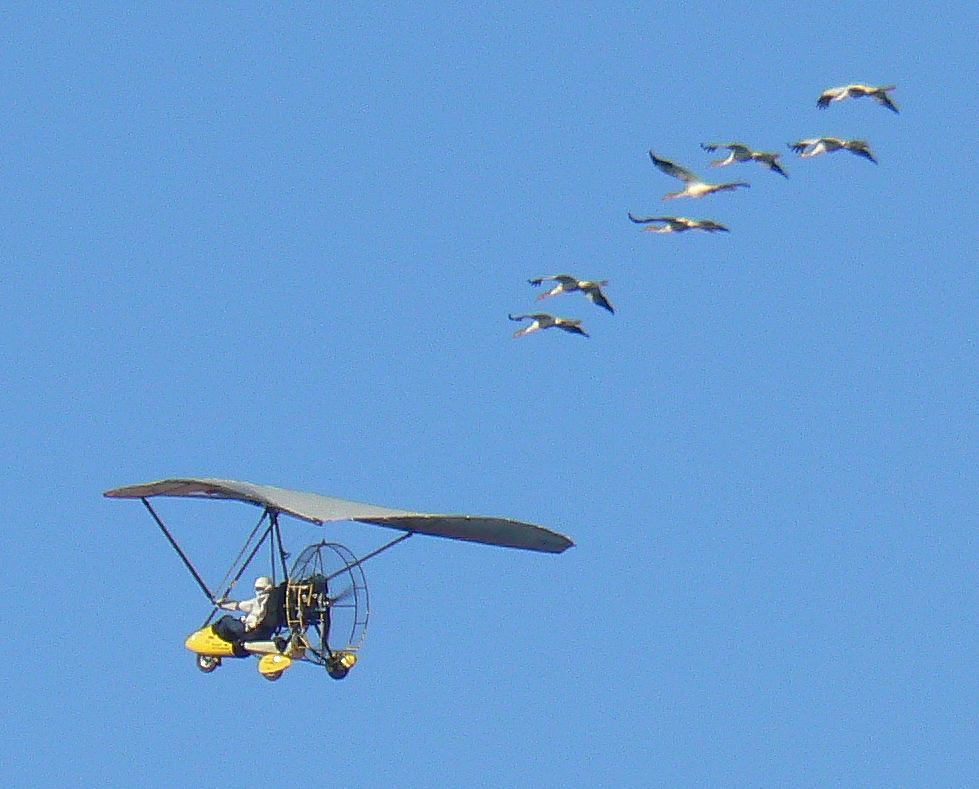
Young whooping cranes destined for the Eastern Migratory Population of reintroduced birds completing their first migration, from Wisconsin to Florida, in January 2009, following an ultralight aircraft

- A third attempt has involved reintroducing the whooping crane to a new flyway established east of the Mississippi river, with its southern end just west of the Atlantic flyway. This project used isolation rearing of young whooping cranes and trained them to follow ultralight aircraft, a method of re-establishing migration routes pioneered by Bill Lishman and Joe Duff working with Canada geese. The ultralight flights were managed by a non-profit organization, Operation Migration, working with the larger Whooping Crane Eastern Partnership (WCEP), which oversees all aspects of the reintroduced Eastern Migratory Population. Subsequent to hatching, the Operation Migration cranes were taught to follow the ultralight, fledged over their future breeding territory in Wisconsin, and led by the aircraft on their first migration from Wisconsin to Florida. Having learned the migratory route, they then returned north on their own the following spring. With the growth of this reintroduced population, WCEP also began releasing captive-reared juvenile cranes directly into the flock to learn migratory behavior from their peers, in a process referred to as Direct Autumn Release (DAR).

This reintroduction began in fall 2001 and added birds to the population in subsequent years. Two whooping crane chicks were hatched in the wild from one nest in 2006, to parents that had been part of the first ultralight-led release in 2002, and one of these survived to successfully migrate with her parents to Florida. In early February, 2007, 17 yearlings in a group of 18 were killed by the 2007 Central Florida tornadoes, with the sole survivor dying in late April an unknown cause, possibly related to the storm trauma. Two of the four DAR chicks from 2006 were also lost due to predation. In spite of this, as of May 2011, there were 105 surviving whooping cranes in the Eastern Migratory Population (EMP), including 17 that had formed pairs, several of which are nesting and are incubating eggs.

In December 2011, the Operation Migration escort of nine cranes was interrupted by the Federal Aviation Administration due to a regulation prohibiting paid pilots of ultralight aircraft. After a month with the cranes kept in a pen, the FAA finally granted a one-time exemption to allow completion of the migration. In January 2016, citing the near-total failure of the hand-raised and guided birds to reproduce in the wild, the Fish and Wildlife Service made a decision to discontinue the ultralight program in favor of alternatives with reduced human interaction. In June 2018, the size of this population was estimated at 102 birds. This number had dropped to 86 birds in 2020.

- Due to the vulnerability and low reproductive success of the Florida non-migratory population, a new effort was made to establish a non-migratory population in Louisiana's White Lake Wetlands Conservation Area, the home of the historical non-migratory population of whooping cranes. This is a cooperative effort of the US Fish and Wildlife Service, the US Geological Survey, the Louisiana Department of Wildlife and Fisheries, the Louisiana Cooperative Fish and Wildlife Research Unit at LSU, and the International Crane Foundation. In March 2011, 10 cranes were released, but all but three had been lost by the time a second group of 16 were released in December. Subsequent annual cohorts followed, ranging in size from 10 to 27 birds. In 2019, the population began receiving birds relocated from the failed Florida reintroduction effort with the arrival of a 21-year-old reintroduced female and her wild-born 4-year-old daughter, followed by the transfer of a juvenile female in 2021.

The flock has established a range centered on southwestern Louisiana but also including central and northeastern Louisiana and east Texas, with an occasional stray found more broadly. None of the first released group survived to full maturity, but in the Spring of 2014 the second cohort of birds began to form pairs and nest, producing the population's first eggs, although since the parents were still juveniles these eggs were infertile. The next year saw fertile eggs but none survived to hatching. However, in April 2016 a pair of reintroduced cranes hatched two chicks, one of which survived to fledge, represented the first in the wild in Louisiana since 1939. Starting in 2017, a novel strategy was introduced: eggs in the process of hatching, taken from captive birds, were swapped into Louisiana nests in place of infertile eggs, allowing the chicks to be raised by substitute crane parents in the wild. In 2018, a combination of naturally-laid and substituted eggs added five wild-raised juveniles to the population, which all survived to fledge. As of August 2018, 125 birds had been released, with at least 65 surviving, while in 2020 following further releases, relocations from Florida, and several wild fledglings, there were 76 birds in this population.

A major hurdle with some of these reintroduced populations has been deaths to illegal hunting. Over a period of two years, five of the approximately 100 whooping cranes in the Eastern Migratory Population were illegally shot and killed. One of the dead cranes was the female known as "First Mom". In 2006, she and her mate were the first eastern captive raised and released pair to successfully raise a chick to adulthood in the wild. This was a particular blow to that population because whooping cranes do not yet have an established successful breeding situation in the East. On March 30, 2011, Wade Bennett, 18, of Cayuga, Indiana and an unnamed juvenile pleaded guilty to killing First Mom. After killing the crane, the juvenile had posed holding up her body. Bennett and the juvenile were sentenced to a $1 fine, probation, and court fees of about $500, a penalty which was denounced by various conservation organizations as being too light. The prosecuting attorney has estimated that the cost of raising and introducing to the wild one whooping crane could be as much as $100,000. Overall, the International Crane Foundation estimates that the nearly 20% of deaths among the reintroduced cranes in the Eastern Migratory Population are due to shootings.

Illegal shootings have accounted for an even larger proportion of mortality among the birds introduced into the Louisiana population, with about 10% of the first 147 released cranes being shot and killed. Two juveniles were apprehended for a 2011 incident, a Louisiana man was sentenced to 45 days imprisonment and a $2500 fine after pleading guilty to a killing in November 2014, and a Texas man was fined $25,000 for a January 2016 shooting and barred from possessing firearms during a 5-year probation period, on subsequent violation of which he was given an 11-month custodial sentence. On the other hand, a Louisiana man cited for a July 2018 shooting received probation, community service and hunting and fishing restrictions but no fine or firearms restriction. Two Louisiana juveniles were cited in 2018 for a May 2016 incident.

== See also ==
- Puppet-rearing
