= Bill Lishman =

Canadian inventor, artist and flying enthusiast

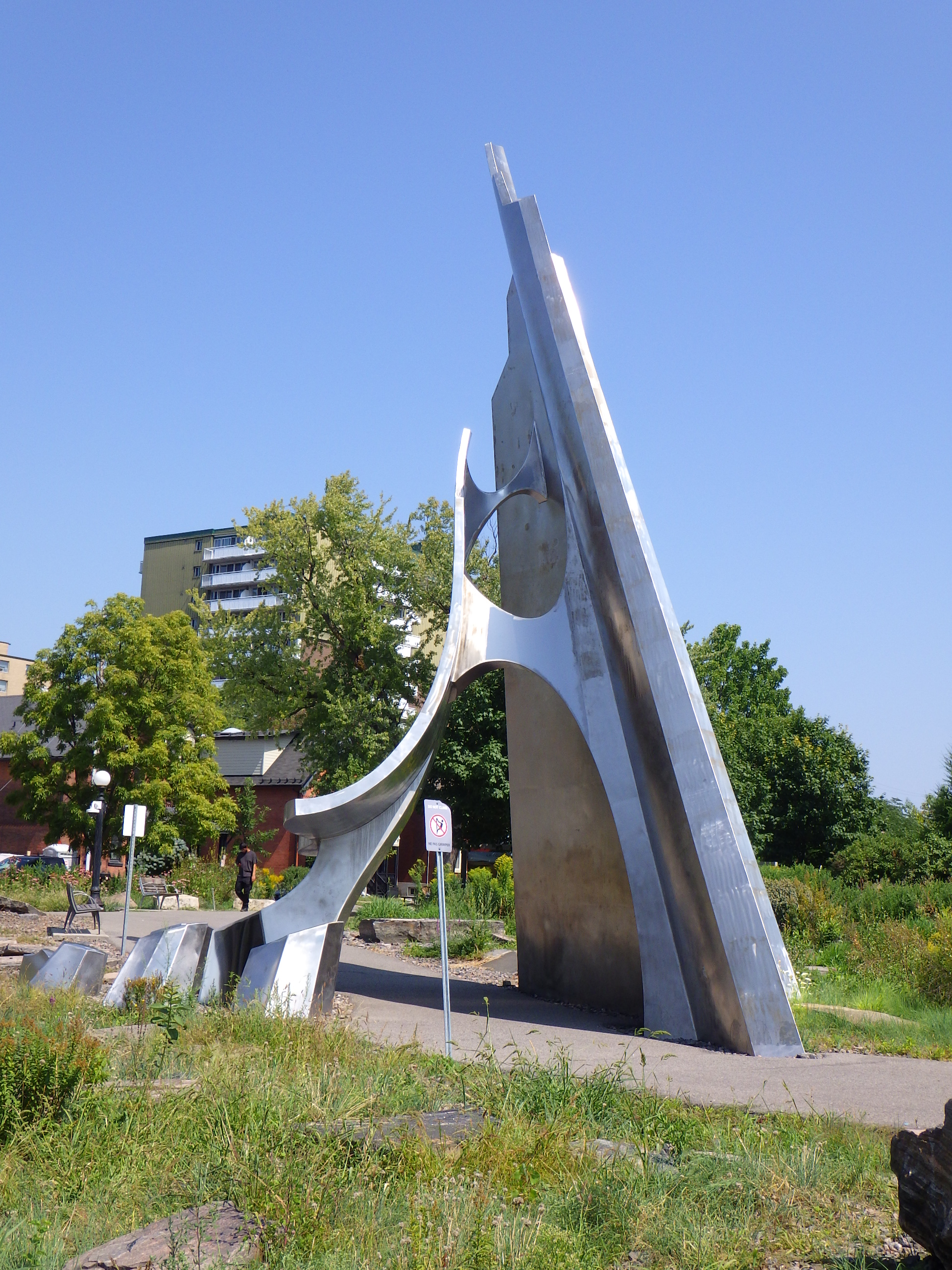
The Iceberg sculpture by Bill Lishman at the Canadian Museum of Nature, in Ottawa, Ontario, Canada

William Lishman (February 12, 1939 – December 30, 2017) was a Canadian sculptor, filmmaker, inventor, naturalist and public speaker, president of William Lishman & Associates Limited, Vice President of Paula Lishman Limited and Chair Emeritus of Operation Migration Inc. Described by the Toronto Star as a "dyslexic, colour-blind, wildly creative sculptor", he died less than two weeks after being diagnosed with leukemia.

== Aviation ==
Lishman was one of the pioneers of ultra-light aviation in Canada, and was the first Canadian to foot-launch and land a rigid-winged aircraft. In 1988, he became the first person to lead a flight of geese with an aircraft, and in 1993, the first to conduct an aircraft-led migration of birds.

His first aircraft was built in 1976, a combination of an Easy Riser hang-glider, a go-kart engine, and a propeller.

=== Work with geese ===
In the late 1980s, Lishman approached Bill Carrick, a naturalist who was working on imprinting on the behaviour of geese. Carrick provided goslings, who Bill and his children worked with daily, eventually doing twice-daily runs on a motorcycle with the geese flying with him, then switching to the ultra-light. In 1988, he became the first person to lead the flight of geese with an aircraft, and in 1993, the first to conduct an aircraft-led migration of birds.

==== Public attention ====
Lishman made a half-hour film for PBS, titled C'mon Geese, which was eventually sold internationally. ABC 20/20 filmed his October 1993 migration to Virginia, airing in November. It was followed up the next spring with a piece on the geese returning on their own. On air, Barbara Walters said that "in the 15-year history of 20/20, we've never had a greater response to any item."

After the first 20/20 story, Lishman was barraged with offers, many of which he found questionable. He chose Bruce Westwood of Westwood Creative Artists, then Canada's largest literary and entertainment agency, as his agent. Westwood's environmental consciousness appealed to Lishman. The story was chronicled in the autobiography Father Goose, published in three countries. Lishman's friend Scott Young, a writer, provided structural advice.

Westwood and Lishman met with movie studio representatives in Los Angeles, January 1994. They signed a deal with Sony Pictures and Columbia Pictures in February, worth $500,000 and a 5% royalty. The deal included a five-year option on creating an IMAX documentary. The resulting film was Fly Away Home (1996). As the studio couldn't insure actor Jeff Daniels for ultra-light flight, Lishman doubled as Tom Alden, the character based on Lishman himself. Aviation, the training of 60 geese for the production, and on-set goose-wrangling by the Lishman family and others, as well as six ultralight aircraft, were purchased by producers in a later contract worth $1.4 million. Weeks from the start of production, the Ontario team was told by the director to customize the aircraft to look like geese, requiring the sculpting of geese necks and heads.

The film took significant liberties with the Lishman story, replacing his sons with a daughter from New Zealand (Anna Paquin), who hasn't seen him since age 3. The mother is killed at the start of the film, and Lishman's character (Jeff Daniels) has a girlfriend (Dana Delany). Scenes set in North Carolina were also filmed in Canada.

The film earned a nomination for Best Cinematography at the 1996 Academy Awards

Deals for his autobiographical book Father Goose were signed in the summer of 1994, with Little, Brown Canada, Orion UK, and Crown USA, with advances totalling $300,000. Rights to companies in France, Germany, Japan, and Norway were signed as a result of attention at the 1994 Frankfurt Book Fair. Lishman worked on the manuscript during preparation for the film. This was followed by The Illustrated Father Goose, a children's book by Shelley Tanaka and Laurie McGaw. The book is told from daughter Carmen Lishman's point of view. In 1997, Lishman and his geese featured in a 49-minute VHS documentary called The Ultra Geese.

Lishman is also credited with inspiring the Jacques Perrin film Winged Migration.

=== Operation Migration ===
In 1994 he co-founded Operation Migration, Inc., and was its Chairperson until 2005. With Operation Migration he flew numerous migrations with geese and cranes, and in 2000 did the major path-finding for the route that has been used to establish the migration of the Whooping Crane between Wisconsin and Florida.

Lishman adopted eight sandhill cranes in spring 1995. Each had to be exercised, separately, for three hours daily, by a person wearing a crane puppet. Unlike the geese, if the cranes imprinted on a human, they would attack their own kind.

=== Rescue trike ===
By 2007, Lishman was in the second year of development and construction of an ultralight called a "rescue trike", meant to reduce the cost flying food and medical supplies into aid situations. Pilots would skim low to the ground, to release the 90-kilogram payload. The sled-shaped pod was designed by engineer and hang-glide pilot Paul Yarnall. The project was inspired by the slow response in less accessible areas of Central America, after Hurricane Mitch. The project was administered by Air First Aid, a new organization.

Lishman did little flying after 2007. In the Christmas 2015 report, he provided this update. "Working with David Woodhouse we continued on re working my Rescue Trike for the project I call Air First Aid Basically we built a new aircraft and used a few parts from the old one. Unfortunately my concept for using this type of aircraft for disaster relief still has not got off the ground but I keep gnawing a way forward with it. With that said I have lost my passion for flying and this year my total time in the air can only be measured in minutes. When I was flying with birds or photographing the Oak Ridge Moraine there was purpose to my flight but now they are both done. While I love the freedom and the spectacular visuals it is now a case of bin der and dun dat. Any one have idea what I can do with 3 perfectly good ultralight aircraft?"

== Artist ==
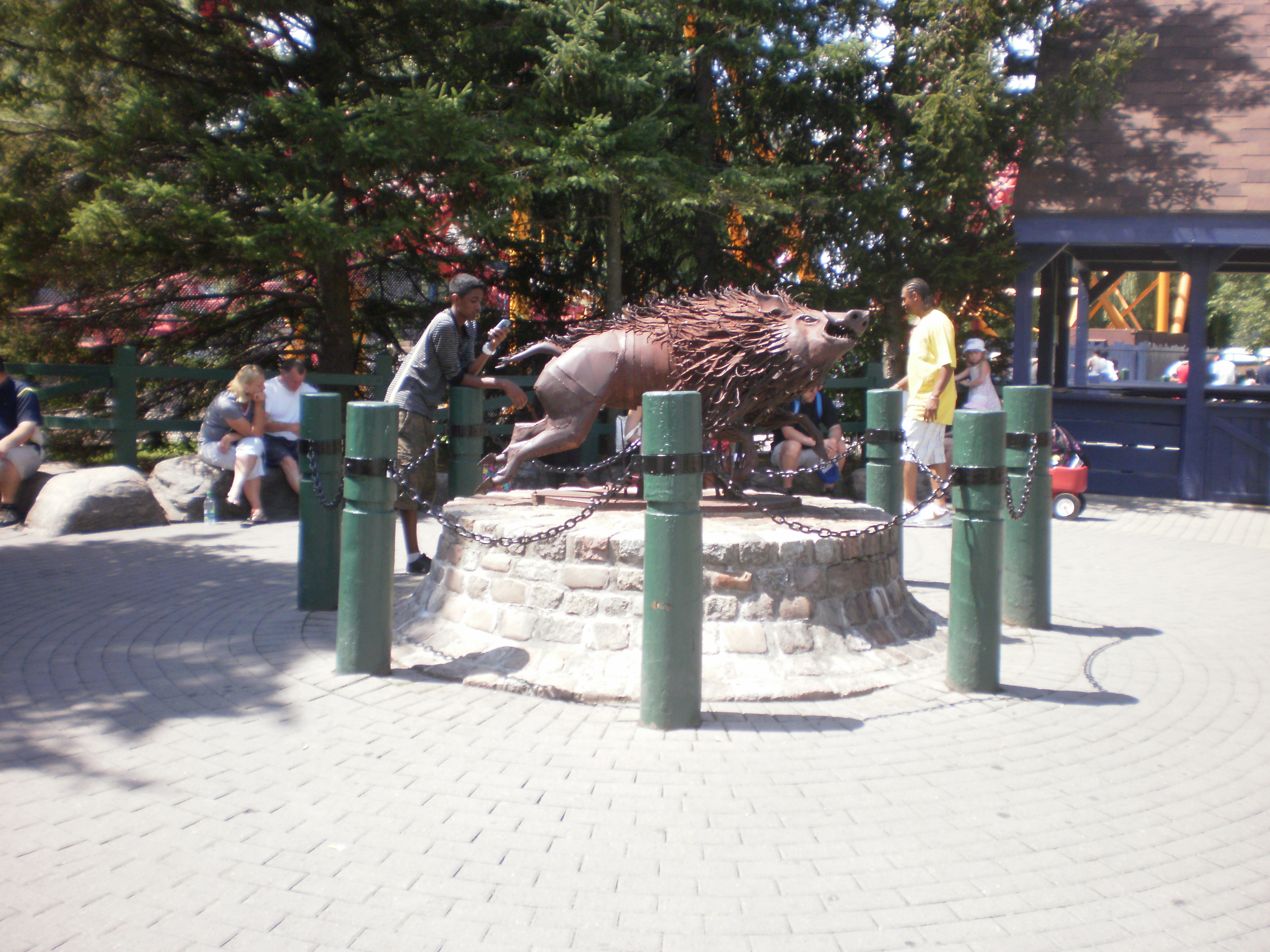
Lishman's Wilde Beast sculpture at the Wild Beast roller coaster, Canada's Wonderland theme park.

Lishman's career as a sculptor began in 1962. He became known for repurposing metal from existing items; a 1969 exhibition profile cites "It Could Have Gone Up" as including "a long slab of rusted metal which had once been part of an ancient threshing machine." The natural rust on his works were said to be "totally unlike man-made effects."

In 1966, he learned from craftsmen in a Mexican metalworking shop.

Lishman completed numerous public works of art, including a sculpture for The Vancouver World's Fair (EXPO '86) Transcending the traffic is a 85-foot-high, tower representing transportation. He later created AUTOHENGE a full-scale replica of Stonehenge made from crushed cars. He has also created 8 major wildlife pieces featured in the 3D IMAX film The Last Buffalo (1990), directed by Stephen Low.

Lishman created two sculptures for the Medieval Faire section of Canada's Wonderland, as well as some smaller works for buildings signage. They are a dragon, at the entrance to the Dragon Fire roller coaster, made with assistant Richard Van Heuvelen over two months, and the wild boar at Wild Beast. As of 2017, the sculptures remain at the park.

In 2015, his 13-metre-high (43 ft) stainless steel iceberg sculpture was installed at the Canadian Museum of Nature in Ottawa.

== Writing ==
In 2015 Lishman produced and self-published a coffee table book highlighting views of the Oak Ridges Moraine from Above which was its title. In December 2015, he wrote about this project. "We had the book launch here in the underground house on Earth Day April 22 and it all worked I have had great feed back on the book – And as of this date out of the 500 printed there are only about 50 left."

== Personal life ==
As a child, Lishman lived on a dairy farm in Pickering. Lishman's father was a dairy farmer, said to be "handy with machinery", and his mother, raised as a Quaker, had a master's degree in biology from the University of Toronto. She would teach her children about the species around the farm pond. The farm had domesticated geese, who struggled in the autumn with the urge to migrate. Lishman did not finish high school and described himself as "unencumbered by formal education". He was prevented from joining the Air Force, when a partial colour blindness was discovered.

He lived in Blackstock with his wife Paula Lishman, a fashion designer and president of the Fur Council of Canada. They married in 1968. The Lishmans have two sons, Geordie Lishman and Aaron, and one daughter, Carmen.

Lishman was an omnivore, and would eat "trouble makers" among the Canada geese.

In 2005 he hosted an episode of the Canadian Broadcasting Corporation documentary series The Nature Of Things on the topic of renewable energy.

In 2000 the Canadian government awarded him the Meritorious Service Medal for bringing honour to Canada for his pioneering work with migratory birds. Lishman was also a recipient of The US National Wildlife Federation 2002 Conservation award, numerous international awards for films, and the Odyssey of the Mind award for Creativity which he shares with the likes of Walt Disney and Neil Armstrong. He also holds two honorary doctorates.

For ten years Lishman presented over 50 keynote speeches to various organizations around the world and was the guest speaker on 20 adventure expeditions on small cruise ships to remote parts of the planet, including both polar regions.

Starting in 2015, Lishman and his wife began to share a rented home near Oaxaca, Mexico with another couple for six weeks in the winter.

=== Lishman family home, Purple Hill ===
The Lishman family lived in a 1970s pre-fabricated wooden Viceroy cottage. In 1988, Lishman built a new home in the top of a hill on the same property, in an effort to reduce the exterior repair of structures, and reduce the energy used in heating, by removing direct contact with the wind.

The resulting 2,600 square foot structure, described as an "underground home with igloo-like domes ... overlooking the Purple Woods valley and Lake Scugog", includes six circular rooms, made from onion-shaped steel domes covered in steel squared netting, metal lath, sprayed inside with a layer of concrete. Lishman compared the structure to that of molehills, and media outlets have compared it to a Hobbit hole. Cooled in the summer by the dirt, it is heated during the winter by ground water. It has a round refrigerator that rises from the counter through pneumatics, custom cabinets and door-hinges, and domed skylights.

The house was named Purple Hill, for the viper's bugloss plants, which would flower each summer, on the over 1000 tonnes of earth covering the house. It cost about $400,000 to build in 1988. Lishman once talked to an American mobile-home builder about how his underground method would protect against tornadoes. Producers of the movie Fly Away Home used Lishman's property for filming, but not his house, believing that it would hurt the credibility of the film.

== Inventions ==
Lishman was a prolific inventor, often creating bespoke technology to suit his unconventional lifestyle and humanitarian goals.

- Pneumatic Refrigerator: Designed for his underground home where standard appliances were impractical, Lishman invented a circular, pop-up refrigeration unit. The appliance sat entirely below the kitchen island and used a pneumatic (compressed air) lift to raise the shelving unit through the countertop. This design was noted for its energy efficiency; because cold air is heavier than warm air, the chest-style configuration prevented cold air from "spilling" out as it does with traditional vertical doors.
- Rescue Trike: Under his "Air First Aid" initiative, Lishman developed a specialized ultralight aircraft (or "trike") intended for disaster relief. The aircraft was designed to carry a 90-kilogram payload in a sled-shaped pod, allowing pilots to deliver food and medical supplies to remote areas by skimming low to the ground and releasing the pod at low speeds to minimize impact.
- Ferrocement Dome Construction: Lishman pioneered a "mole-hill" method of underground architecture to build his home, "Purple Hill." He used custom-welded rebar trusses to form igloo-like domes, which were covered in metal lath and sprayed with shotcrete before being buried under 1,000 tonnes of earth. This method provided natural climate control and protection from extreme weather.
- Rigid-Wing Ultralight: In 1978, Lishman became the first Canadian to successfully foot-launch and land a powered rigid-wing aircraft. He modified an "Easy Riser" hang-glider by adding a go-kart engine and a hand-carved wooden propeller, a precursor to the aircraft later used to lead bird migrations.

=== Death and legacy ===
Lishman died at his home and his son Aaron said that "his passing was peaceful, surrounded by family and friends. Thankfully he did not suffer long." The cause of death was not stated by the family. A Book of Memories was provided to the family by the Newcastle Funeral Home. "Most people that lived anywhere near him will remember him flying over with a flock of geese behind him. That was a common sight in the late eighties and early nineties. He'll be remembered for a lot of different things but mostly for being an innovator and someone who wasn't afraid to try new things", Aaron Lishman added.

In 2013, Lishman described himself as essentially a sculptor in an interview. "I got fired from everything else ... I wanted to be a pilot but I'm colour blind and dyslexic. The air force didn't want me to be a pilot. I'd be deadly."

Actor Jeff Daniels provided this comment to the Toronto Star for the obituary: "Prior to shooting Fly Away Home, I'd always consider myself a creative spirit but when I met Bill, I found someone even more creative, even more alive, even more imaginative. He taught me a lot about what it means to be a true artist and it was an honour playing him".

== See also ==
- Human-guided migration
