= Aransas National Wildlife Refuge =

National Wildlife Refuge in Texas, US

- IUCN category IV (habitat/species management area)
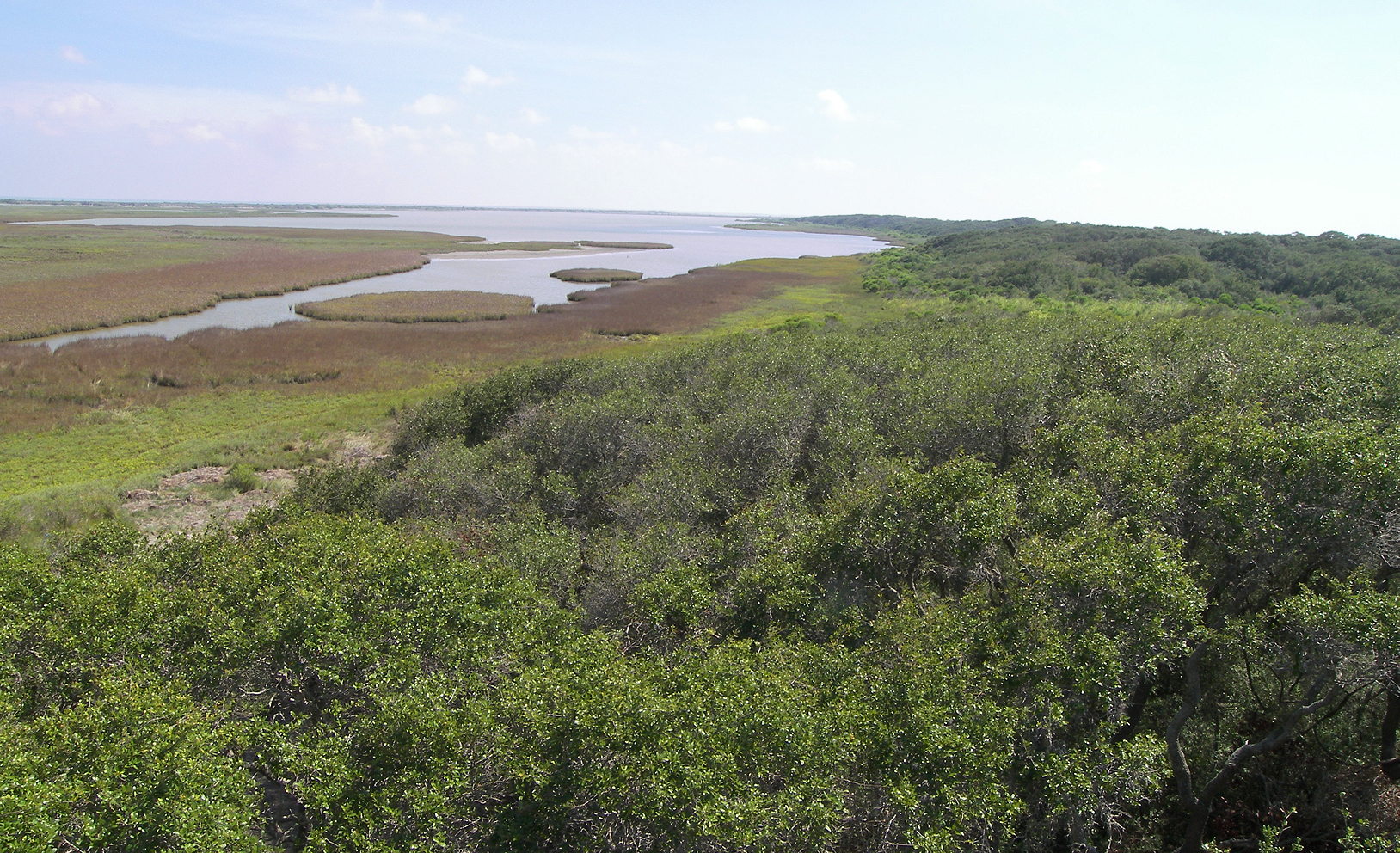
- Wetlands at Aransas National Wildlife Refuge looking out from the 40 ft observation tower.

- Location within Texas Location within the United States
- Location: Aransas, Calhoun, Refugio counties, Texas, United States
- Nearest city: Austwell, Texas
- Coordinates: 28°16′00″N 96°49′00″W
- Area: 115,324 acres (466.70 km^{2})
- Established: 1937
- Governing body: U.S. Fish and Wildlife Service
- Website: Aransas National Wildlife Refuge

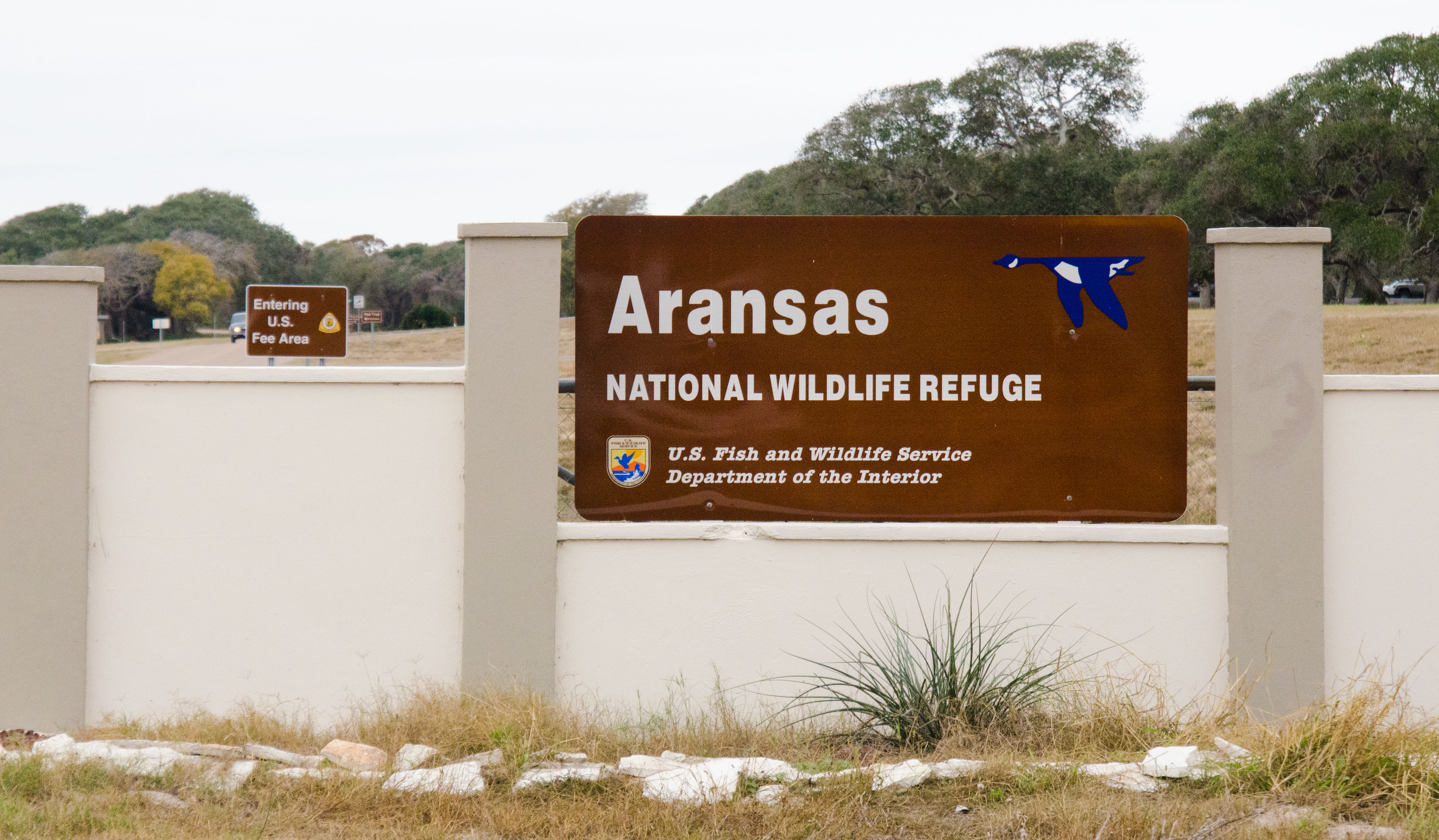

Aransas National Wildlife Refuge is a 115,324-acre (466.7 km^{2}) protected area situated on the southwest side of San Antonio Bay along the Gulf Coast of the U.S. state of Texas. It is located in parts of Aransas, Refugio, and Calhoun Counties. It is situated on the southwest side of the San Antonio Bay, formed by the mouth of the Guadalupe River. It also includes nearly the entirety of Matagorda Island, a 38-mile barrier island. The Aransas National Wildlife Refuge was established by Executive Order 7784 on 31 December 1937 by President Franklin D. Roosevelt as the Aransas Migratory Waterfowl Refuge as a refuge and breeding ground for migratory birds and other wildlife. Roosevelt issued a proclamation in 1940 changing the name to the Aransas National Wildlife Refuge.

In October 1938, Civilian Conservation Corps Company 880 established camp south of Austwell, Texas. They built roads, ditches, firebreaks, and the residence facilities for the refuge. They constructed part of the spillway for Burgentine Lake, which serves as a major resting area for migratory waterfowl. They also graded the road to Austwell.

Bird life includes ducks, herons, egrets, ibises, roseate spoonbills, and the endangered whooping crane, whose population has recovered significantly since the 1940s.

Other fauna include American alligators, collared peccaries, snakes, and bobcats, which inhabit the refuge's grasslands, blackjack oak thickets, freshwater ponds, and marshes.

== Administration ==
The Aransas National Wildlife Refuge is divided into five units, with two being contiguous and three being disconnected from the original Aransas unit. The Aransas Unit and Tatton Unit are located on the mainland, with the Aransas Unit being the original section of the refuge. The Aransas and Tatton Units are 47,261 acres and 7,568 acres, respectively. The Lamar and Myrtle Foester Whitmire Units are 979 acres and 3,440 acres, respectively. The largest unit is the Matagorda Island unit, with 56,683 acres. In its entirety, the refuge consists of 115,324 acres, and is the largest Fish and Wildlife Service protected area in the state of Texas.

== See also ==
- Great Texas Coastal Birding Trail
- Wildlife refuge
