= Robert Katona =

American artist (born 1947)

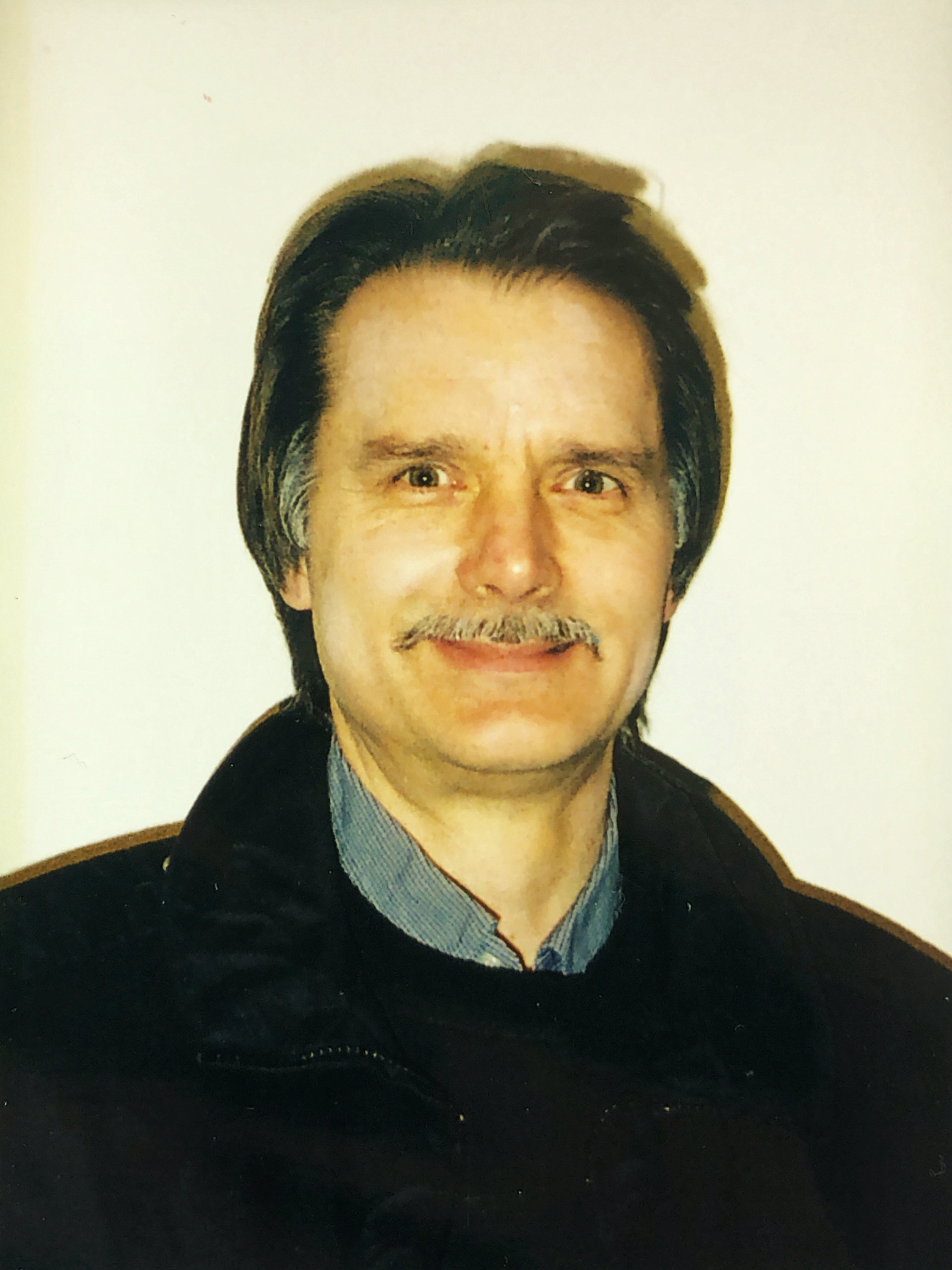
- Born: 1947 (age 78–79); Ohio, U.S.
- Known for: Flow Painting, Computer Art
- Style: Surrealism; Techism
- Website: robertkatona.com

Robert Katona (born 1947) is known for developing the flow painting technique and creating a form of computer art, Techism.

== Early life ==
Katona was born in Ohio in 1947. His father, a sociology professor, moved his family to Colorado shortly after Robert was born. Both of his parents were teachers and provided the intellectual stimulus for him to develop quickly as an artist. He began to draw at age 2 and turned to art as a full time profession after attending the University of Colorado.

He is a falconer and has trained and flown many species of raptors including the peregrine falcon. His knowledge of birds of prey has led to illustration contributions to the Raptor Research Foundation and the North American Falconers Association.

== Career ==
Katona first developed a realist technique by working from old masters and depicting still lives. While experimenting with abstract art, he created a unique combination of abstract expressionism and figurative art, calling the technique flow painting.

His method uses liquid acrylic poured onto canvas, creating a dynamic expanding composition. When the paint is dry, Katona studies the color field and looks for shapes and images that suggest a theme. He then paints these visions into the background with startling precision. Deliberate distortion of the image blends with the flowing colors to create a painting of surprising contrast.

In New York he invented a form of computer art, Techism, with colored plexiglass and electronics. He achieved an artificial look with a computer art that goes beyond printouts or photographs. For him plexiglass was a suitable material in the way it mimics the computer screen, and the colors are electric and fluorescent.

Based on computer generated images, executed on a large scale in plastic, Katona's compositions give material form to the cosmos of the computer screen. He merges technology and imagination to make an illusory world actual, a cunning reversal of computerized dematerialization.

Angus Cameron of Alfred Knopf Publishing described the pencil drawings for the book, Golden Eagle Country, as “stunning and sensationally beautiful”. Barbara Haddad of the Denver Post wrote of his “remarkable drawing” done “with an incredibly sensitive hand.”

Elizabeth Exler of Manhattan Arts reviewed Computerworks as an “incredibly thought-provoking exhibition, and each work is as fascinating as the next.” Ed MaCormack of New York Artspeak described Techism: Art of the 21st Century: “In these and other pieces in this dazzling, highly entertaining solo exhibition, Robert Katona creates powerful metaphors for the technological dilemma of computerized civilization.”

His versatility as an artist has gained Katona a worldwide reputation, including an award from the Society of Illustrators in New York for his work in Golden Eagle Country. His art appears in collections: Willie Nelson, John Denver, former U.S. Senator Gary Hart, the Air Force Academy, and the Royal Family of Saudi Arabia, and in museums: Museum of Art, Munich, Taipei Museum of Art, Fine Arts Museum of Long Island, NY, and the Biennal in Barcelona, Spain. Katona lives with his wife and two children in Colorado.
