= Operation Falcon =

Operation Falcon may refer to:

- Operation FALCON, a number of 2006 dragnet operations by the United States Marshals Service
- Operation Falcon, a 1984 sting operation against US falconers conducted by the US Fish and Wildlife Service
- Operation Falcon, an Indian troop airlift operation along the Sino-Indian frontier in the Assam Himalayan region.
