= Frank Beebe =

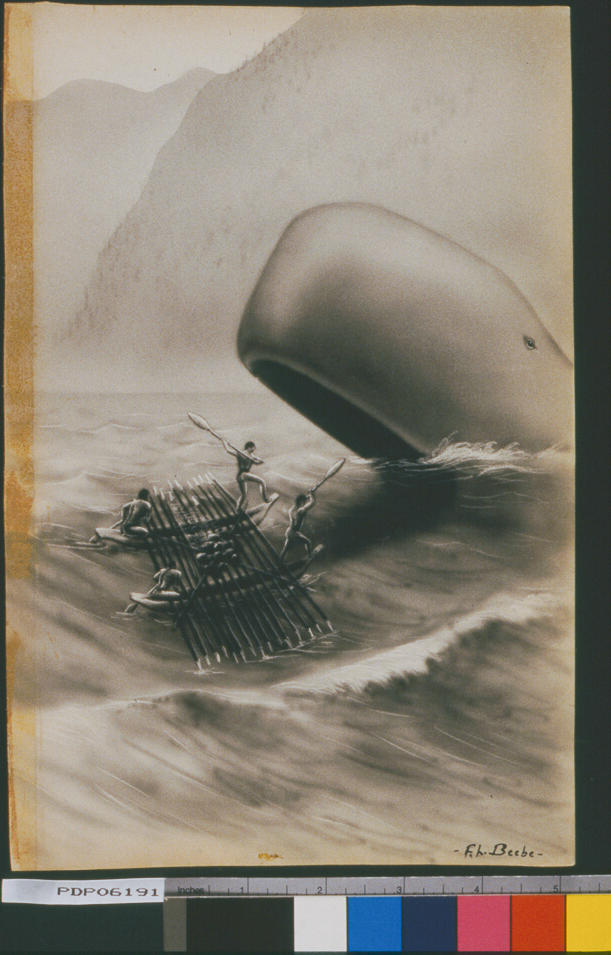
Frank Beebe, Quawteah Destroys Kla-Kla-Look

Frank Lyman Beebe (1914 – 15 November 2008) was a falconer, writer and wildlife illustrator from Canada. He was also an illustrator and exhibit designer for the Provincial Museum in British Columbia.

He founded the North American Falconers Association with Harold Webster.

== Published works ==
- Frank L. Beebe. A Falconry Manual. Surrey, B.C.: Hancock House, 2017. ISBN 978-0-88839-978-6
- Frank L. Beebe. Compleat Falconer. Surrey, B.C.: Hancock House, 1992. ISBN 978-0-88839-253-4
- Frank L. Beebe. Frank Beebe the Artist. Surrey, B.C.: Hancock House, 1992. ISBN 0-88839-256-7
