= Operation Falcon (USFWS operation) =

Undercover operation by USFWS

Operation Falcon was an undercover operation conducted by the US Fish and Wildlife Service (USFWS) and the Canadian Wildlife Service from 1982–1984. The investigation into the illegal sale of federally protected birds resulted in 63 people being tried or taking a plea bargain. Of the cases that went to trial, there were 5 acquittals, 5 felony convictions, 44 misdemeanor convictions and 1 civil conviction. Jeff McPartlin, a falconer who was reported to be integral to the operation, received the Monitor award for his work. He was later ejected from the North American Falconers Association because officials from the group felt "the man had deceived people". Many falconers were upset at the tactics used during the investigation and felt that the sting inappropriately targeted bystanders rather than professional long term smugglers.
