= Abu Dhabi Falcon Hospital =

Veterinary hospital in Abu Dhabi

Geography
- Location: P.O.Box: 45553, Abu Dhabi, United Arab Emirates
- Coordinates: 24°24′27″N 54°41′55″E

Organisation
- Care system: Veterinary
- Type: Specialist

Services
- Speciality: Falconry

History
- Founded: 1999

Links
- Website: www.falconhospital.com
- Lists: Hospitals in United Arab Emirates

The Abu Dhabi Falcon Hospital (ADFH) is the first public medical institution exclusively for falcons in the United Arab Emirates. Established by Environment Agency – Abu Dhabi and opened on 3 October 1999, Abu Dhabi Falcon Hospital has become the largest falcon hospital in the UAE and in the world with a patient influx of approximately 11,000 falcons per year. The ADFH describes their mission as a goal "To protect, conserve, research, and promote captive-bred and wild falcons health, wildlife, and falconry tradition. To lead efforts of Abu Dhabi government to improve and protect animal welfare and to increase awareness and responsibility of people for animal welfare as the leading center for animal healthcare and welfare in Abu Dhabi Emirate."

== History ==
Since its founding, the ADFH has expanded to include opportunities for education, training, and research. In 2006, ADFH became a specialized hospital that accepts a variety of bird and poultry species, and in 2007, ADFH launched a tourism program. 2007 also marked the opening of the ADFH Pet Care Center with facilities for cats and dogs. In 2010, the Abu Dhabi Falcon Hospital was put in charge to manage the newly founded Abu Dhabi Animal Shelter upon the decision of the Abu Dhabi Executive Council. ADFH is also the only authorized veterinary hospital in the Abu Dhabi Emirate to conduct the neutering for the TNR (Trap-Neuter-Run) program of the Abu Dhabi Emirate. ADFH started its own falcon breeding center in 2011.

== Description ==
The hospital has individual air-conditioned rooms for over 200 birds. Each year about 11,000 falcons enter its care. The hospital offers general veterinary services, health examinations, endoscopy procedures, surgical services, an ophthalmology unit, and a 24-hour emergency hotline. The general services offered at ADFH include implanting passive integrated transponder (PIT) microchips, talon or beak coping, applying tailmounts, imping feathers, quarantining for contagious birds, and the issuing of medical reports on the conditions of avian patients. Health exams include both routine check-ups and sample testing to identify possible health issues or infections. The ADFH also introduced pre-purchase examinations in 2004 to screen falcons for diseases and other problems before the falcons are purchased. In terms of surgical services, the hospital is equipped to perform soft-tissue (for cases such as keel injuries or bumble foot surgery) and complex fracture or dislocation operations. Sick falcons are kept in the in-patient wards at the hospital to be treated and monitored. The life expectancy of falcons that get treated at ADFH increases from 12 to 15 years up to 18 to 20 years on average.

The examinations generally take place in large rooms where minor procedures such as applying bandages or imping can take place. Advanced procedures including endoscopy or surgery occur in the two modern operation theatres. There is a separate unit equipped with thermal cautery tools among other methods for treating Falcon Pox.

ADFH is also involved in doing research into falcon medicine and offers a training program for veterinary students specializing in falcon medicine. Two new diseases have been discovered through the ADFH research endeavors. One is a parasitic disease, Enteroctozoon bieneusi, and the other is a bacterial infection, Acinteobacter baumannii. The training program facilitates practices such as diagnosis, anesthesia, imping, wound treatment, and clinical sampling. Trainees work alongside veterinarians and technicians while also attending lectures. At the end of an internship or training program, the participants undergo examinations to obtain official documentation for their experience.

== Passports ==
Ever since the United Arab Emirates introduced falcon passports it is the ADFH's prerogative to issue them.

== Animal Shelter ==
The Abu Dhabi Falcon Hospital manages the Abu Dhabi Animal Shelter (ADAS), which was established April 2010, and the treatment of cats and dogs at the shelter is provided by the hospital's Pet Care Center. This is based on the approval of the Abu Dhabi Executive Council of the Abu Dhabi government. The facility can accommodate hundreds of stray dogs and cats. In June 2010, ADFH began to neuter all feral cats and dogs as part of the TNR program. The animal shelter has catteries and kennels where cats and dogs that can be rehomed are kept for adoption. If a cat cannot be rehomed, it is returned to where it was found after being neutered. The ADAS is located between the Abu Dhabi International Airport and Al Shamkha.
