= Lure (falconry) =

Mechanism used in falconry

A lure is an object used in falconry, usually made of leather with a pair of bird wings or feathers attached. It is often an effigy of a prey species or preferred quarry. A falconer swings the lure round and round on a cord for the falcon to chase for exercise. There are at least three types of lure-flying: short line, long line and pole luring. A lure also may be used as an object to call the falcon, hawk or eagle to return.

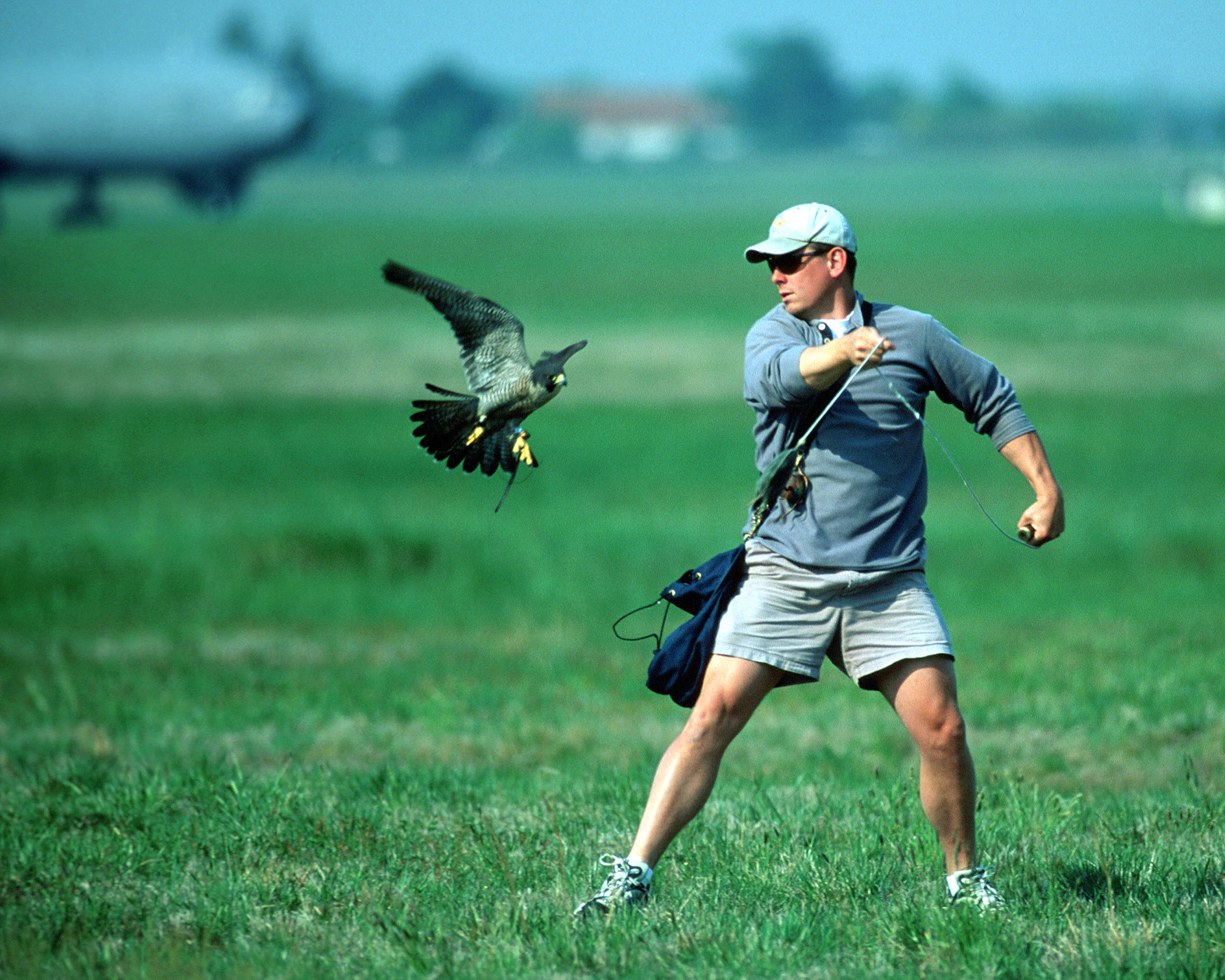
A short lure

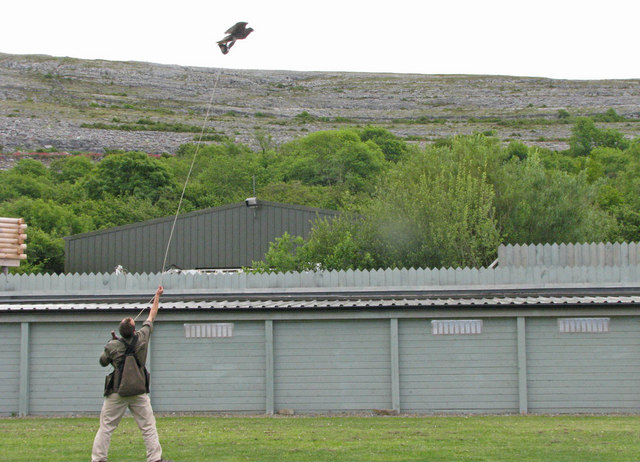
Bird taking a meat lure

Falcon sitting on a lure
