= Imping =

Practice used to fix broken feathers of a bird

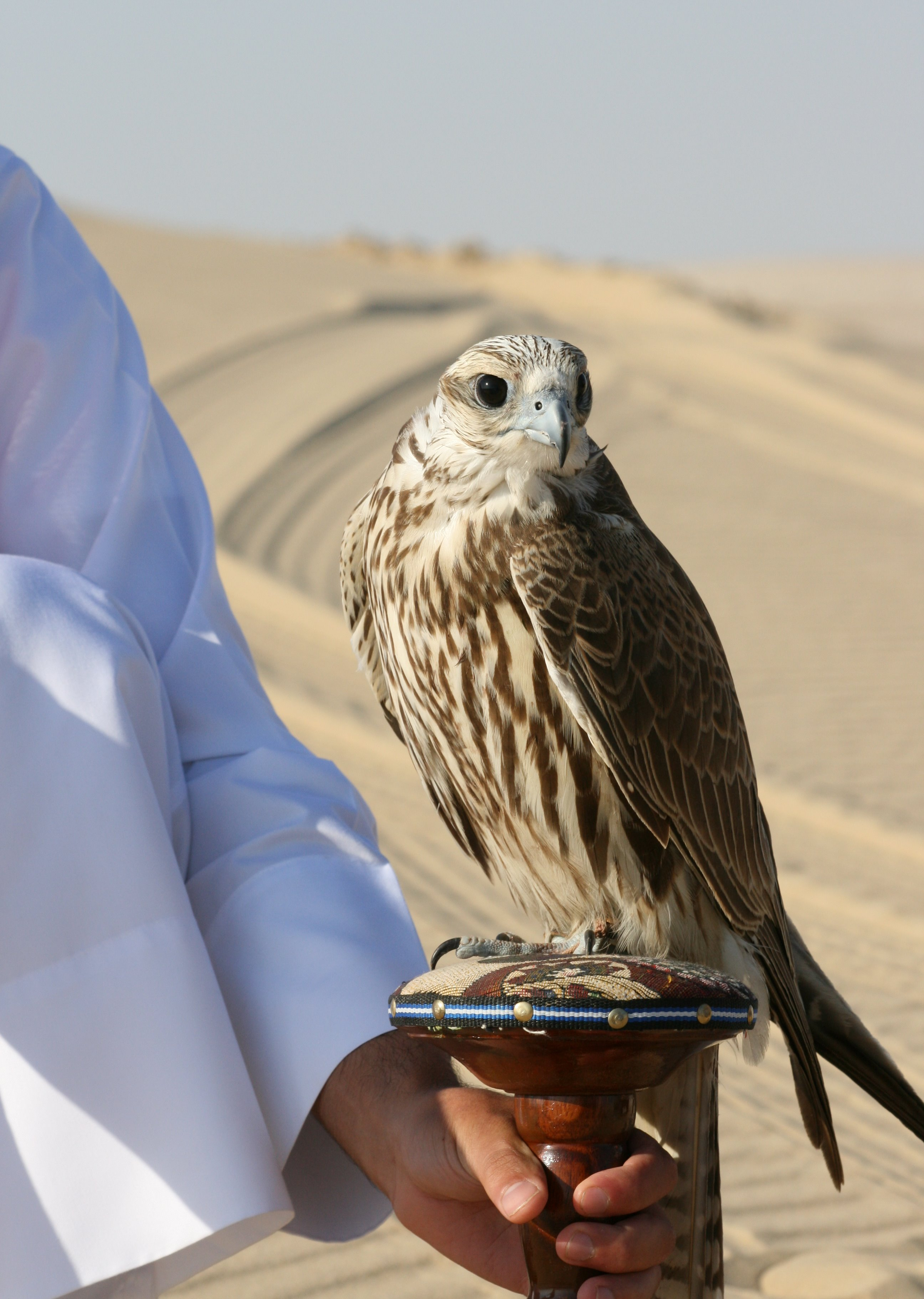
A saker falcon used for falconry purposes in Qatar. Imping is often practiced in falconry.

Imping is the practice of replacing a broken feather of a bird with another one, referred to as a donor feather, from a previous molt of the same animal or from another animal of the same or of a different species. Imping is mostly done on birds of prey (specially falcons used for falconry), although it is also applied on seabirds, corvids and other types of birds on rehabilitation centers. It is not painful for birds, since feathers are dead structures made of keratin, which is what human hair and nails are made of. Imping is only possible in partially broken or damaged feathers, not in feathers that have fallen off completely, and is only used for flight feathers on the wing and for rectrices (feathers of the tail). It also can not be applied on blood feathers (developing feathers) until they are fully grown and do not have a blood supply within them anymore.

Imping is done by adding a small so-called imping needle within both the shaft of the remaining part of the broken feather and the shaft of its new replacement with the help of adhesive. In the past, bamboo and metal were used as imping needles, and rust was used as a bonding agent. Today, imping needles are commonly made of fiberglass or graphite and epoxy is used as adherent. After some time, the imped feather will naturally molt out and a new one will grow in its place. Imping can help a wild bird that would otherwise have to remain a considerable period in care until a new healthy feather is grown. However, imping requires precision and skill, as an incorrectly imped feather can cause bruising and irritation and affect the bird after its release, potentially even becoming detrimental to its own survival.

Imping is an ancient practice, and the earliest document where it is mentioned is in the Holy Roman Emperor Frederick II's book The Art of Falconry (originally in Latin), where he uses the term imponere ("to fix" or "to place upon") to refer to it. The English writer William Shakespeare also made a reference to imping on his play Richard II, where a noble incites his companions to rebel against the king to "imp out our drooping country's broken wing".
