= Takagari =

Japanese falconry

Takagari (鷹狩) is Japanese falconry, a sport of the noble class, and a symbol of their nobility, their status, and their warrior spirit.

== History ==
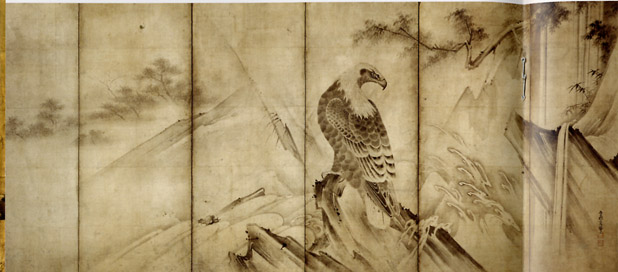
Soga Nichokuan's "Eagle on a Rock" ink on paper, c. 1624–44

In Japan, records indicate that falconry from Continental Asia began in the fourth century. According to a passage in the Nihon Shoki (720), continental falconry was introduced by the Baekje noble Sakenokimi in 359 during the reign of Emperor Nintoku. From the outset, the central Court and local lords both enjoyed hawking, with the former trying to monopolize falconry, sometimes with banning orders. Central power, however, as seen in the repetition of prohibiting orders, had no complete control over local falconry until the 17th century. In the 13th century, hawking became popular among the rising samurai class as well as among court nobles (kuge). At that time, the practice of hawking was a means of resolving struggles over land ownership among lords. Buddhist temples, who were also land owners, opposed falconry based on their ideology against killing. Falconer lords, on the other hand, devised a Buddhist rationale or resorted to Shinto justifications. Several falconry schools or styles (ryū) were formed in the process.

The falconry methods employed in Japan had originally been Sino-Korean ones. Based on Chinese texts and practice, Shinshū Yōkyō was edited in 818 as a falconry textbook. From the 13th century on, nobles left falconry texts as evidence of their authority in falconry. The establishment of the Ashikaga shogunate in Kyoto allowed mutual influence between kuge and samurai on the development of the sport. Samurai falconers also began to write falconry texts in the 16th century.

The sport had always been a status symbol, as a very expensive pastime, involving not only the rarity and cost of the haggards, passages and eyasses, and the costs of housing, raising, and training them, but it also required access to a large amount of space, and a lot of time and effort, things presumably denied to all but the most fortunate of the common classes. With the opening of the Tokugawa period, the wars of the Sengoku period came to an end, and falconry became one of the primary outlets for the militaristic energies of the samurai class, along with archery, swordplay, and horse racing.

Tokugawa Ieyasu enjoyed falconry very much himself, and used it as a symbol of his authority, and of his plans for the country, transforming the violence of his conquest into a peacetime system of laws. He banned traditional falconry by kuge, who had been holders of the art since the first introduction of falconry. He established restrictions on which ranks of creatures a samurai or daimyō (feudal lord) could hunt, from geese and ducks up to the more valuable swans. He also set up certain lands as takaba (鷹場), or falconry fields; practicing the sport on all other lands was forbidden. Many of these designated lands were farmers' lands; the peasant farmers were forced to provide labor for the hunt, which often took days or even weeks, and were forbidden from interfering with the prey creatures of their lands, despite the damage geese and other animals might do to crops.

Goshawks, and other birds of prey, increasingly became symbols of status, and in the early Edo period, many paintings were commissioned by samurai. While the first images of hawks and eagles in Japan appeared in the 13th century, since the 14th and 15th centuries, paintings with hawks as the main subject appeared, under the influence of imported Chinese paintings. As the visibility and popularity of falconry grew, at the beginning of the Edo period, images of the hunt, of mews, of wild birds of prey, and even portraits of favored individual birds were increasingly commissioned. While common people were kept out of falconry, their interest in it gave rise to some ukiyo-e art by Hokusai, Hiroshige and Kawanabe Kyōsai.

Falconry flourished throughout the Edo period, with only a short interruption imposed by Tokugawa Tsunayoshi. With the Meiji Revolution, the monopoly on falconry by samurai ended. Falconry was released to the public, but in the process of modernization, its prosperity faded. While the Imperial Household Ministry gathered ex-falconers and tried to keep their tradition, some methods were lost, and others were handed down to private enthusiasts. Hawk-eagle austringers in northeastern Japan have also emerged in the process, although their origin is somewhat uncertain.

After World War II, the Imperial Household Agency suspended the practice of hawking, and the tradition of takagari is today kept by clubs formed by enthusiasts.
