= Car hawking =

Modern technique in falconry

Car hawking, or drive-by falconry is a modern falconry technique which relies upon the use of a motor car or other motor vehicle as a base from which to hunt wild quarry species with a trained raptor.

Typically, the falconer will drive around in a car, slowly, seeking suitable small game in the immediate vicinity of the road. Once an appropriate target has been selected, the raptor is then slipped from the window of the moving vehicle as it passes by in order that it might engage with its prey.

Car hawking provides an advantage over more traditional methods of falconry in that the hawk is already moving at a considerable speed, with added momentum upon exiting the vehicle and as the car acts as cover, it has an enormous element of surprise over the quarry, giving it little or no time to react and potentially escape. Numerous videos exist on the internet of people successfully utilizing this method, flying Harris hawks, goshawks and other small raptors such as American Kestrels against feral pigeons and corvids in both urban and rural areas.

Car hawking can be dangerous for the bird and the driver. Passing cars or pets can cause injuries while the bird is focused on its prey. A distracted driver may cause an accident, so a designated driver is recommended.

Legality of this practice varies by location and protected status of the quarry. In some states it is considered as "hunting from a motor vehicle" and thus against the law. Some falconers consider car hawking to be unsporting.
