= North American Falconers Association =

Falconry organization

The North American Falconers Association (NAFA) is a falconry organization composed primarily of falconers.

Founded in 1961 by Hal Webster, Frank Beebe (the authors of "North American Falconry And Hunting Hawks") and other prominent falconers of the time, NAFA is a not-for-profit private association formed to:

- Provide communication among, and to disseminate information to, interested members.
- Promote scientific study of the raptorial species, their care, welfare and training.
- Promote conservation of the birds of prey and an appreciation of their value in nature and in wildlife conservation programs.
- Urge recognition of falconry as a legal field sport.
- Establish traditions which will aid, perpetuate and further the welfare of falconry and the raptors it uses.

NAFA hosts an annual meet. The location varies (generally tending to be in the Western half of the US), but is generally held during the week of Thanksgiving, in late November.
