= Newberry Township =

Newberry Township may refer to the following townships in the United States:

- Newberry Township, Miami County, Ohio
- Newberry Township, Pennsylvania
