= Franklin Township, Darke County, Ohio =

Township in Ohio, US

- Township
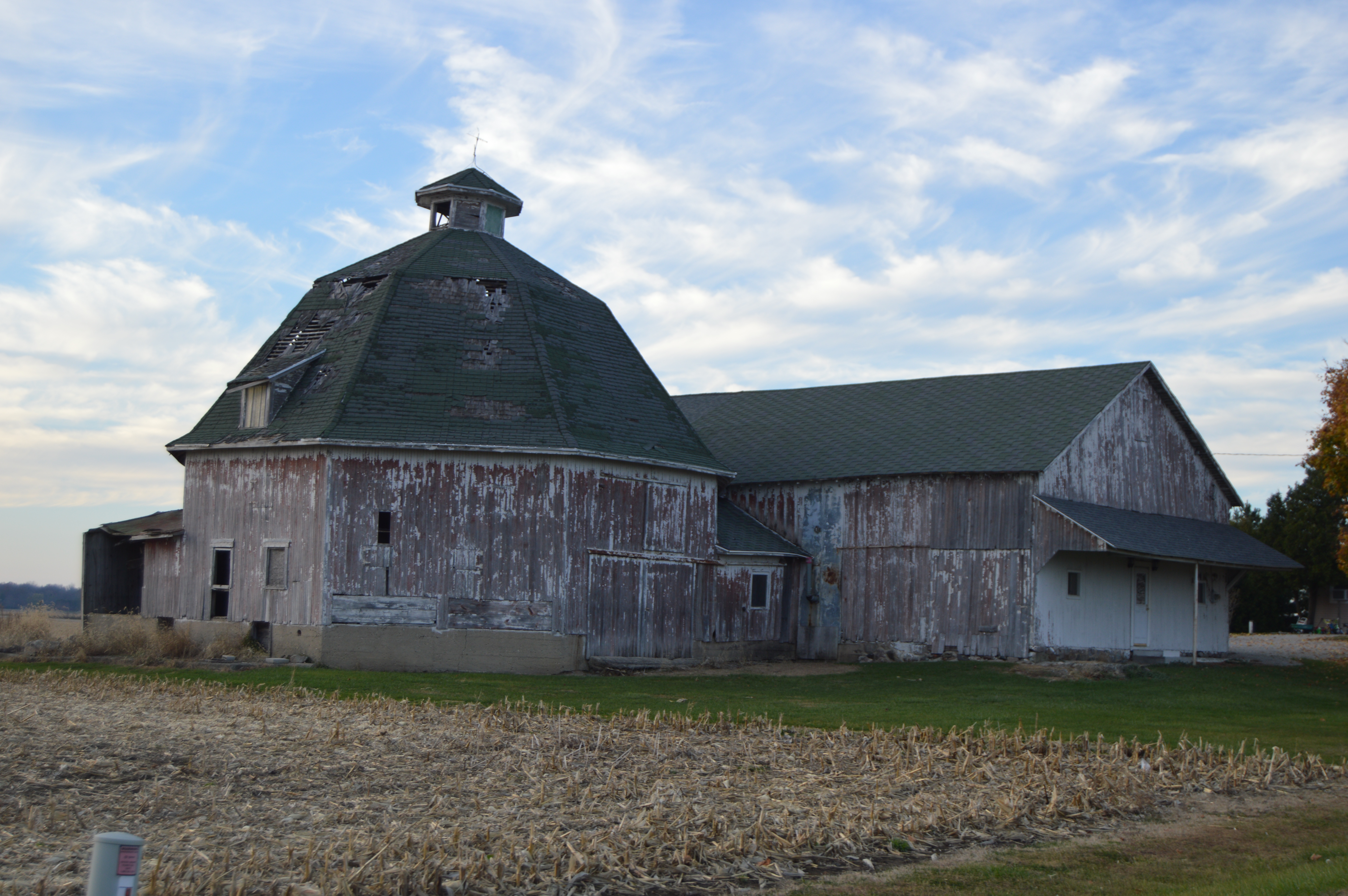
- Round barn south of Gettysburg

- Location in Darke County and the state of Ohio.
- Coordinates: 40°3′8″N 84°28′17″W
- Country: United States
- State: Ohio
- County: Darke

Area
  - Total: 25.2 sq mi (65.3 km^{2})
  - Land: 25.2 sq mi (65.3 km^{2})
  - Water: 0 sq mi (0.0 km^{2})
- Elevation: 994 ft (303 m)

Population (2020)
  - Total: 1,210
  - Density: 48.0/sq mi (18.5/km^{2})
- Time zone: UTC-5 (Eastern (EST))
  - Summer (DST): UTC-4 (EDT)
- FIPS code: 39-28266
- GNIS feature ID: 1086013

Franklin Township is one of the twenty townships of Darke County, Ohio, United States. The 2020 census found 1,210 people in the township.

== Geography ==
Located in the southeastern part of the county, it borders the following townships:

- Adams Township - north
- Newberry Township, Miami County - northeast corner
- Newton Township, Miami County - east
- Monroe Township - south
- Twin Township - southwest corner
- Van Buren Township - west

No municipalities are located in Franklin Township.

== Name and history ==
Franklin Township was established in 1839, and named for the printer and statesman Benjamin Franklin. It is one of twenty-one Franklin Townships statewide.

== Government ==
The township is governed by a three-member board of trustees, who are elected in November of odd-numbered years to a four-year term beginning on the following January 1. Two are elected in the year after the presidential election and one is elected in the year before it. There is also an elected township fiscal officer, who serves a four-year term beginning on April 1 of the year after the election, which is held in November of the year before the presidential election. Vacancies in the fiscal officership or on the board of trustees are filled by the remaining trustees.
