= Economy of Lexington, Kentucky =

The economy of Lexington, Kentucky was shaped by its considerable distance from any major navigable rivers. As a landlocked city, it did not develop the heavy industry that often developed in cities like Cincinnati or Pittsburgh. To counter this, Lexington put forth an effort to stay at the forefront of modern technology in an effort to attract a diverse light industrial and commercial base. For instance, the city was the first in Kentucky to have street lights, one of the first with a police force, and strict regulations on agriculture within the city. Lexington also had an urban sewer system and a network of sidewalks by the early 1880s. Other infrastructure improvements were to come in the latter 1880s, including telephone lines, street railways, and a new ice factory. These improvements helped solidify Lexington's position as the "agricultural and manufacturing keystone" for the region.

Improvements in the marketing of tobacco, along with the deadly Black Patch Tobacco Wars in the early 1900s, helped foster in the era of burley for Lexington. Numerous auction companies and warehouses began to locate in south Lexington clustered along South Broadway. The first of these facilities was the Burley Loose Tobacco Warehouse Company in 1905. The city's first tobacco redrying plant also opened in that year. By 1910, Lexington lay claim to being the "largest tobacco market in the world.

In the 1930s, in an effort to counteract the Great Depression, several capital building projects were funded by the federal government and by wealthy members of the horse industry. The 1940s saw the creation of the Lexington Industrial Foundation and major growth at the University of Kentucky. Numerous new dormitories and classroom structures, some temporary, were constructed; Memorial Coliseum was completed during this time as well. In the early 1950s, a good deal of research money and effort was devoted to national defense projects relating to the Cold War. This expanded the university's influence on Lexington and on Kentucky as a whole, which in the long-run bolstered its employment numbers.

During this time, supported by A.B. "Happy" Chandler, the Kentucky Medical Foundation, and the Kentucky Farm Bureau, the University of Kentucky Medical Center became a top priority. In 1956, $5 million was appropriated to start construction of the medical center, which ultimately cost $28 million. Initial construction included a 500-bed hospital.

As a result of the Medical Center's construction, a new economic sector was born. Drawn by the Medical Center's growing influence, the Veterans Administration Hospital expanded while the Shriners Hospital for Crippled Children was constructed. St. Joseph's and Central Baptist oversaw major expansions during this time.

The early 1950s was often referred to as the "Industrial Revolution." Numerous companies, such as IBM (whose Lexington operations are now the core of Lexmark), Square D, and Dixie Cup opened operations within the city. This was soon followed by Trane. During this rapid growth between the years of 1954 and 1963, Lexington's employment rose 260 percent. The manufacturing output for the city rose fourfold. Between 1960 and 1970, the population of Lexington increased by 32% to just over 108,000. All of this industrial investment, coupled with a high demand for housing, led Lexington to become the 14th fastest-developing metropolitan area in the United States.
