= Bear's Mill =

- U.S. National Register of Historic Places
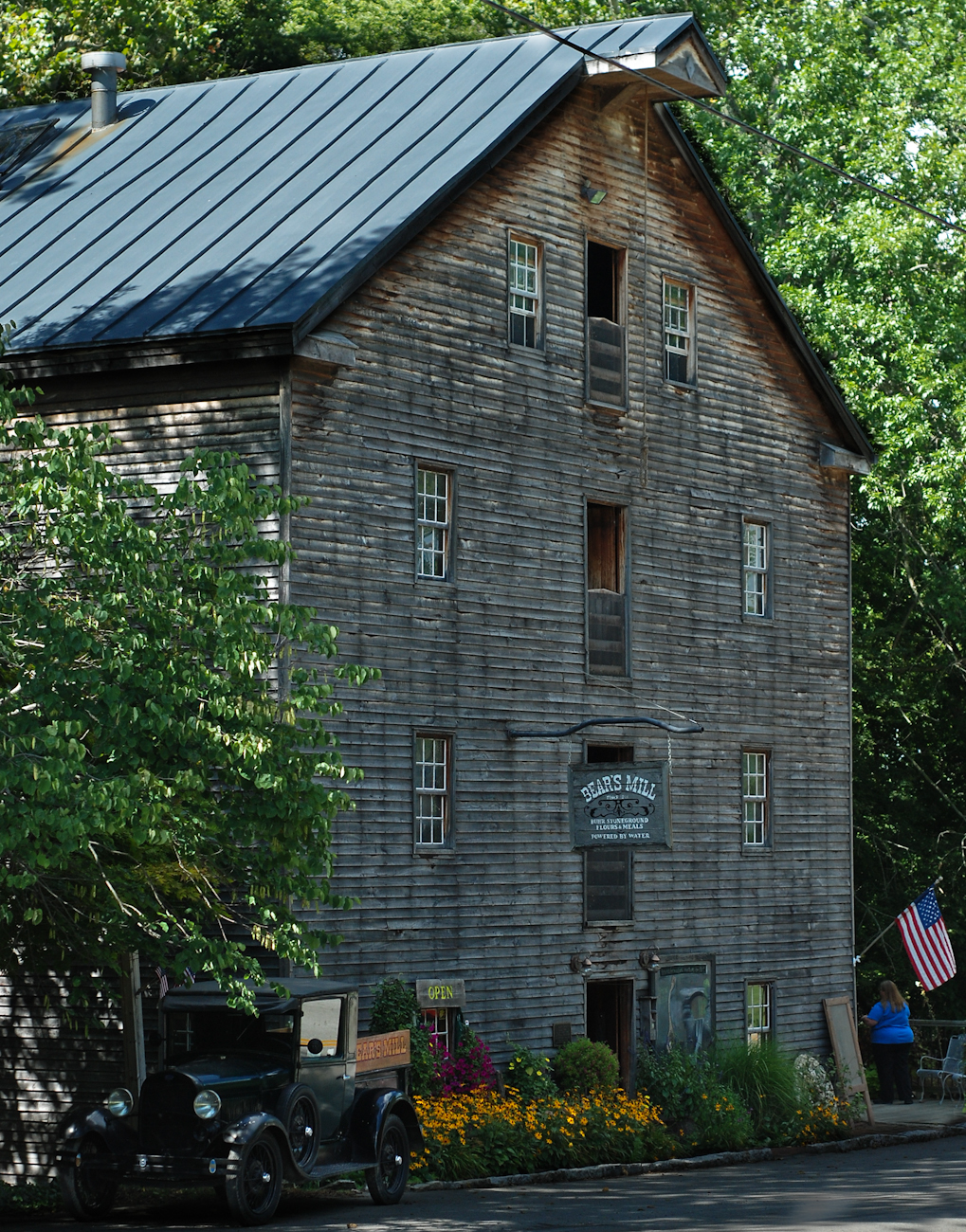
- Front of the mill

- Location within Ohio Location within the United States
- Location: 6450 Arcanum-Bear's Mill Rd.
- Nearest city: Greenville, Ohio
- Coordinates: 40°6′24″N 84°32′31″W
- Area: 6 acres (2.4 ha)
- Built: 1849
- Architect: William Moses; Manning Hart
- NRHP reference No.: 75001372
- Added to NRHP: June 10, 1975

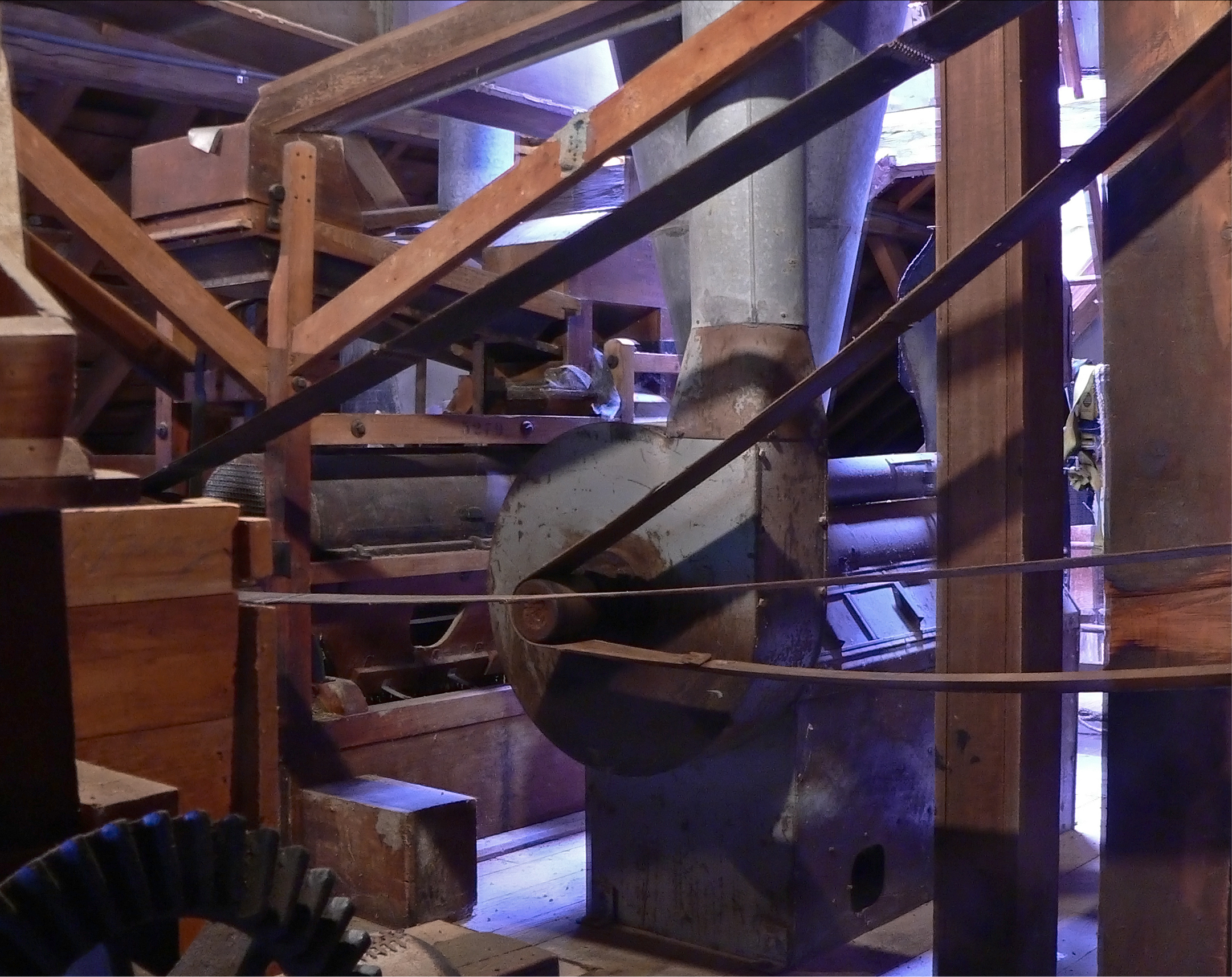
Detail of belt drive equipment inside mill

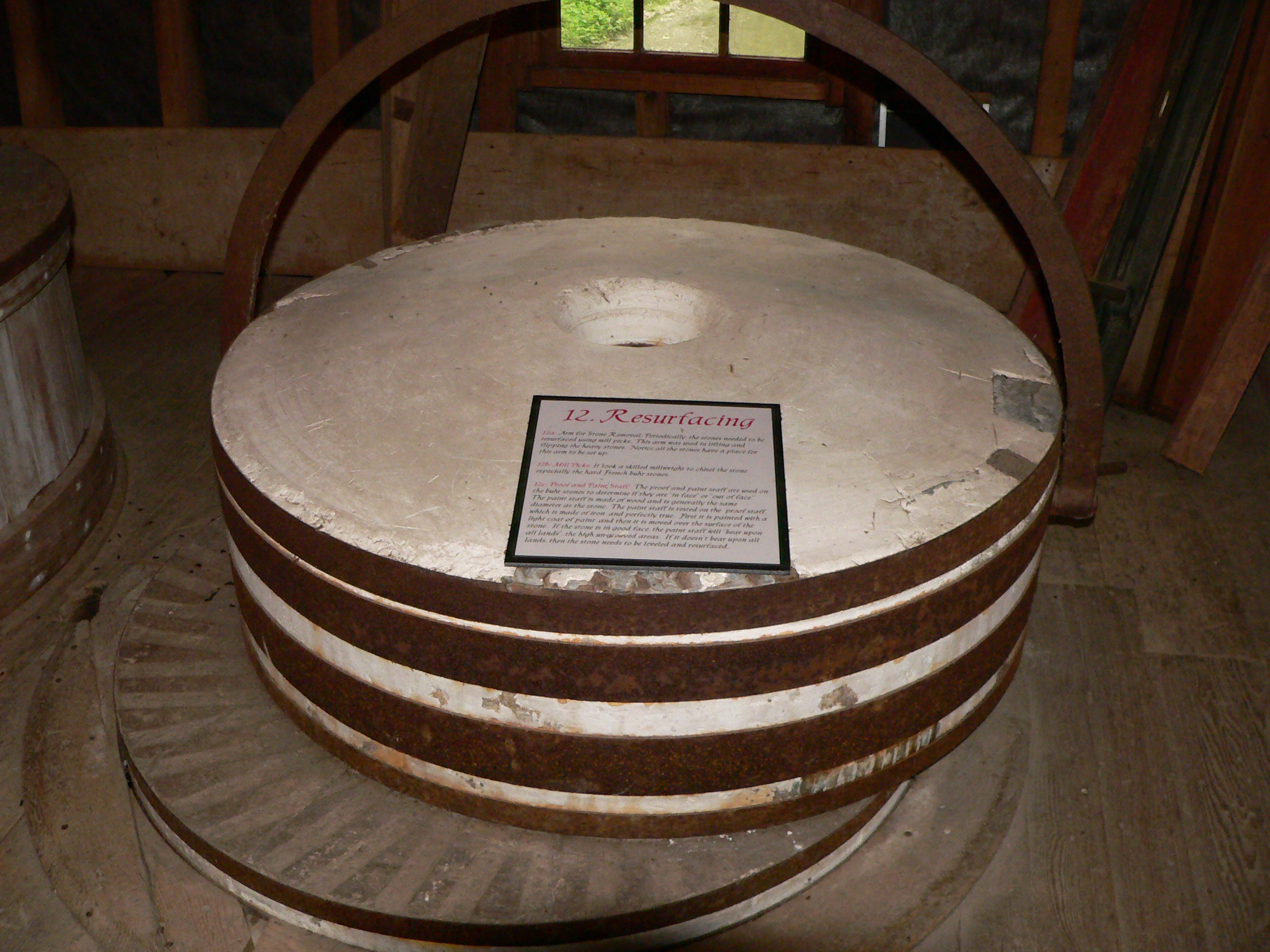
Buhr stone and description of dressing

Bear's Mill is a historic gristmill near the city of Greenville in Darke County, Ohio, United States. Built in 1849, this watermill is the oldest existing industrial building in Darke County. Built by Manning Hart, a local contractor, the mill lies along Greenville Creek in southwestern Adams Township, midway between Greenville and the village of Gettysburg. It was purchased before its completion by Pennsylvanian Gabriel Bear, who completed and opened the mill in 1849. After his locally made millstones proved faulty, Bear travelled to France, where he acquired stones of a type regarded worldwide as of highest quality.

The mill is a wooden building with a stone foundation and a metal roof. It remained in continuous operation for well over a century, slowing from full capacity only in the late 1970s when the miller decided to go into partial retirement. Since then, the mill has continued in use: partially as a milling museum, and partially as a gristmill. In 1975, it was listed on the National Register of Historic Places, qualifying because of its architecture and because of its significance in Ohio's history. Today, the mill is operated by the Friends of Bear's Mill, a non-profit organization dedicated to maintaining and operating the mill as a historic landmark.
