= Ray M. Petersime =

American businessman and Christian philanthropist

- Ray Petersime in early 1960s
- Born: April 6, 1899; Webster, Ohio
- Died: July 24, 1966 (aged 67); Bluffton, Indiana
- Occupation(s): inventor and manufacturer
- Known for: humanitarian and philanthropic activities
- Spouse: Bernice Bigler (married 1920)

Ray Miller Petersime (April 6, 1899 – July 24, 1966) was an American businessman and Christian philanthropist and humanitarian who was active in providing material relief to war-torn Europe after World War II and who secured sponsorship for more than a thousand European displaced persons, permitting their resettlement in the U.S.

== Early life, business and faith activities ==
Petersime was born on a farm near Webster, Ohio, to Ira M. and Elizabeth Petersime. Early in his life the family moved to Gettysburg, Ohio, where his father, a successful inventor and entrepreneur, established his businesses. Petersime attended Ohio State University and Miami-Jacobs Business College in Dayton, Ohio. In 1920 he married Bernice Bigler; they had five children. He briefly operated a poultry farm before joining his father in business in 1922. Ira Petersime is credited with the invention of the electric egg incubator in the early 1920’s. Ira M. Petersime and Son, later becoming the Petersime Incubator Company, soon built a manufacturing plant in Gettysburg and began producing electric poultry incubators and other hatchery equipment for which they were granted numerous patents in the U.S., Canada and Europe. The company was a major incubator manufacturer through much of the 20th century with representation in close to 50 countries.

Ray and Bernice Petersime were devout Christians and active members of the Church of the Brethren. He held lay positions in his congregation and the Southern Ohio district. He was a member of boards of trustees of several church-affiliated institutions: Manchester College (now Manchester University, North Manchester, IN, board member 1928-1962), Bethany Theological Seminary (Chicago, IL, board member 1957-1965) and Bethany Hospital (Chicago, IL). He participated in the work of a number of interdenominational organizations and programs, including the National Council of Churches, Gideons International, International Council of Religious Education and Christian Rural Overseas Program (CROP). Petersime was a member of the Prohibition Party and ran as the Prohibition candidate for several local and state offices, notably as the candidate for governor of Ohio in 1940. He purchased a lake and camp facility near Bellefontaine, Ohio, and in 1944 established the Mountain Lake Christian Service Camp.

Bernice Petersime was also involved in community and church work. She spent two months traveling in Europe in 1949 as a participant of a church-organized tour to learn about post-war conditions and Brethren relief efforts. She was the first woman to be elected to the Board of Trustees of The Brethren’s Home, a facility operated by the Church of the Brethren to care for the elderly, located in Greenville, Ohio. She served on the Board from 1959 to 1968.

== European relief work ==
Early in 1946, with the growing awareness among Americans of the devastation and deprivation being suffered by Europeans in the wake of World War II, Petersime approached the Brethren Service Commission (BSC) about reestablishing the poultry industry in Europe to help feed the population. In discussions with the BSC and the United Nations Relief and Rehabilitation Administration (UNRRA) it was decided that the provision of hatching eggs, producing chickens to be distributed to needy families, was a practical plan that would realize benefits quickly. Recent shipments of dairy livestock to European farmers had been a success and chickens could be raised with minimal resources as they can live on refuse and natural scavenging, and in short time provide eggs and meat. It was estimated that 2500 to 3000 families could benefit from a single egg shipment. The decision was made to direct the aid to Poland and arrangements were made with the Polish Ministry of Agriculture.

A plan was settled on that assigned Petersime the task of acquiring the eggs, preparing them for shipment and accompanying them to Poland; air shipment to Warsaw was arranged (including obtaining flight clearances from Russia) and paid for by the UNRRA. Petersime was issued UNRRA credentials and a special passport for the trip and upon return would provide the UNRRA and BSC a firsthand account of the conditions he encountered. He solicited hatching egg donations (only Rhode Island Red and White Leghorn breeds) from poultry producers and farmers in the Ohio-Indiana region. More eggs were donated than could be shipped. The eggs were graded, sorted and packed in wooden crates by church members. On May 7 55,800 crated eggs (quantity limited by plane capacity) were loaded on a C-54 transport plane at the Dayton Municipal Airport with church members, a UNRRA representative and the press looking on. Petersime joined a crew of five (four additional crew were picked up in Newark.) departing to Europe. After a rough flight delayed several times by weather, mechanical problems and bureaucracy, the plane arrived in Warsaw on May 11. The delivered eggs were reportedly hatched in incubators left by the Germans; the hatch was estimated to be 60%, considered a success especially given the delayed, rough flight. While in Warsaw he met with Protestant leaders and spoke in a worship service at a Methodist chapel. He also met with religious workers during brief stopovers in Berlin and Paris before returning to the States. The pleas for assistance and the destruction he observed left an impression that inspired and guided his subsequent relief activities. Published articles on the egg shipment recently inspired a light-hearted fictional account of the flight by a German writer.

Upon his return from Europe, Petersime made himself available for radio and newspaper interviews to promote further relief efforts. He reported to have participated in almost 500 radio broadcasts and gave many presentations about his trip to church, community and service organizations throughout the Midwest U.S. He initiated and promoted projects to collect food, grain and dry goods for shipment to Europe, usually as part of CROP relief efforts, and donated heifers for shipment to Europe by Heifers for Relief, the Brethren relief effort that became Heifer Project (now Heifer International). His association with Heifer Project would continue into the late 1950’s and early 60’s when he donated use of a farm near Gettysburg to serve as a regional animal collection facility.

== Sponsorship of displaced persons ==
Petersime was concerned with the dire circumstances of the roughly one million displaced persons (DPs) living in camps in western Europe after the war. In the face of government reluctance to address the issue, he joined in the activities of the Citizens Committee on Displaced Persons to convince the President and Congress of the moral obligation to allow DPs to immigrate and resettle in the US. When the Displaced Persons Act of 1948 was signed by President Truman, Petersime quickly assumed the role of sponsor, providing an assurance required by the Act that each sponsored immigrant (family) would be provided a home and job and not become public dependents. He became an active participant in the efforts of Church World Service (CWS), the interdenominational organization overseeing the resettlement of Protestant DP’s. He, furthermore, facilitated sponsorships by other individuals, churches and civic organizations and encouraged communities to welcome and support the immigrants.

The first group of Petersime-sponsored DPs arrived in Ohio in the spring of 1949, the beginning of a mission to which he would remain dedicated for years. He was fond of referring to the DP's as "Delayed Pilgrims". Petersime found homes and jobs for the DP’s throughout the Midwest; some moved to other parts of the country after getting a start on American life in Ohio. He hired some to work at his incubator factory, finding homes for them in the Gettysburg community. Petersime organized gatherings that provided opportunities for the immigrants to meet others, showcase the dress, music and food of their cultures and participate in religious services that incorporated elements from their faith traditions . The largest of these events, at Mountain Lake in August 1950, drew 450 people, more than half of which were DP’s. Among the displaced persons he sponsored there were several individuals who had attained professional distinction in their former countries. Burkards Dzenis, a well-respected Latvian sculptor, is a notable example. After the Displaced Persons Act expired in 1952 the immigration and resettlement of European refugees continued under the Refugee Relief Act of 1953. The Refugee Act had similar requirements of assurances of homes and jobs for the refugees which Petersime continued to fulfill. In 1956 CWS announced that Petersime had secured assurances for 1125 displaced persons, more than any other individual in the United States. Latvia was the most well-represented of the immigrants' nations of origin. After the Refugee Act expired in 1956 Petersime continued to assist immigrants with resettlement.

== Later life ==
Petersime Chapel on the campus of Manchester University

In the early 1960s Petersime fulfilled a long-time dream, donating a chapel building to Manchester College, where he had served on the board of trustees since 1928. Petersime Chapel was dedicated on May 27, 1962, and continues to serve as the center of religious life on institution’s main campus.

In 1965 he traveled to Haiti, where he visited orphanages and learned of the efforts of Church World Service to alleviate starvation among the children there. Shortly thereafter he participated in the creation of and served on the board of the Child Care Foundation, a privately funded interdenominational organization having the mission of providing food and medical care to destitute children worldwide. The first project undertaken by the foundation was directed to helping the children of Haiti.

Petersime died of leukemia on July 24, 1966, after a lengthy illness. He continued to be active in his business and humanitarian work into the final days before his death. Obituaries and editorials recounted his humanitarian and business accomplishments and dedication to his faith.
