= Incubator (egg) =

Device to keep eggs warm

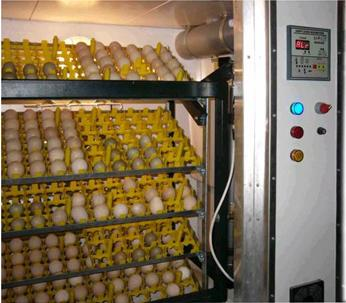
A modern egg incubator

An incubator is a device simulating avian incubation by keeping eggs warm at a particular temperature range and in the correct humidity with a turning mechanism to hatch them.

The common names of the incubator in other terms include breeding / hatching machines or hatchers, setters, and egg breeding / equipment.

There are several important factors to consider when using an incubator, the most critical being its ability to maintain steady and consistent temperature throughout the entire incubation period. Before use, the incubator should be checked thoroughly, carefully prepared and operated according to the instructions from the manufacturer.

== History ==
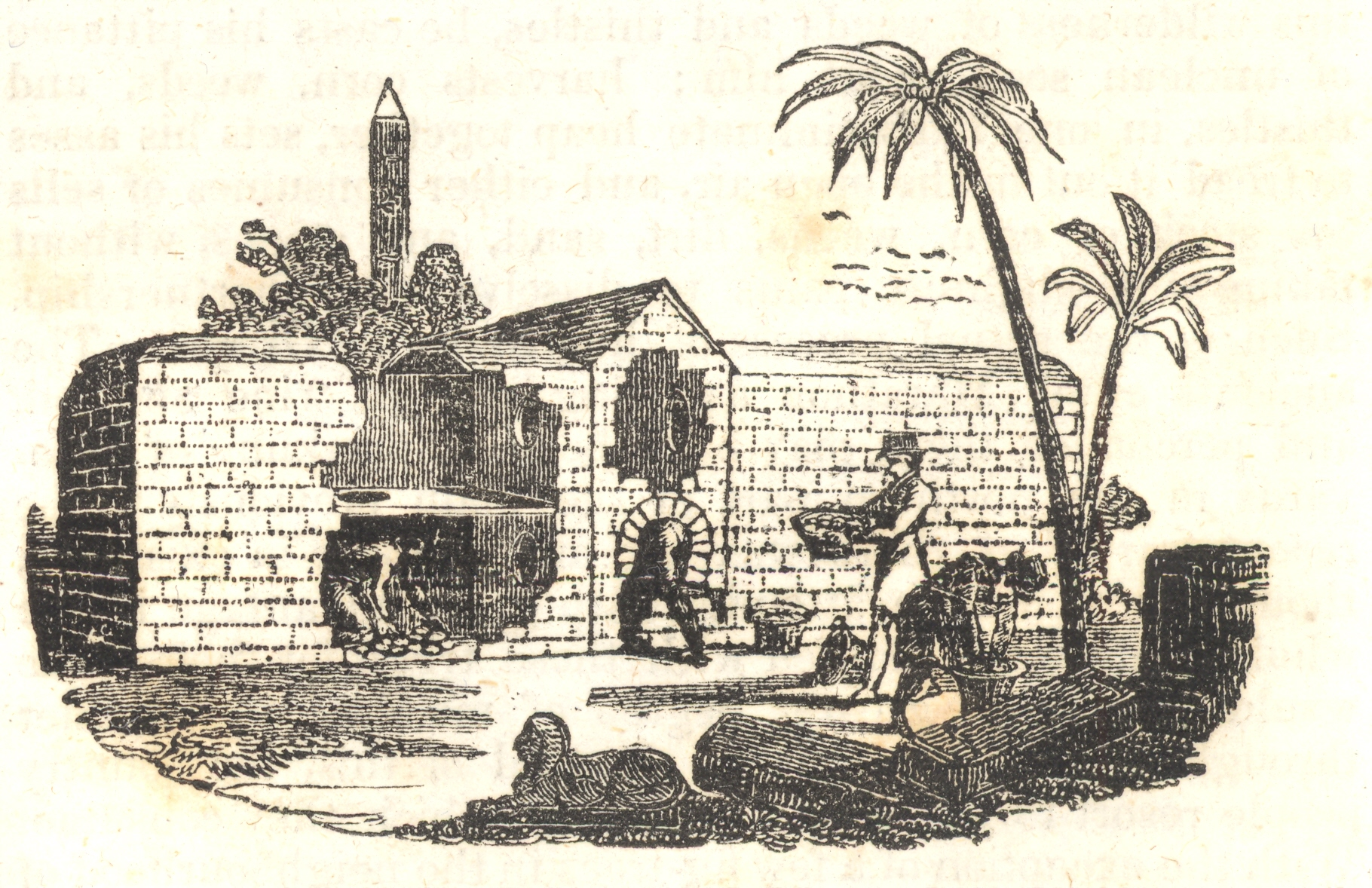
Egyptian egg oven

The Egyptians had a method of incubating in 400 BC, using a cylindrical building or oven that had a fire at the bottom. The eggs that were incubating were placed on an inverted cone that was partially covered in ash. The eggs were placed in a woven basket that sat on top of the ashes. The building also had a roof that allowed smoke to escape, but it kept the rain out. Egyptian egg ovens are typically brick structures in a pyramidal shape, with two internal chambers.

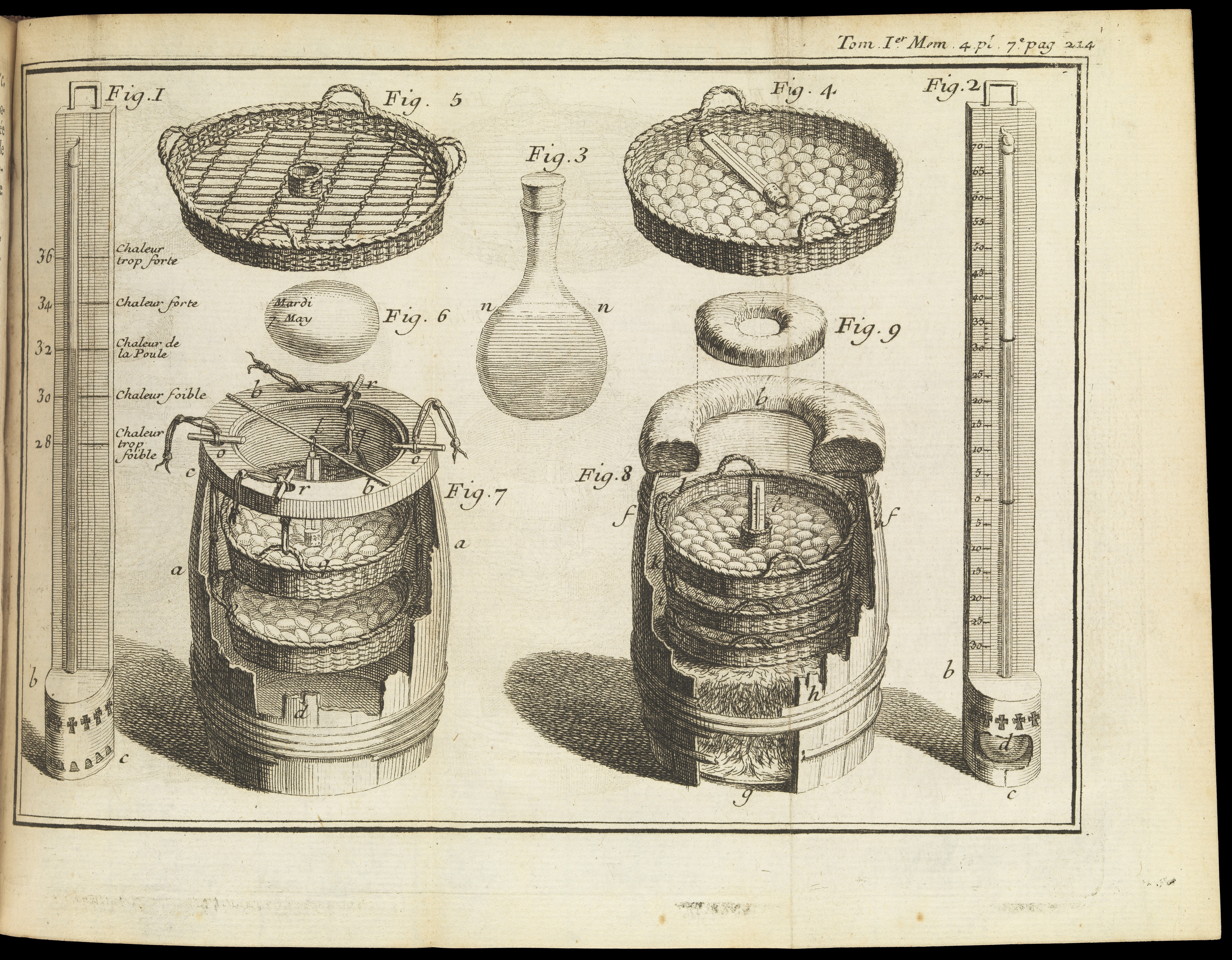
Réaumur's incubator

Controlled scientific incubation required the accurate and repeatable measurement of temperature, such as the alcohol-based thermometer proposed by the French naturalist and scientist René Antoine Ferchault de Réaumur in 1730, and the temperature scale named after him.

Réaumur used the thermometer in his design for an artificial incubator, presented to the Académie des sciences in 1747, and published in 1749 as l’Art de faire éclore et d'élever en toute saison des oiseaux domestiques de toutes espèces, soit par le moyen de la chaleur du fumier, soit par le moyen de celle du feu ordinaire, or "The art of hatching and rearing domestic birds of all species in all seasons, either by means of the heat of manure or by means of ordinary fire".

Lyman Byce created a coal lamp incubator in 1879. The first commercial machine was made by Hearson in the year of 1881.

Ira M. Petersime of Gettysburg, Ohio, USA is credited with inventing the electric egg incubator in 1922. Shortly thereafter he and his son, Ray, began manufacturing the incubators. They were granted numerous patents on design features and subsequent improvements. The innovation of the electrically powered incubator with expanded capacity (early on Petersime offered a model holding 15,000 eggs) encouraged the growth of large scale commercial hatcheries.

== Purposes ==
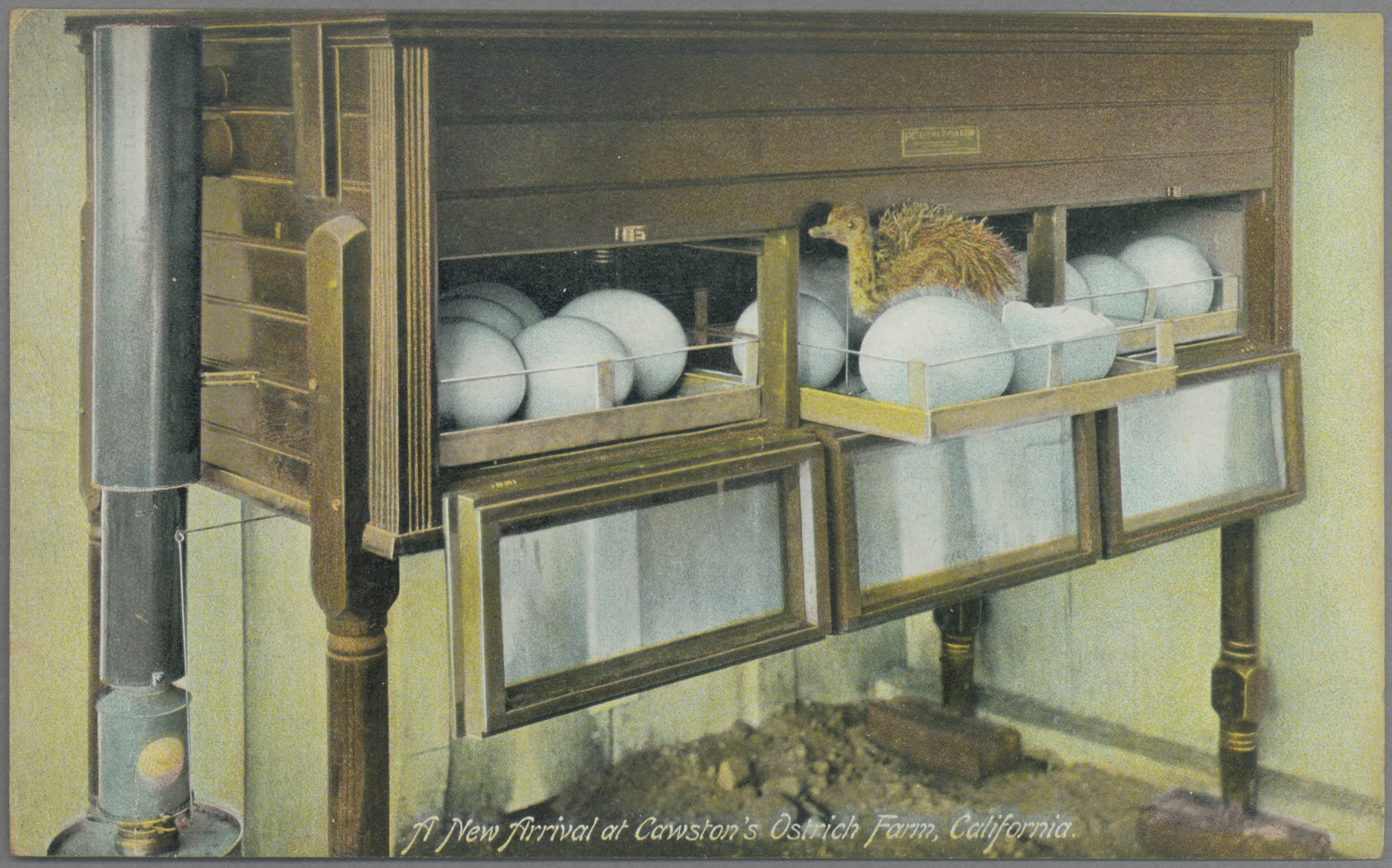
A 20th-century postcard depicting eggs and a hatchling in an incubator for ostrich farming

The incubator is an apparatus that is used to regulate environmental conditions such as temperature, humidity and turning for successful hatching of the fertile eggs placed in an enclosure. It is often used for growing bacterial cultures, hatching eggs artificially, or providing suitable conditions for a chemical or biological reaction. The incubator is recorded being used to hatch bird and reptile eggs. It lets the fetus inside the egg grow without the mother needing to be present to provide the warmth. Chicken eggs are recorded to hatch after about 21 days, but other species of birds can take a longer or shorter amount of time. Incubators are also used to raise birds.

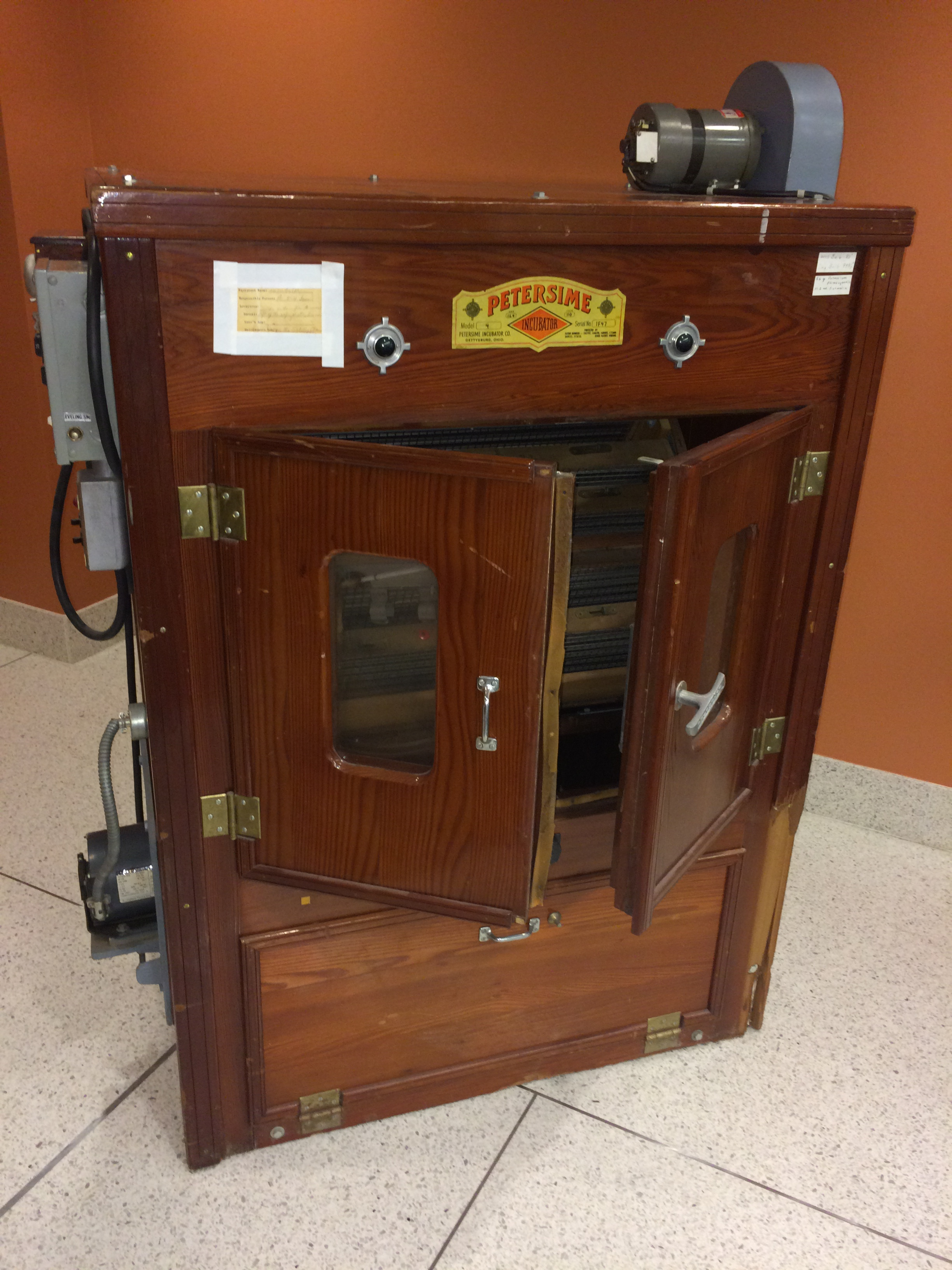
A small incubator used to hatch quail eggs for nutrition research at the U. S. Food and Drug Administration during the 1960s to 1980s. The incubator is now on display at the FDA headquarters in Silver Spring, Maryland.

An incubator should be able to set the perfect environment and condition for an egg to incubate because it regulates the factors such as temperature, humidity, and turning the eggs when necessary, so the egg is incubated properly because it plays the role of the hen in its natural state. The incubator also allows the egg to incubate while eliminating the external threats that could possibly harm the eggs.

The modern hatchery manager's goal is to produce large numbers of uniform, robust, day-old chicks. Robustness is a health criterion, originating in the embryonic life stage of the chicken – and correlating directly with the performance and resistance of individual chicks under differing farm conditions. Incubating different species of birds at the same time is possible within the same incubator.

== Incubation methods ==
In industrial incubation, there are two common used methods of incubation: single-stage and multi-stage. In single-stage incubation, the incubator contains only eggs of the same embryonic age. The advantage of single-stage incubation is that climate conditions can be adjusted according to the needs of all the growing embryo. In multi-stage incubation the setter contains eggs of different embryonic ages, usually 3 to 6 age groups. Consequently, climate conditions cannot exactly be adjusted according to the needs of all the growing embryos and a compromise has to be sought to best suit the age groups presented in the setter. In a multi-stage incubation procedure, the heat produced by the older embryos is used to heat the warmth-demanding younger embryos in the same machine. Due to different physical demand in Multi-Stage and Single-stage different equipment is needed to be successful. Many industrial producers use traditional Single-Stage machines, but REAL Single-stage is available.

== Styles ==
Modern incubators are electrically heated, controlled by a thermostat while some are powered by solar energy due to epileptic and erratic electricity supply. They can be used in a farmhouse, such as a large chicken-raising facilities, or they can be found in a common classroom for students to observe the egg inside and when it hatches. Some industrial incubators are large enough to hold up to 124,416 eggs, and some other styles can only hold a few eggs.

The styles of incubators include:

- Setter incubator
- Hatcher incubator
- Combination incubator

== See also ==
- Hand-rearing
- Puppet-rearing
- On-farm hatching
