= Hack (falconry) =

Training method that helps young birds of prey reach their hunting potential

Hacking is a training method that helps young birds of prey reach their hunting potential by giving them exercise and experience. This technique is used to prepare the falcon to become an independent hunter. The sequence of the procedure includes captivity, releasing, flight, and either the falcon will be recaptured for falconry or released into the wild. This has also been adapted to other raptor species to preserve the population. Generally, falconers agree that hacked falcons are better and more preferred in the field. Hacking is beneficial, not only for the falconers, but for the bird itself and the species; however, there are some criticism and restrictions that come along with this method.

== Procedure ==
=== Captivity ===
Hacking sites are usually large tracts of land. These areas have to be similar to the natural surroundings of a wild nest. The young raptors are put in a “hack box”, boxes that contain a nest inside that protect them from predators and are usually placed on a high site, e.g. cliffs, atop poles. Eggs are either captive bred or taken from wild nests and the chicks are placed in the boxes a couple of weeks before they reach their fledge age of six weeks. Until then, the birds are closely looked after and provided food without too much human contact.

=== Releasing ===
The box is open after they have been in there for about 5 to 10 days, which gives them the freedom to do what they want around the box. However, they are not ready to fly yet. At this point they can climb down from their box, flap their wings to get a feel for the wind and exercise their muscles. Just as they would in the wild, the young stay close to the safe area.

=== Flight ===
The time until the first flight is taken should take about 3 days after the hack box is open, which should be a distance around a few dozen feet. Afterwards, the young start to fly further away for a longer span. Hacking has an indefinite time period because it depends on the weather conditions and the personality of the bird. At this flying stage, the raptors learn how to self-hunt but are still fed and watched over. Males are more likely to hunt independently before females do.

=== After hacking ===
Once the falcons are confident and independent they are either allowed to migrate into the wild, recaptured for falconry and trained further i.e. with a lure for sport, or released into the wild. If the purpose of the hack is to prepare the raptor to be in the wild then the reserve hopes that the falcons will come back in a few years to nest there.

== Benefits ==
- It gives an enhanced experience for young to grow into strong and skilled hunters.
- During hack, the falcons receive more stimuli because the site is set up to mentally condition them, especially since there are other falcons to play and interact with.
- The chicks are secured with safety and food.
- They are given food even when they are becoming independent.
- Hack boxes protect the young from predators
- The caretakers limit contact so that the falcons will not rely too much on human resources if they are released into the wild.
- The use of hacking helps preserve the population of any species of raptors.

== Criticism and restrictions ==
- According to the Wildlife and Countryside Act 1981, a law in the UK, one cannot disturb wildlife nests, which includes taking any eggs.
- Hacking is considered time consuming and unpredictable.
- There are limited places to have hacking sites because of weather conditions and large spaces in good conditions are scarce.
- Illnesses spread easily when birds are being hacked together, e.g. if one gets West Nile then the rest of them are prone to catch it.

== History ==
Falconry has been a hunting sport since 2000 BC originating in ancient China and Egypt and since then the technique of hacking has been used and evolved. The term "hacking," however, was not coined until the Elizabethan era. During that period, falconers brought a “hack,” an old English word for a type of wagon, to a hilltop and placed young falcons upon it when they still did not know how to fly yet.

There were over 300 breeding pairs of peregrine falcons before World War II in eastern United States. In the late 1940s, a large, abrupt decline of prey birds came about. On top of the pre-WWII causes of gradual decrease of population (e.g. shooting of birds, egg collecting, predators, etc.), the main component to the downfall was the popular use of an insecticide called DDT. The product would be carried in the prey and kill the birds off and DDE, the by-product, would accumulate in a female's body, causing the eggs produced by her to become fragile. Because of this disruption, Peregrine falcons were officially on the federal endangered species list in 1970. Four years later, a program to restore the bird's population started in which they were bred in captivity. Breeders adapted the hacking technique so that the falcons and other endangered raptors could become independent once released into the wild. Additional hacking could even be conducted in urban areas when old nests, or eyries, were found atop buildings.

== See also ==
- Falconry training and technique
- Fostering (falconry)
- Hand-rearing
- Human-guided migration
- Puppet-rearing
