= Bradford, Ohio =

- Village
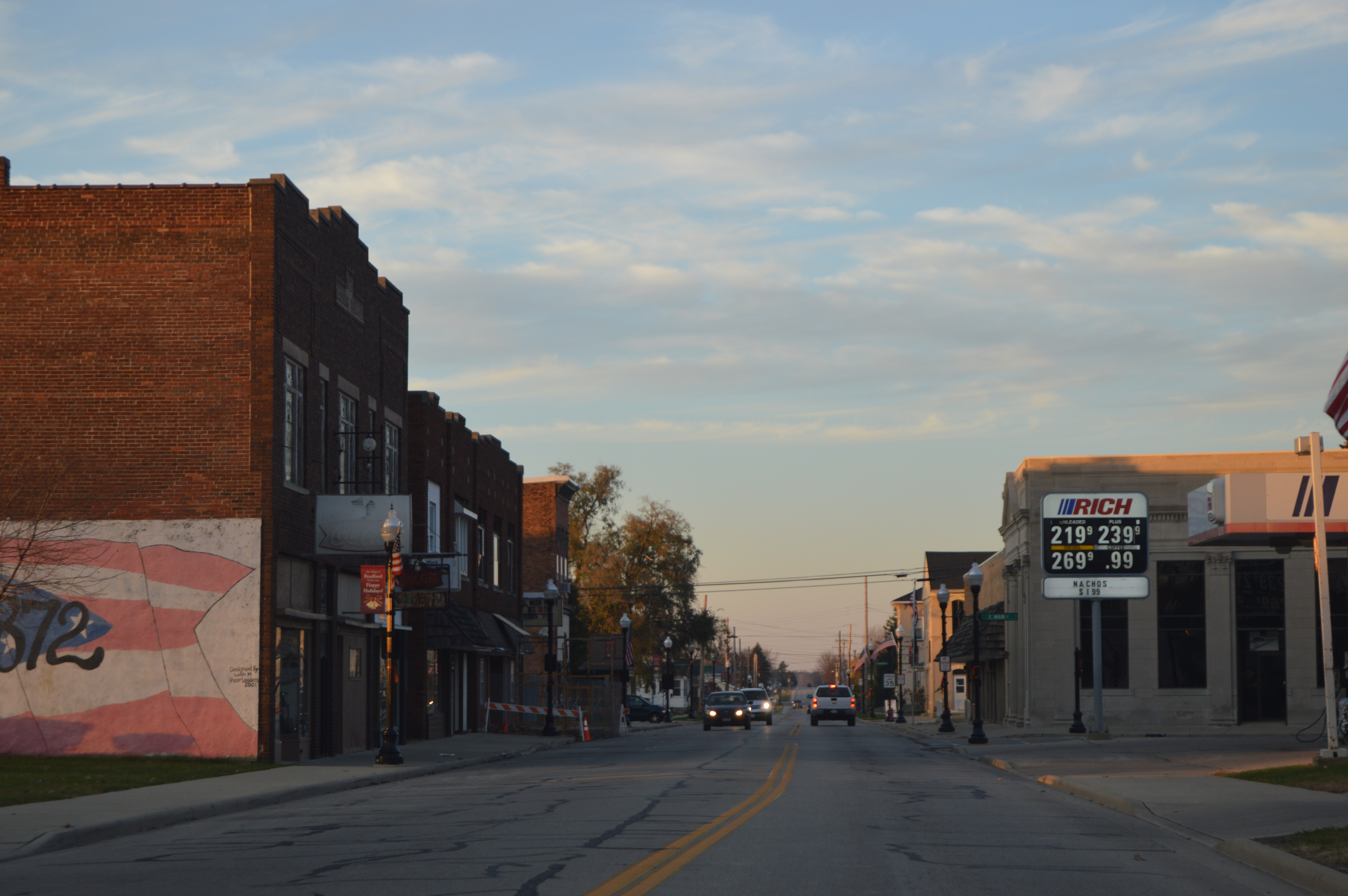
- Miami Street downtown

- Location in Darke County and the state of Ohio.
- Coordinates: 40°07′40″N 84°25′44″W
- Country: United States
- State: Ohio
- Counties: Miami, Darke

Government
  - Mayor: Don Stump

Area
  - Total: 0.86 sq mi (2.22 km^{2})
  - Land: 0.83 sq mi (2.16 km^{2})
  - Water: 0.023 sq mi (0.06 km^{2})
- Elevation: 991 ft (302 m)

Population (2020)
  - Total: 1,796
  - Estimate (2023): 1,797
  - Density: 2,152.8/sq mi (831.22/km^{2})
- Time zone: UTC-5 (Eastern (EST))
  - Summer (DST): UTC-4 (EDT)
- ZIP code: 45308
- Area codes: 937, 326
- FIPS code: 39-08084
- GNIS feature ID: 2398161
- Website: https://bradfordoh.com/

Bradford is a village in Darke and Miami counties in the U.S. state of Ohio. The population was 1,796 at the 2020 census.

The Miami County portion of Bradford is part of the Dayton Metropolitan Statistical Area, while the Darke County portion is part of the Greenville Micropolitan Statistical Area.

== History ==
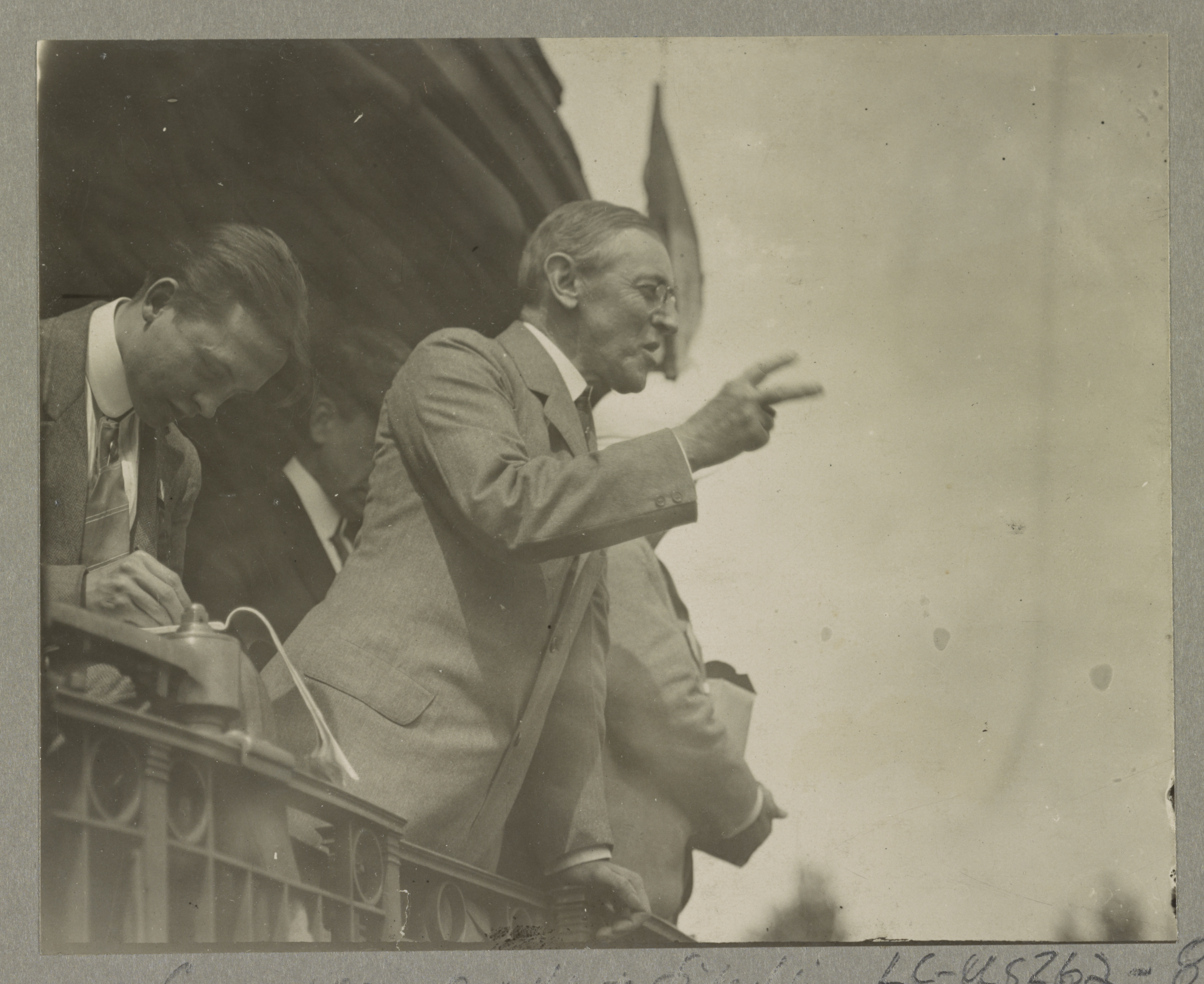
Then Governor Woodrow Wilson campaigning in Bradford, Ohio from a train in 1912.

Bradford was platted in 1865 entirely within Darke County, and it incorporated in 1871. The village was named for Tom Bradford, a railroad official. Its population was recorded at 243 by the 1870 Census. By 1890, the community had grown to 1,338 residents, the majority of whom lived in Miami County. Its growth was due to its location on the Pittsburgh, Cincinnati, Chicago and St. Louis Railroad. At Bradford, the line from Pittsburgh split into a northern branch that went to Chicago and a southern branch that went to East St. Louis. The trains took on provisions and changed crews at Bradford, and some crew members found it a convenient place to live. Successor line Conrail abandoned the tracks through Bradford in the 1980s.

== Geography ==
Bradford is located at 40°7′40″N 84°25′48″W (40.127905, -84.429927).

According to the United States Census Bureau, the village has a total area of 0.88 square miles (2.28 km^{2}), of which 0.86 square miles (2.23 km^{2}) is land and 0.02 square miles (0.05 km^{2}) is water.

=== County line ===
Ohio State Route 721, or Miami Avenue, is the main north–south road in the village and it also marks the county line between Darke County on the west and Miami County on the east. The Darke County portion of the village lies in Adams Township while the Miami County portion lies in Newberry Township. In Miami County it is approximately 12 miles from the County Seat Troy. In Darke County it is approximately 8 miles east of the County Seat of Greenville.

== Demographics ==
Historical population
Census	Pop.	Note	%±
1870	409		—
1880	1,373		235.7%
1890	1,338		−2.5%
1900	1,254		−6.3%
1910	1,844		47.0%
1920	2,356		27.8%
1930	1,732		−26.5%
1940	1,775		2.5%
1950	2,055		15.8%
1960	2,148		4.5%
1970	2,163		0.7%
1980	2,166		0.1%
1990	2,005		−7.4%
2000	1,859		−7.3%
2010	1,842		−0.9%
2020	1,796		−2.5%
2023 (est.)	1,797	▲	0.1%
U.S. Decennial Census

=== 2010 census ===
As of the census of 2010, there were 1,842 people, 676 households, and 502 families living in the village. The population density was 2,141.9 inhabitants per square mile (827.0/km^{2}). There were 751 housing units at an average density of 872.1 per square mile (336.7/km^{2}). The racial makeup of the village was 98.9% White, 0.2% African American, 0.1% Native American, 0.2% Asian, 0.1% Pacific Islander, 0.3% from other races, and 0.3% from two or more races. Hispanic or Latino of any race were 0.9% of the population.

There were 676 households, of which 41.0% had children under the age of 18 living with them, 55.8% were married couples living together, 11.8% had a female householder with no husband present, 6.7% had a male householder with no wife present, and 25.7% were non-families. 22.0% of all households were made up of individuals, and 11.4% had someone living alone who was 65 years of age or older. The average household size was 2.72 and the average family size was 3.14.

The median age in the village was 35.6 years. 28.5% of residents were under the age of 18; 8.5% were between the ages of 18 and 24; 26% were from 25 to 44; 23.3% were from 45 to 64; and 13.7% were 65 years of age or older. The gender makeup of the village was 47.8% male and 52.2% female.

=== 2000 census ===
As of the census of 2000, there were 1,859 people, 693 households, and 516 families living in the village. The population density was 2,407.3 inhabitants per square mile (929.5/km^{2}). There were 741 housing units at an average density of 959.5 per square mile (370.5/km^{2}). The racial makeup of the village was 98.82% White, 0.38% Native American, 0.11% Asian, 0.05% Pacific Islander, 0.05% from other races, and 0.59% from two or more races. Hispanic or Latino of any race were 0.32% of the population.

There were 693 households, out of which 36.8% had children under the age of 18 living with them, 57.1% were married couples living together, 11.3% had a female householder with no husband present, and 25.4% were non-families. 21.5% of all households were made up of individuals, and 10.2% had someone living alone who was 65 years of age or older. The average household size was 2.68 and the average family size was 3.14.

In the village, the population was spread out, with 28.3% under the age of 18, 8.8% from 18 to 24, 31.2% from 25 to 44, 20.2% from 45 to 64, and 11.4% who were 65 years of age or older. The median age was 33 years. For every 100 females there were 96.7 males. For every 100 females age 18 and over, there were 97.6 males.

The median income for a household in the village was $38,125, and the median income for a family was $43,594. Males had a median income of $31,468 versus $22,161 for females. The per capita income for the village was $14,719. About 5.6% of families and 6.7% of the population were below the poverty line, including 5.5% of those under age 18 and 9.1% of those age 65 or over.

== Education ==
The school district is Bradford Exempted Village School District. The village is home to the Bradford High School.

== Notable people ==
- John Scalzi, author
- Allen Sothoron, baseball player and manager.
- William Warner "Jiggs" Ullery, professional football player and coach.
