= Puppet-rearing =

Use of puppets in raising birds

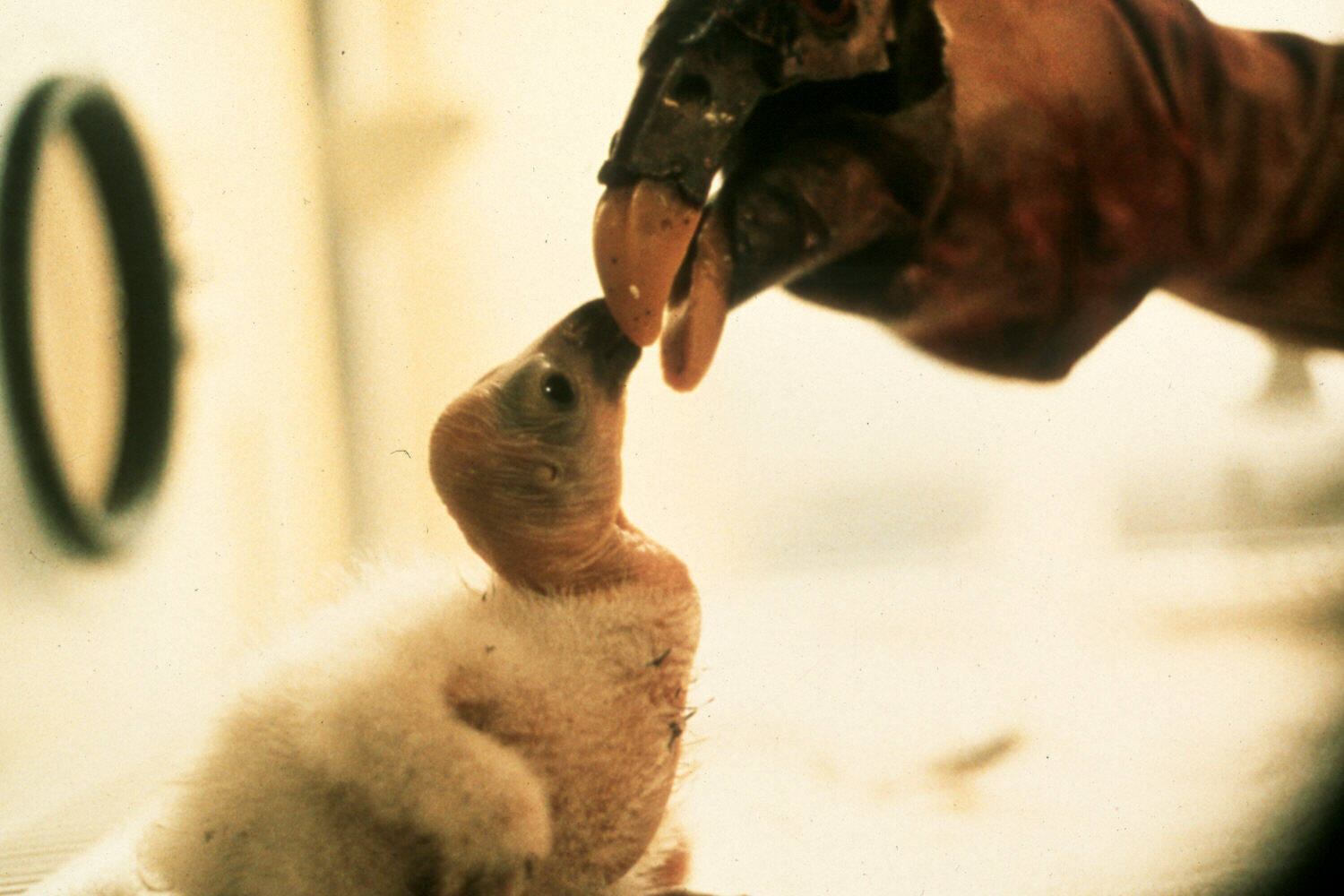
Puppet feeding of a captive California condor chick.

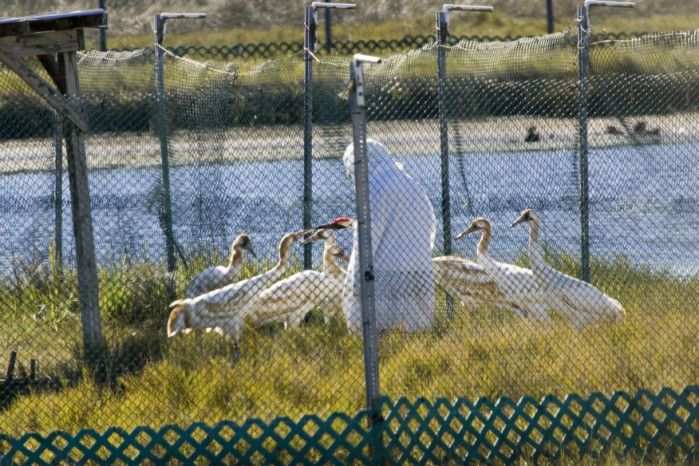
A person in a costume feeding juvenile whooping cranes.

Puppet-rearing is a method of breeding birds in captivity for reintroduction into the wild. Chicks are fed using puppets that simulate adults of their species, worn by caregivers whose bodies are hidden from view, thereby reducing the birds' direct contact with humans.

Through imprinting, birds associate the first care images with their parents. In artificial incubation of eggs or orphaned chicks it is necessary to feed them by hand as long as they cannot do it themselves. For this reason, puppets are used to guarantee that the birds can be released later, having generated links with their own species and remaining distrustful of human beings.

== See also ==
- Artificial incubation
- Cross-fostering
- Fostering (falconry)
- Hack (falconry)
- Hand-rearing
- Human-guided migration
- Falconry
