= Fostering (falconry) =

Fostering, in falconry and reintroduction of birds, is a method of breeding birds for their introduction into the wild that consists of placing chicks in the nest of a couple that has others of a similar age and size. Sometimes it can also be used when the chicks have already left the nest but continue to be fed by their parents.

This method can be used in those species that do not have siblicide behaviors and that are capable of carrying out this adoption without rejecting the new chicks. In addition, the parents must have previously been assessed to find out if they are capable of feeding more chicks.

== See also ==
- Cross-fostering
- Hack (falconry)
- Hand-rearing
- Human-guided migration
- Puppet-rearing
