= Adams Township, Darke County, Ohio =

Township in Ohio, US

- Township
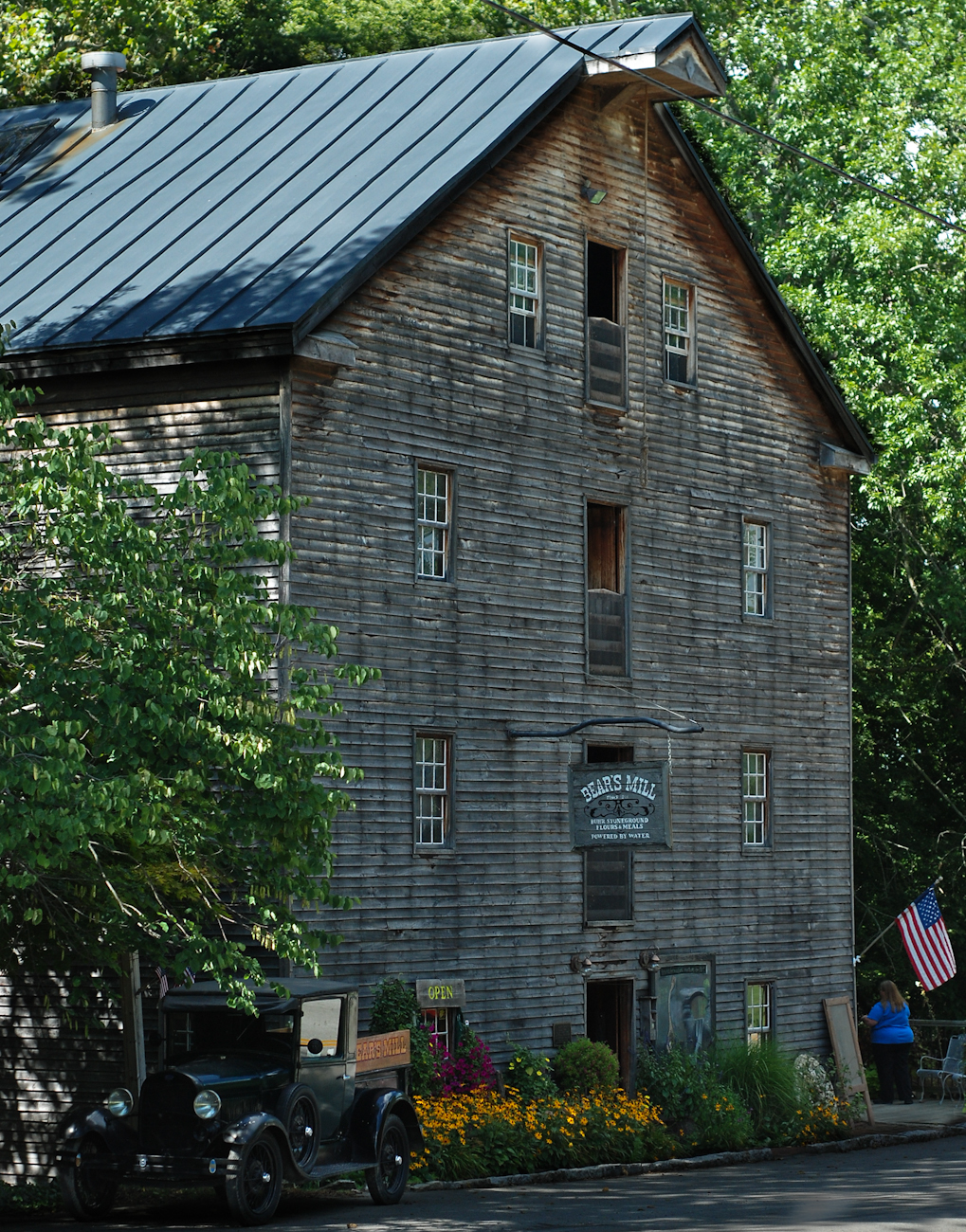
- Bear's Mill, a historic site in the township

- Location in Darke County and the state of Ohio.
- Coordinates: 40°7′47″N 84°29′17″W
- Country: United States
- State: Ohio
- County: Darke

Area
  - Total: 37.5 sq mi (97.1 km^{2})
  - Land: 37.2 sq mi (96.3 km^{2})
  - Water: 0.31 sq mi (0.8 km^{2})
- Elevation: 1,004 ft (306 m)

Population (2020)
  - Total: 3,343
  - Density: 89.9/sq mi (34.7/km^{2})
- Time zone: UTC-5 (Eastern (EST))
  - Summer (DST): UTC-4 (EDT)
- FIPS code: 39-00254
- GNIS feature ID: 1086009

Adams Township is one of the twenty townships of Darke County, Ohio, United States. The 2020 census found 3,343 people in the township.

== Geography ==
Located in the eastern part of the county, it borders the following townships:

- Wayne Township - north
- Newberry Township, Miami County - east
- Newton Township, Miami County - southeast corner
- Franklin Township - south
- Van Buren Township - southwest
- Greenville Township - west
- Richland Township - northwest

Two incorporated villages are located in Adams Township: part of Bradford in the east, and Gettysburg in the south.

== Name and history ==
Adams Township was established in 1819. This township was named for Major Adams, an early settler. It is one of ten Adams Townships statewide. A historic site in Adams Township is Bear's Mill. Located along Greenville Creek in southwestern Adams Township, it is a working gristmill that was built in the 1840s.

== Government ==
The township is governed by a three-member board of trustees, who are elected in November of odd-numbered years to a four-year term beginning on the following January 1. Two are elected in the year after the presidential election and one is elected in the year before it. There is also an elected township fiscal officer, who serves a four-year term beginning on April 1 of the year after the election, which is held in November of the year before the presidential election. Vacancies in the fiscal officership or on the board of trustees are filled by the remaining trustees.
