= Van Buren Township, Darke County, Ohio =

Township in Ohio, US

- Township
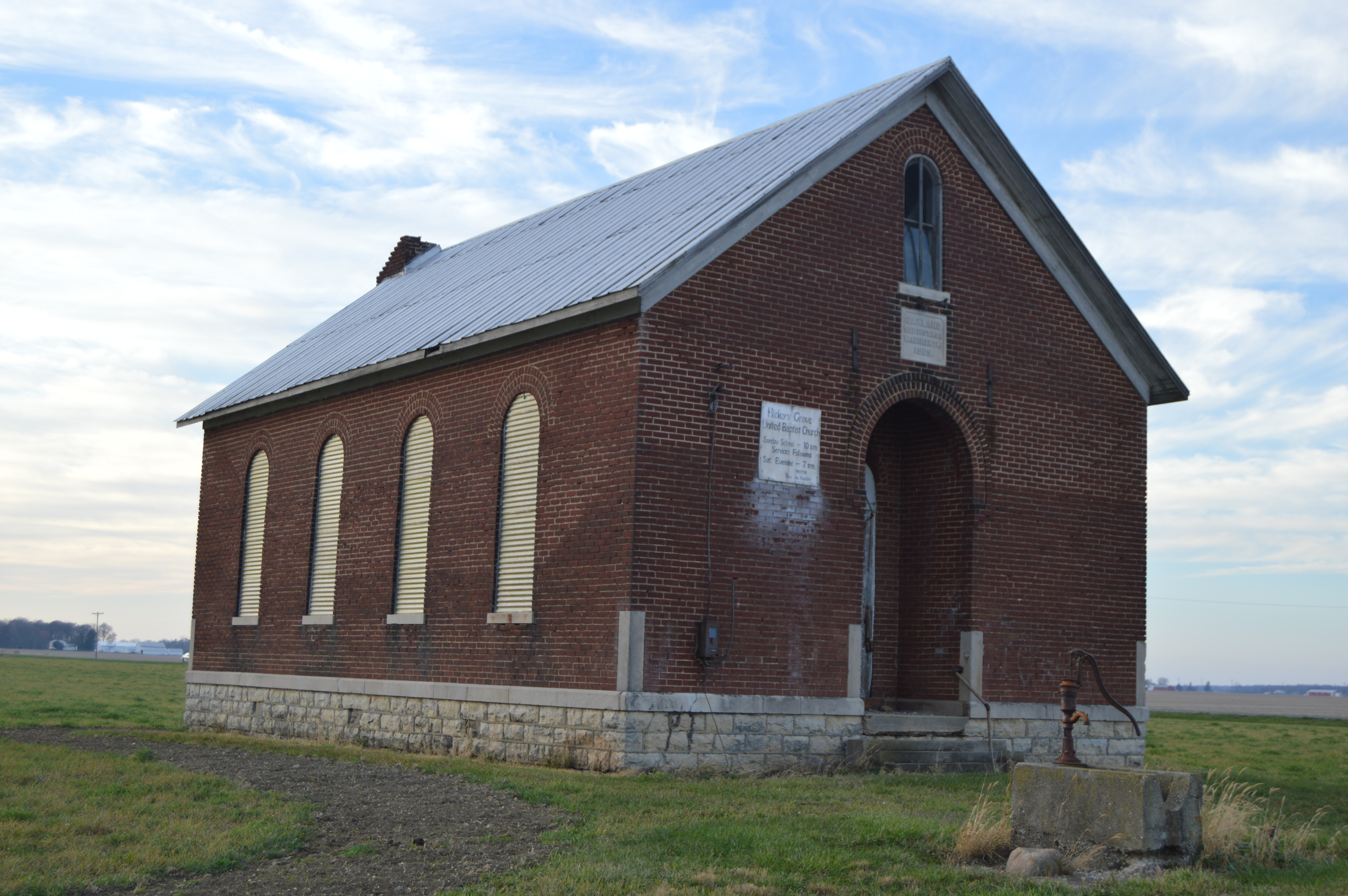
- Schoolhouse in the township's northeast

- Location in Darke County and the state of Ohio
- Coordinates: 40°2′48″N 84°32′55″W
- Country: United States
- State: Ohio
- County: Darke

Area
  - Total: 25.4 sq mi (65.7 km^{2})
  - Land: 25.4 sq mi (65.7 km^{2})
  - Water: 0 sq mi (0.0 km^{2})
- Elevation: 1,033 ft (315 m)

Population (2020)
  - Total: 1,528
  - Density: 60.2/sq mi (23.3/km^{2})
- Time zone: UTC-5 (Eastern (EST))
  - Summer (DST): UTC-4 (EDT)
- FIPS code: 39-79380
- GNIS feature ID: 1086024

Van Buren Township is one of the twenty townships of Darke County, Ohio, United States. The 2020 census found 1,528 people in the township.

== Geography ==
Located in the southern part of the county, it borders the following townships:

- Adams Township - north
- Franklin Township - east
- Monroe Township - southeast corner
- Twin Township - south
- Butler Township - southwest corner
- Neave Township - west
- Greenville Township - northwest

No municipalities are located in Van Buren Township.

== Name and history ==
Statewide, other Van Buren Townships are located in Hancock, Putnam, and Shelby counties.

Van Buren Township was created in June 1838 and reduced by the formation of Franklin Township in June of the following year. It is probable that the township's first settlers arrived in 1818. Over thirty years passed between the first settlement and the foundation of the first churches; the United Brethren and Methodist Episcopal churches were established in 1850.

Van Buren Township was named for Martin Van Buren, eighth President of the United States and President at the time of the township's creation.

== Government ==
The township is governed by a three-member board of trustees, who are elected in November of odd-numbered years to a four-year term beginning on the following January 1. Two are elected in the year after the presidential election and one is elected in the year before it. There is also an elected township fiscal officer, who serves a four-year term beginning on April 1 of the year after the election, which is held in November of the year before the presidential election. Vacancies in the fiscal officership or on the board of trustees are filled by the remaining trustees.
