= Monroe Township, Darke County, Ohio =

Township in Ohio, US

- Township
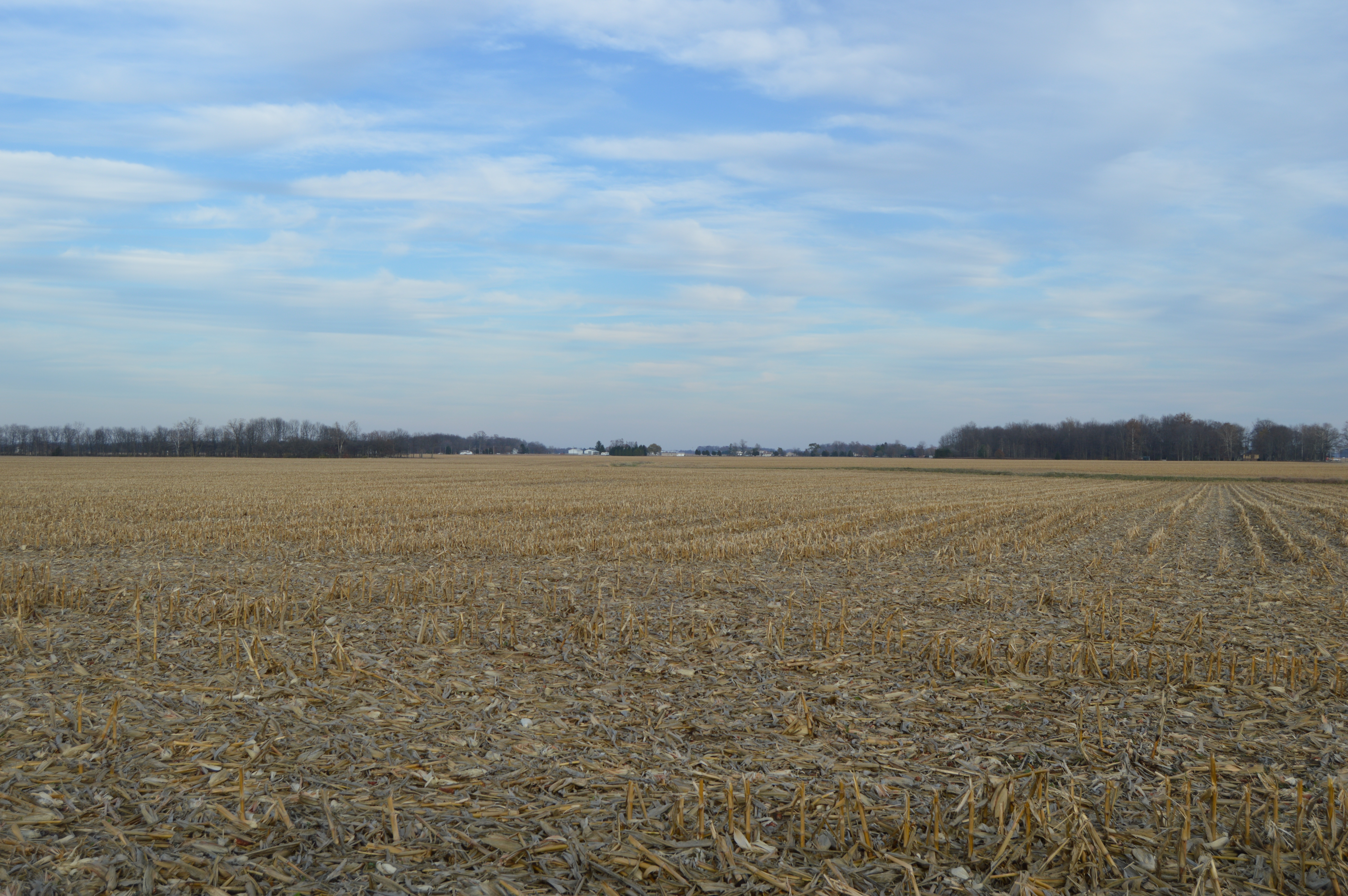
- Fields southwest of Pitsburg

- Location in Darke County and the state of Ohio
- Coordinates: 39°58′6″N 84°28′23″W
- Country: United States
- State: Ohio
- County: Darke

Area
  - Total: 25.7 sq mi (66.5 km^{2})
  - Land: 25.7 sq mi (66.5 km^{2})
  - Water: 0 sq mi (0.0 km^{2})
- Elevation: 1,037 ft (316 m)

Population (2020)
  - Total: 1,647
  - Density: 64.1/sq mi (24.8/km^{2})
- Time zone: UTC-5 (Eastern (EST))
  - Summer (DST): UTC-4 (EDT)
- FIPS code: 39-51366
- GNIS feature ID: 1086019

Monroe Township is one of the twenty townships of Darke County, Ohio, United States. The 2020 census found 1,647 people in the township.

== Geography ==
Located in the southeastern corner of the county, it borders the following townships:

- Franklin Township - north
- Newton Township, Miami County - northeast
- Union Township, Miami County - east
- Clay Township, Montgomery County - southeast
- Harrison Township, Preble County - southwest
- Twin Township - west
- Van Buren Township - northwest corner

The village of Pitsburg is located in northwestern Monroe Township.

== Name and history ==
It is one of twenty-two Monroe Townships statewide.

Monroe Township was established in 1836 from land given by Twin Township.

== Government ==
The township is governed by a three-member board of trustees, who are elected in November of odd-numbered years to a four-year term beginning on the following January 1. Two are elected in the year after the presidential election and one is elected in the year before it. There is also an elected township fiscal officer, who serves a four-year term beginning on April 1 of the year after the election, which is held in November of the year before the presidential election. Vacancies in the fiscal officership or on the board of trustees are filled by the remaining trustees.
