= Hand-rearing =

Animal husbandry by humans

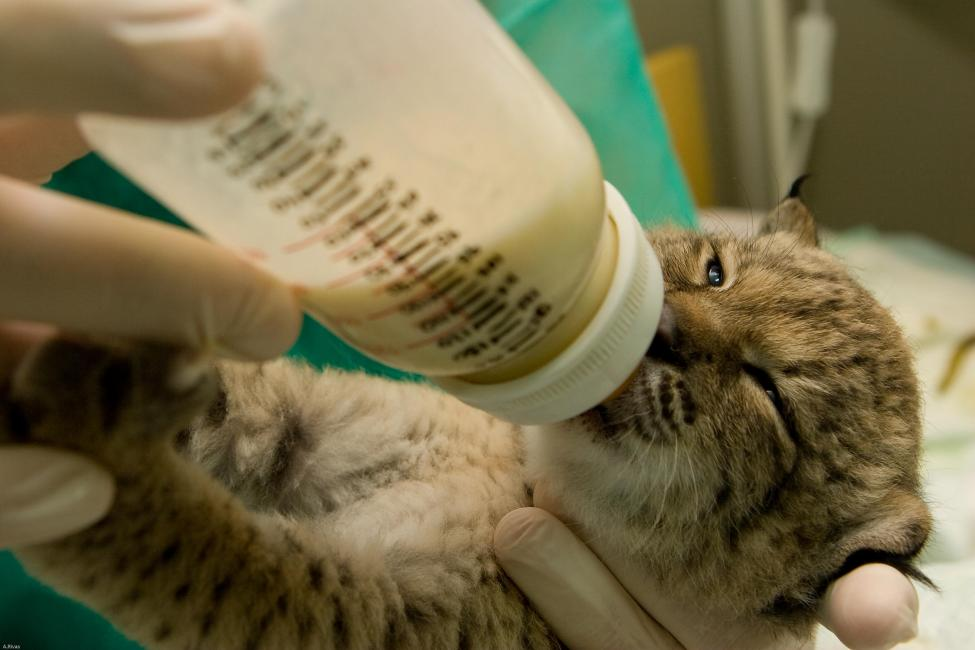
Feeding an Iberian lynx cub with a bottle.

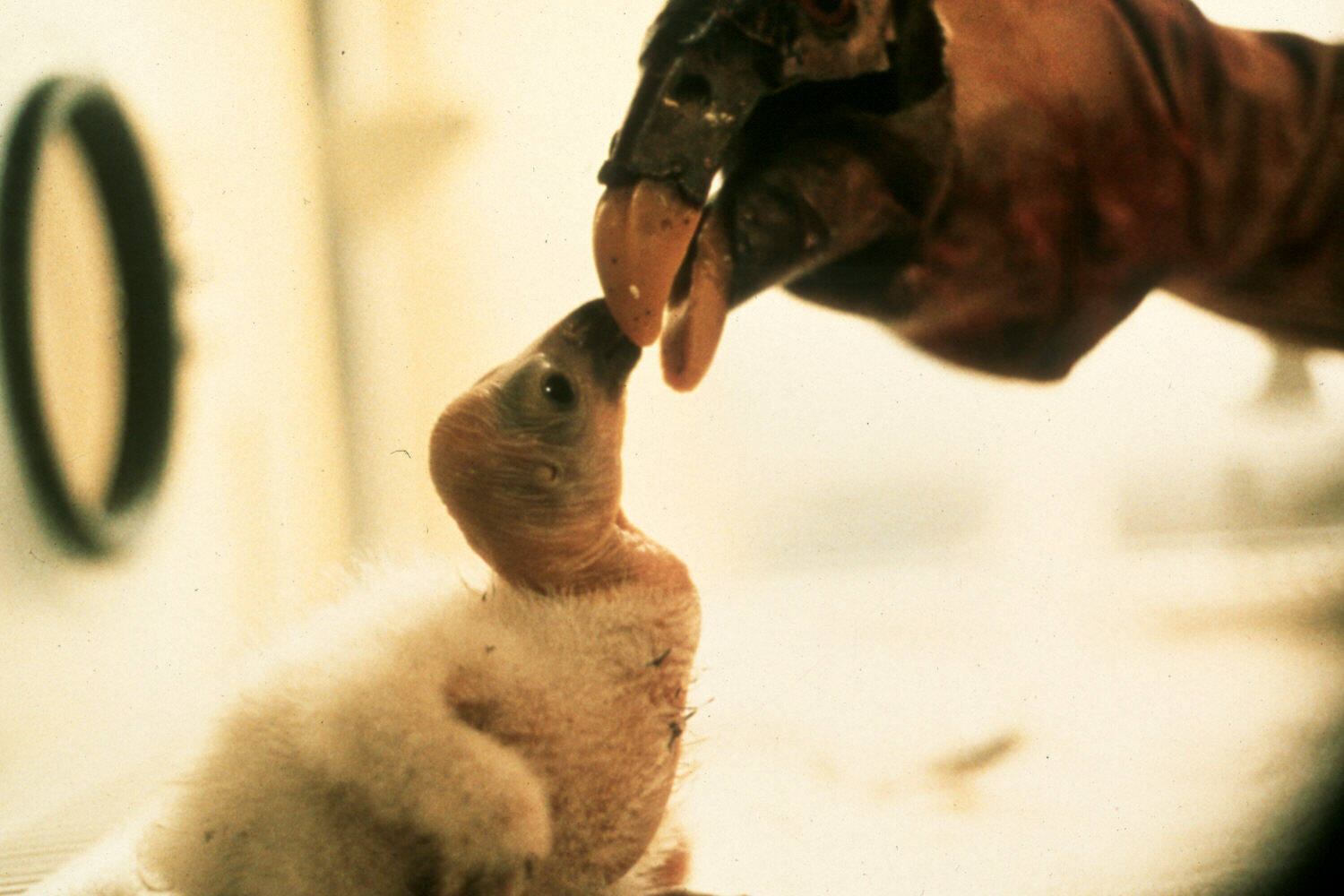
Puppet-feeding of a California condor chick.

Hand-rearing, artificial-rearing, human-rearing or hand-raising is the process of caring for and feeding juvenile animals by humans during a stage when they would normally be fed by their parents.

For the hand-rearing of mammals, a bottle with milk from a female of their species, milk from another closely related species, or an appropriate milk formula can be used.

In the case of birds, in some instances, hand-rearing with puppets that mimic the mother's head with key features to stimulate the chick's beak opening and food ingestion may be necessary.

Hand-rearing can lead to habituation or imprinting of these animals towards humans, with the risk that adults may not exhibit normal behavior towards their species' companions, especially in animals raised for reintroduction into the wild. Potential difficulties include integration into groups of conspecifics, learning natural behaviors such as hunting, choosing a mate, as well as raising their own offspring.

However, in livestock farming and domestic animal breeding, habituating animals to humans can be of great utility.

== See also ==
- Artificial incubation
- Cross-fostering
- Fostering (falconry)
- Hack (falconry)
- Human-guided migration
- Puppet-rearing
