= Human-guided migration =

Technique to restore migratory routes of endangered birds

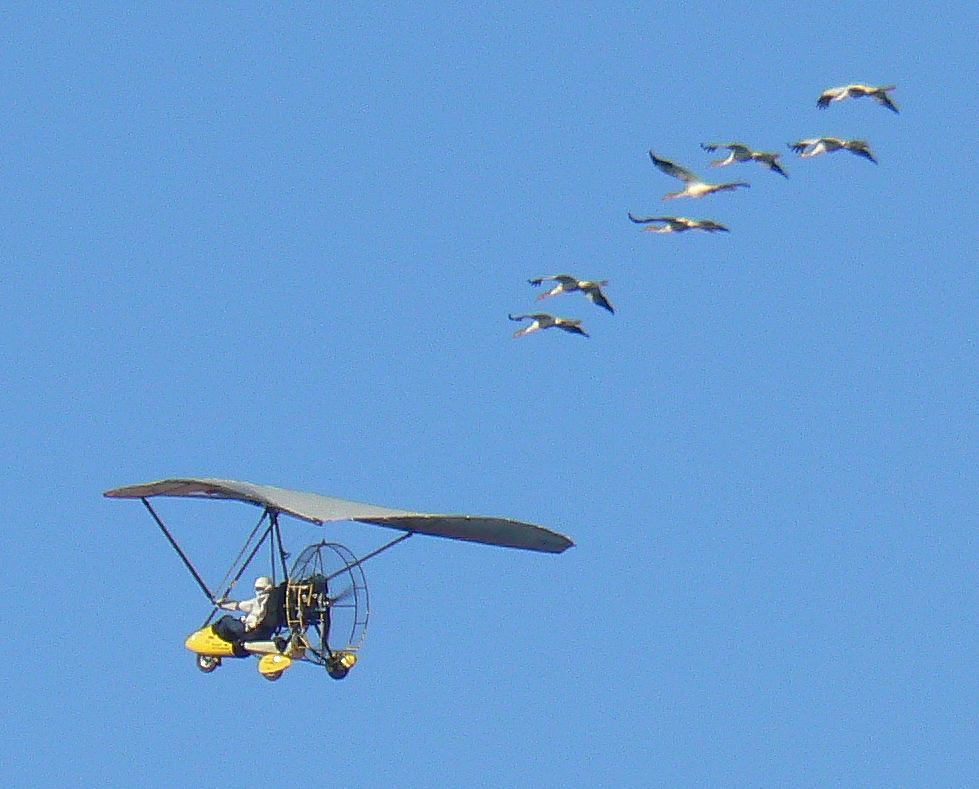
Juvenile whooping cranes completing their first migration from Wisconsin to Florida in January 2009 following an ultralight aircraft

Human-guided migration or human-led migration is a method of restoring migratory routes of birds bred by humans for their reintroduction into the wild.

It is a technique especially used for endangered species in which the loss of individuals and territories has caused the disappearance of their migratory routes. To prevent their extinction, captive breeding has been needed, so their subsequent release into the wild requires teaching these routes to the juveniles.

Hand-reared juveniles have been imprinted on their adoptive parents, whom they follow. After a period of flight training and adaptation to the aircraft and its noise, the juveniles accompany their adoptive parents by flying to their wintering grounds.

This technique has been used in birds such as the northern bald ibis and the whooping crane, among other species.

== See also ==
- Operation Migration
- Cross-fostering
- Fostering (falconry)
- Hack (falconry)
- Hand-rearing
- Puppet-rearing
