= William W. Ullery =

American football player and sports coach (1897–1989)

Biographical details
- Born: May 2, 1897; Bradford, Ohio, U.S.
- Died: December 23, 1989 (aged 92); Harrisburg, Pennsylvania, U.S.

Playing career

Football
- 1919: Penn State
- 1922: Dayton Triangles
- Positions: Fullback, defensive back

Coaching career (HC unless noted)

Football
- 1928–1934: Susquehanna

Basketball
- 1929–1934: Susquehanna

Head coaching record
- Overall: 25–34 (college basketball)

William Warner "Jiggs" Ullery (May 2, 1897 – December 23, 1989) was an American football player and college football and basketball coach. He played one season for the Dayton Triangles of the National Football League (NFL) in 1922.

Ullery served as the head football coach (1928–1934) and head men's basketball coach (1929–1934) at Susquehanna University in Selinsgrove, Pennsylvania.
