= Newberry Township, Miami County, Ohio =

Township in Ohio, US

- Township
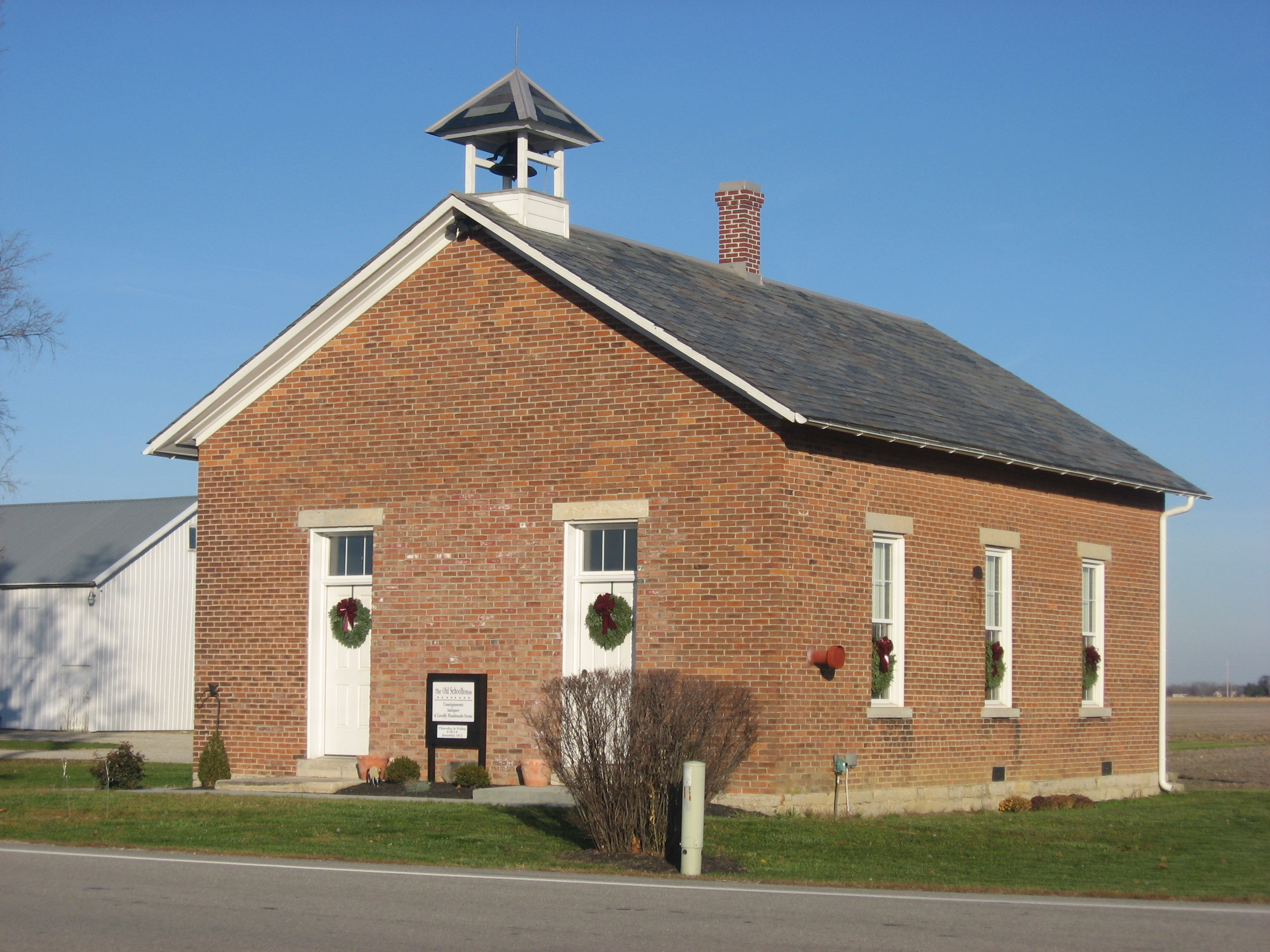
- The former Newberry Township School #14

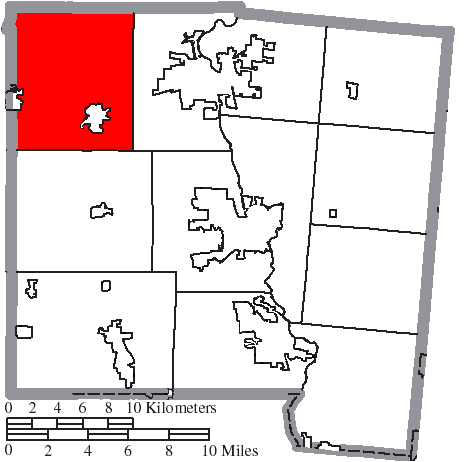
- Location of Newberry Township in Miami County
- Coordinates: 40°8′11″N 84°22′43″W
- Country: United States
- State: Ohio
- County: Miami

Area
  - Total: 42.8 sq mi (110.8 km^{2})
  - Land: 42.4 sq mi (109.9 km^{2})
  - Water: 0.35 sq mi (0.9 km^{2})
- Elevation: 958 ft (292 m)

Population (2020)
  - Total: 6,395
  - Density: 150.7/sq mi (58.19/km^{2})
- Time zone: UTC-5 (Eastern (EST))
  - Summer (DST): UTC-4 (EDT)
- FIPS code: 39-54138
- GNIS feature ID: 1086640

Newberry Township is one of the twelve townships of Miami County, Ohio, United States. The 2020 census found 6,395 people in the township.

== Geography ==
Located in the northwestern corner of the county, it borders the following townships:

- Loramie Township, Shelby County – north
- Washington Township – east
- Newton Township – south
- Franklin Township, Darke County – southwest corner
- Adams Township, Darke County – west
- Wayne Township, Darke County – northwest corner

Two incorporated villages are located in Newberry Township: part of Bradford in the west, and Covington in the southeast.

== Name and history ==
Newberry Township was organized around 1810. It is the only Newberry Township statewide.

== Government ==
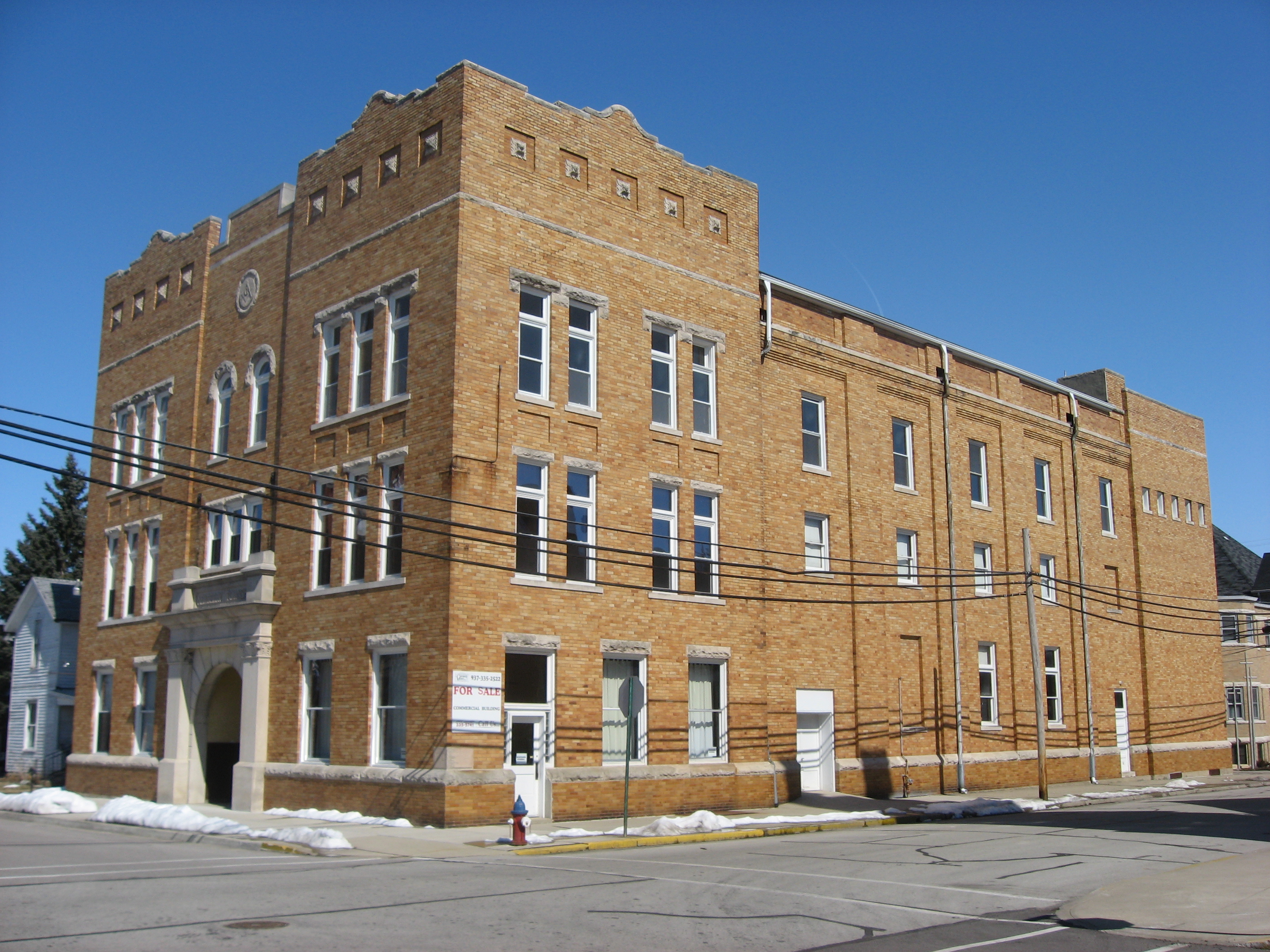
Former township hall in Covington

The township is governed by a three-member board of trustees, who are elected in November of odd-numbered years to a four-year term beginning on the following January 1. Two are elected in the year after the presidential election and one is elected in the year before it. There is also an elected township fiscal officer, who serves a four-year term beginning on April 1 of the year after the election, which is held in November of the year before the presidential election. Vacancies in the fiscal officership or on the board of trustees are filled by the remaining trustees.
