= Webster, Ohio =

Unincorporated community in Ohio, U.S.

Coordinates: 40°11′12″N 84°28′41″W

Webster is an unincorporated community in Darke County, in the U.S. state of Ohio.

== History ==
Webster was laid out in 1835. A post office called Webster was established in 1852, and remained in operation until 1901.
