= On-farm hatching =

Method for hatching chicks on farms

On-farm hatching is the process of hatching incubated eggs on the premises of a farm, as opposed to in a hatchery. On-farm hatched eggs are usually incubated at a hatchery before being transported to a farm a few days before they are due to hatch. Hatching eggs on-farm avoids exposing newly hatched chicks to hatchery and live transport environments. They also gain immediate access to nourishment and other enrichments available in a barn. On-farm hatching may provide several production and welfare benefits, including increased body weight, reduced footpad dermatitis, reducing handling stress, improved intestinal and immunological development, and lower mortality. While on-farm hatching has mostly been developed for use on broiler farms, in-ovo sexing of chicks may make on-farm hatching compatible with layer hen production.

== History ==
In most layer hen and broiler production, chicks are hatched in a hatchery. After incubating for 18 days, the eggs are transferred to a hatching basket that is climatically regulated to ensure suitable conditions for hatching. The chicks then hatch in a 24 to 48 hour window, before they are processed and transported to the farms on which they will be raised. Throughout the hatching and transportation process, chicks can be exposed to "high levels of dust, pathogens and noise and often continuous darkness," and may go up to 3 days without receiving food and water before they reach their farms.

On-farm hatching emerged in Europe as an alternative process for hatching chicks that may offer production and animal welfare benefits. It has been in development at least since 2004.

== Process ==
In most on-farm hatching systems, poultry eggs are incubated in a hatchery until the eighteenth day of incubation, at which point they are transported to their designated farm for hatching. Upon arrival at a farm, a variety of systems are used to hatch the eggs and ensure that newly hatched chicks access nourishment and environmental affordances. Some systems involve placing eggs on litterbeds or biodegradable vessels resembling eggtrays so they hatch at ground level, granting immediate access to food located in the bar. Other systems require that farers install structures holding up hatching trays in the barn from which newly hatched chicks can safely descend once they hatch. A final class of systems require complete barn modifications to install scaffolding, transport and climate control systems that enable a greater use of vertical space within barns while using on-farm hatching.

Because eggs require favorable conditions to hatch, most on-farm hatching systems encourage or require the installation of systems that closely regulate the temperature and humidity in barns. On-farm hatching may also require additional farm labor for chick processing, the collection of unhatched eggs, and identification and euthanization of unviable chicks.

== Effects on production outcomes ==
Studies have mostly found that on-farm hatching is associated with greater animal weight, although with some variation in findings. Two studies comparing the outcomes of chickens hatched using Vencomatic's X-Treck system to chickens hatched in a conventional hatchery with and without nutritional supplement found that on-farm hatched chickens were heavier than traditionally hatched chickens from the time of hatching up to near slaughter age. The increased body weight on on-farm hatched chickens may be one reason that on-farm hatched chickens move less in barns than traditionally hatched chickens. Another study, however, found that on-farm hatched chickens were heavier up to 21 days after hatching, but that weight differences relative to chickens hatched in conventional hatcheries were statistically insignificant thereafter.

On-farm hatching can also affect chicken mortality and reproduction rates. A Belgian study deploying an experiment to analyze the outcomes of chickens hatched on-farm relative to in hatcheries found that on-farm hatching resulted in higher egg hatching rates and lower chicken mortality. The finding on lower total mortality is supported by a quantitative meta-analysis showing that post-hatch food and water deprivation―as may occur when hatching is conducted in a commercial hatchery―is associated with significantly higher total flock mortality across 29 studies.

Improvements to animal health from on-farm hatching can reduce farmer costs on animal health interventions as well as the quantity of antibiotics used in poultry production. In a study of Belgian broiler chicken producers, farms using on-farm hatching methods were found to use 5.6 times less antibiotics than farms receiving already-hatched chickens. Among those that did use antibiotics, farms implementing on-farm hatching also used less antibiotics, especially during the early days of the chickens' lives.

Although less well studied, on-farm hatching may also affect the productivity of layer hens. One analysis found that commercially hatched chicks "laid fewer and smaller eggs than chicks hatched and handled under calm circumstances."

== Effects on animal welfare ==
The European Food Safety Authority recommends on-farm hatching due to its reduction or elimination of the handling stress, resting problems, prolonged thirst, and prolonged hunger experienced by newly-hatched chicks in conventional hatcheries. In conventional hatching, are unable to food and water for up to 72 hours after hatching as they are processed and transported to the farms on which they will be reared. The lack of food and water in the early days of chicks' lives is associated with several detrimental effects on their wellbeing. A meta-analysis of the effects of early feeding on the outcomes of broiler chickens found that post-hatch food and water deprivation was associated with lower body weights up to six weeks of age and higher total mortality after seven weeks (which is about the slaughter age of commercial broiler chickens). In contrast, on-farm hatching provides chicks with immediate access to food and water after hatching. A controlled experiment on the effects of on-farm hatching found that on-farm hatching resulted in lower total chicken mortality.

On-farm hatching may also affect chickens' physiological welfare. One study found that on-farm hatching was strongly associated with lower footpad dermatitis compared to traditionally hatched broiler chickens. The authors speculate that this may be due to reduced litter moisture also observed in another study of on-farm hatching, which also found reduced footpad dermatitis. Post-hatch food and water deprivation has also been shown to cause adverse effects on immunological and gastrointestinal systems of chicks. At the same time, the type of hatching system was not found to have a distinguishable effect on plumage cleanliness, skin lesions, hock burn, or the gait quality of chickens, and layer hens hatched on-farm were in one study found to develop more severe keel bone fractures than those hatched in a conventional hatchery. The authors postulate that the difference in keel bone fracture rates is likely caused by differences in the behaviors adopted by on-farm hatched chickens.

Conventional hatchery environments are prone to developing high levels of dust, pathogenic material, and noise from the operation of machinery and activity of hatched chicks. A study from Linkoping University found that chickens hatched in a conventional hatchery had higher corticosterone levels―a hormone produced during chickens' stress response―than a set of control chicks immediately after hatching and after transport to the farm. On the other hand, layer chicks hatched on-farm had lower corticosterone levels after transport than those first hatched in a hatchery and then transported to the farm.

== Adoption ==
On-farm hatching has mainly been adopted in Europe, the continent on which it was developed. Innovate Animal Ag, a thinktank that publishes research on emerging technologies in animal agriculture, estimates over 500 million broilers are hatched in Europe (primarily using NestBorn and Vencomatic solutions), comprising at least 8% of the market.

Some companies, such as the Belgian retail conglomerate Colruyt Group, have mandated the use of on-farm hatching across its supply chain due to its animal welfare benefits. Crown Farms, a subsidiary of UK food producer Cranswick that focused on chicken production, have also adopted on-farm hatching across its entire supply chain and report improvements in weight gains and the uniformity of the reared chicken. In the US, Perdue Farms is exploring how to incorporate on-farm hatching into their operations due to its potential to improve chick quality and welfare.

On-farm hatching is mostly used in broiler production, but can also be used for layers when combined with in-ovo sexing, which allows for the separation of female and male chicks before the eggs hatch on the farm.
