= Pitsburg, Ohio =

- Village
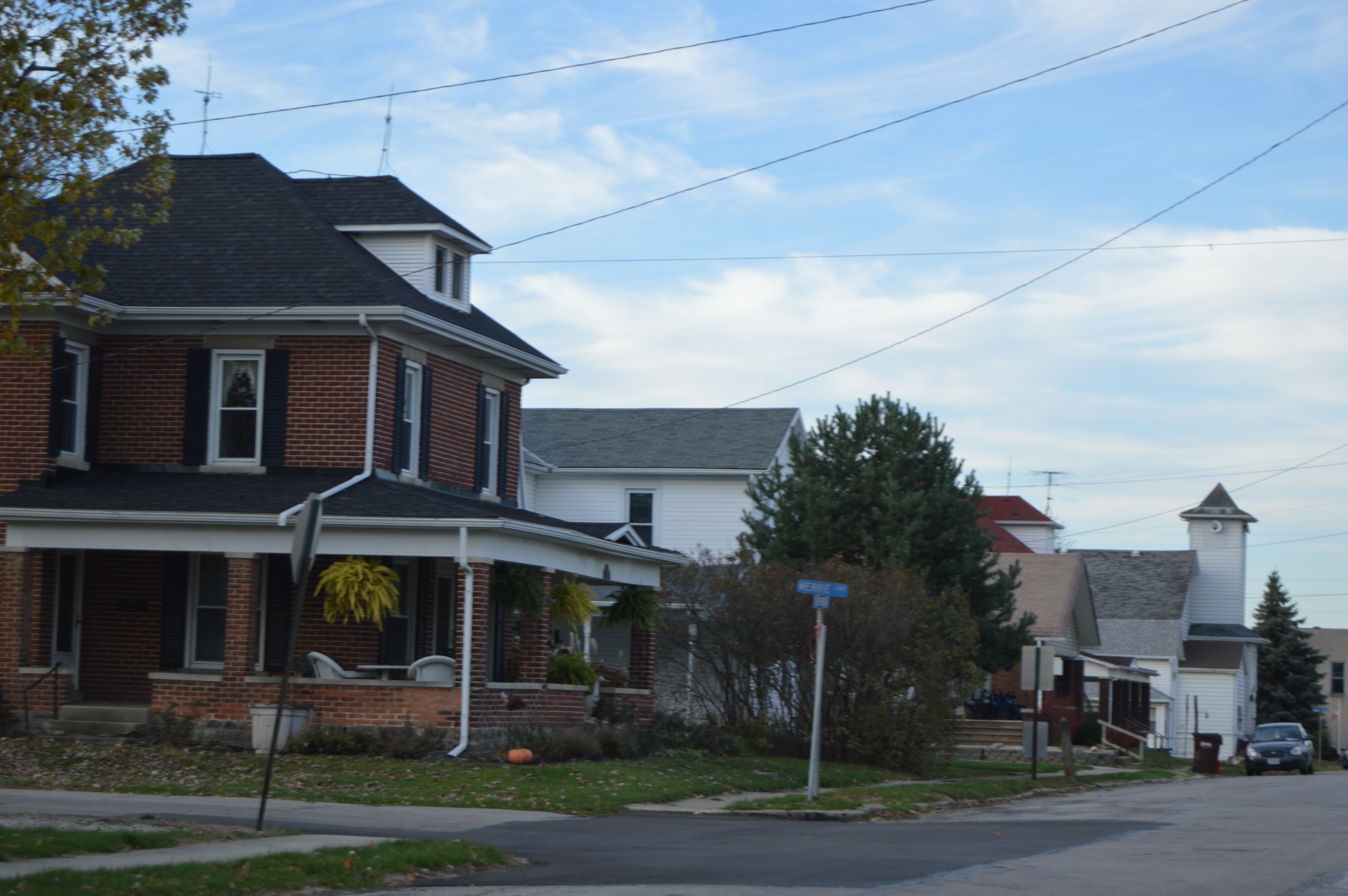
- Jefferson Street south of downtown

- Location in Darke County and the state of Ohio.
- Coordinates: 39°59′14″N 84°29′16″W
- Country: United States
- State: Ohio
- County: Darke
- Township: Monroe

Area
  - Total: 0.17 sq mi (0.44 km^{2})
  - Land: 0.17 sq mi (0.44 km^{2})
  - Water: 0 sq mi (0.00 km^{2})
- Elevation: 1,024 ft (312 m)

Population (2020)
  - Total: 381
  - Density: 2,248.9/sq mi (868.32/km^{2})
- Time zone: UTC-5 (Eastern (EST))
  - Summer (DST): UTC-4 (EDT)
- ZIP code: 45358
- Area codes: 937, 326
- FIPS code: 39-62890
- GNIS feature ID: 2399680

Pitsburg is a village in Monroe Township, Darke County, Ohio, United States. The population was 381 at the 2020 census.

== History ==
Pitsburg was founded under the name of "Arnettsville" in the 19th century, but it languished: an author writing in 1880 described it as "liv[ing] only in name and story." The community revived over the next several decades; by 1914, the village included a school, a Methodist Episcopal church, multiple businesses, and over two hundred residents.

== Geography ==
According to the United States Census Bureau, the village has a total area of 0.19 square miles (0.49 km^{2}), all land.

== Demographics ==
Historical population
| Census | Pop. | Note | %± |
|---|---|---|---|
| 1900 | 157 | | — |
| 1910 | 240 | | 52.9% |
| 1920 | 302 | | 25.8% |
| 1930 | 311 | | 3.0% |
| 1940 | 305 | | −1.9% |
| 1950 | 359 | | 17.7% |
| 1960 | 394 | | 9.7% |
| 1970 | 462 | | 17.3% |
| 1980 | 460 | | −0.4% |
| 1990 | 425 | | −7.6% |
| 2000 | 392 | | −7.8% |
| 2010 | 388 | | −1.0% |
| 2020 | 381 | | −1.8% |
U.S. Decennial Census

=== 2010 census ===
As of the census of 2010, there were 388 people, 148 households, and 113 families living in the village. The population density was 2,042.1 inhabitants per square mile (788.5/km^{2}). There were 160 housing units at an average density of 842.1 per square mile (325.1/km^{2}). The racial makeup of the village was 98.7% White, 0.3% Native American, and 1.0% Asian.

There were 148 households, of which 37.2% had children under the age of 18 living with them, 62.2% were married couples living together, 10.1% had a female householder with no husband present, 4.1% had a male householder with no wife present, and 23.6% were non-families. 20.3% of all households were made up of individuals, and 8.1% had someone living alone who was 65 years of age or older. The average household size was 2.62 and the average family size was 2.98.

The median age in the village was 40.3 years. 27.1% of residents were under the age of 18; 7% were between the ages of 18 and 24; 24.5% were from 25 to 44; 27.6% were from 45 to 64; and 13.9% were 65 years of age or older. The gender makeup of the village was 47.9% male and 52.1% female.

=== 2000 census ===
As of the census of 2000, there were 392 people, 135 households, and 108 families living in the village. The population density was 2,066.5 inhabitants per square mile (797.9/km^{2}). There were 158 housing units at an average density of 832.9 per square mile (321.6/km^{2}). The racial makeup of the village was 97.96% White, 1.28% Native American, 0.26% Pacific Islander, and 0.51% from two or more races. Hispanic or Latino of any race were 0.51% of the population.

There were 135 households, out of which 44.4% had children under the age of 18 living with them, 69.6% were married couples living together, 5.9% had a female householder with no husband present, and 20.0% were non-families. 19.3% of all households were made up of individuals, and 3.7% had someone living alone who was 65 years of age or older. The average household size was 2.90 and the average family size was 3.25.

In the village, the population was spread out, with 36.0% under the age of 18, 6.6% from 18 to 24, 34.4% from 25 to 44, 19.4% from 45 to 64, and 3.6% who were 65 years of age or older. The median age was 28 years. For every 100 females there were 101.0 males. For every 100 females age 18 and over, there were 109.2 males.

The median income for a household in the village was $51,591, and the median income for a family was $62,273. Males had a median income of $44,500 versus $26,563 for females. The per capita income for the village was $18,763. None of the families and 4.0% of the population were living below the poverty line, including no under eighteens and 28.0% of those over 64.
