= Gettysburg, Ohio =

- Village
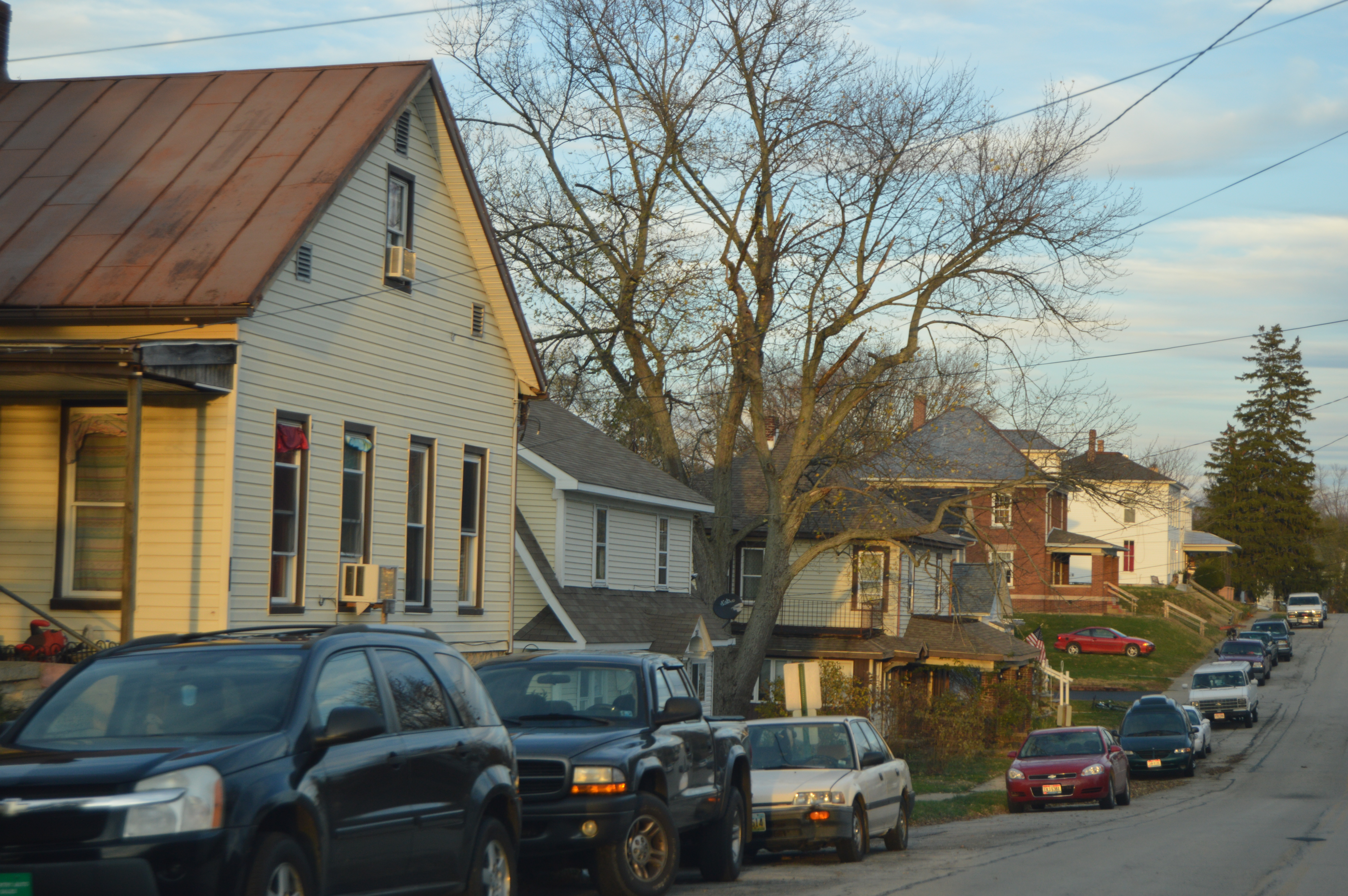
- Houses on Main Street

- Location in Darke County and the state of Ohio.
- Coordinates: 40°07′00″N 84°29′56″W
- Country: United States
- State: Ohio
- County: Darke
- Township: Adams

Area
  - Total: 0.44 sq mi (1.14 km^{2})
  - Land: 0.44 sq mi (1.13 km^{2})
  - Water: 0 sq mi (0.00 km^{2})
- Elevation: 1,007 ft (307 m)

Population (2020)
  - Total: 463
  - Estimate (2023): 461
  - Density: 1,056.7/sq mi (407.99/km^{2})
- Time zone: UTC-5 (Eastern (EST))
  - Summer (DST): UTC-4 (EDT)
- ZIP code: 45328
- Area codes: 937, 326
- FIPS code: 39-29974
- GNIS feature ID: 2398957
- Website: https://villageofgettysburgohio.org/

Gettysburg is a village in Darke County, Ohio, United States. The population was 463 at the 2020 census.

== History ==
Gettysburg was founded by natives of Adams County, Pennsylvania, in the late 1820s. When the settlement was platted by John Hershey in 1842, the community was named for Gettysburg, the county seat of Adams County. The community's first church was a congregation of the Presbyterian Church in the United States of America, established in 1847 or 1848, while the first school was built in 1850.

By the 1860s the village had an active business sector including general stores, shoe shops, cabinet makers, wagon/carriage shops, harness shops, tanning yards, cooperages, blacksmiths, tinning shop, tailors, physicians, a hotel, grain elevator, flouring and saw mills. Several saloons opened but soon failed.

Around 1863 the Richmond and Covington Railroad (becoming part of the Pennsylvania Railroad in 1921) constructed a rail line that ran through Gettysburg. Early in the morning of April 30, 1865, Abraham Lincoln's Funeral Train passed through the village on its journey to his burial place in Springfield, IL.

The railroad turned the town into a busy shipping point for agricultural products. For example, in 1907 one hundred and sixty-eight rail cars of tobacco valued at over one million dollars were shipped out. Also that year 398 carloads of grain valued at $300,000 were shipped from the town's grain elevators. The rail line was abandoned in the 1980s and a portion of the railway corridor is now used for the Tecumseh Trail Multi-use Pathway, a popular recreation trail.

In 1922 Ira Petersime, a local businessman and entrepreneur, invented the electric poultry incubator. In short time Petersime and his son, Ray, built a manufacturing plant in Gettysburg and began shipping their incubators and other hatchery equipment all over the country and abroad. Their business grew to be one of the largest manufacturers of poultry incubators in the world. In 1933 a local historian commented that “the Petersime Incubator Co. put Gettysburg on the map of the world”. The business closed in 2006.

== Geography ==
According to the United States Census Bureau, the village has a total area of 0.44 square miles (1.14 km^{2}), all land.

== Demographics ==
Historical population
Census	Pop.	Note	%±
1870	228		—
1880	292		28.1%
1890	274		−6.2%
1900	246		−10.2%
1910	320		30.1%
1920	375		17.2%
1930	418		11.5%
1940	440		5.3%
1950	451		2.5%
1960	443		−1.8%
1970	526		18.7%
1980	545		3.6%
1990	539		−1.1%
2000	558		3.5%
2010	513		−8.1%
2020	463		−9.7%
2023 (est.)	461	▼	−0.4%
U.S. Decennial Census

=== 2010 census ===
As of the census of 2010, there were 513 people, 170 households, and 127 families living in the village. The population density was 1,165.9 inhabitants per square mile (450.2/km^{2}). There were 194 housing units at an average density of 440.9 per square mile (170.2/km^{2}). The racial makeup of the village was 97.5% White, 0.4% African American, 0.2% Asian, 0.2% from other races, and 1.8% from two or more races. Hispanic or Latino of any race were 0.6% of the population.

There were 170 households, of which 44.1% had children under the age of 18 living with them, 55.3% were married couples living together, 12.4% had a female householder with no husband present, 7.1% had a male householder with no wife present, and 25.3% were non-families. 20.6% of all households were made up of individuals, and 4.1% had someone living alone who was 65 years of age or older. The average household size was 3.02 and the average family size was 3.44.

The median age in the village was 32.7 years. 32.4% of residents were under the age of 18; 8% were between the ages of 18 and 24; 26.3% were from 25 to 44; 23.8% were from 45 to 64; and 9.6% were 65 years of age or older. The gender makeup of the village was 49.1% male and 50.9% female.

=== 2000 census ===
As of the census of 2000, there were 558 people, 187 households, and 149 families living in the village. The population density was 1,267.7 inhabitants per square mile (489.5/km^{2}). There were 201 housing units at an average density of 456.6 per square mile (176.3/km^{2}). The racial makeup of the village was 96.24% White, 0.72% African American, 0.36% Native American, 0.90% Asian, and 1.79% from two or more races. Hispanic or Latino of any race were 0.72% of the population.

There were 187 households, out of which 44.4% had children under the age of 18 living with them, 61.5% were married couples living together, 15.5% had a female householder with no husband present, and 19.8% were non-families. 16.0% of all households were made up of individuals, and 5.9% had someone living alone who was 65 years of age or older. The average household size was 2.98 and the average family size was 3.29.

In the village, the population was spread out, with 34.8% under the age of 18, 7.9% from 18 to 24, 30.8% from 25 to 44, 17.4% from 45 to 64, and 9.1% who were 65 years of age or older. The median age was 30 years. For every 100 females there were 93.8 males. For every 100 females age 18 and over, there were 91.6 males.

The median income for a household in the village was $36,250, and the median income for a family was $43,750. Males had a median income of $29,773 versus $21,875 for females. The per capita income for the village was $15,247. About 7.2% of families and 10.7% of the population were below the poverty line, including 17.9% of those under age 18 and none of those age 65 or over.
