= Boreal Plains Ecozone =

Ecozone in western Canada

Boreal Plains
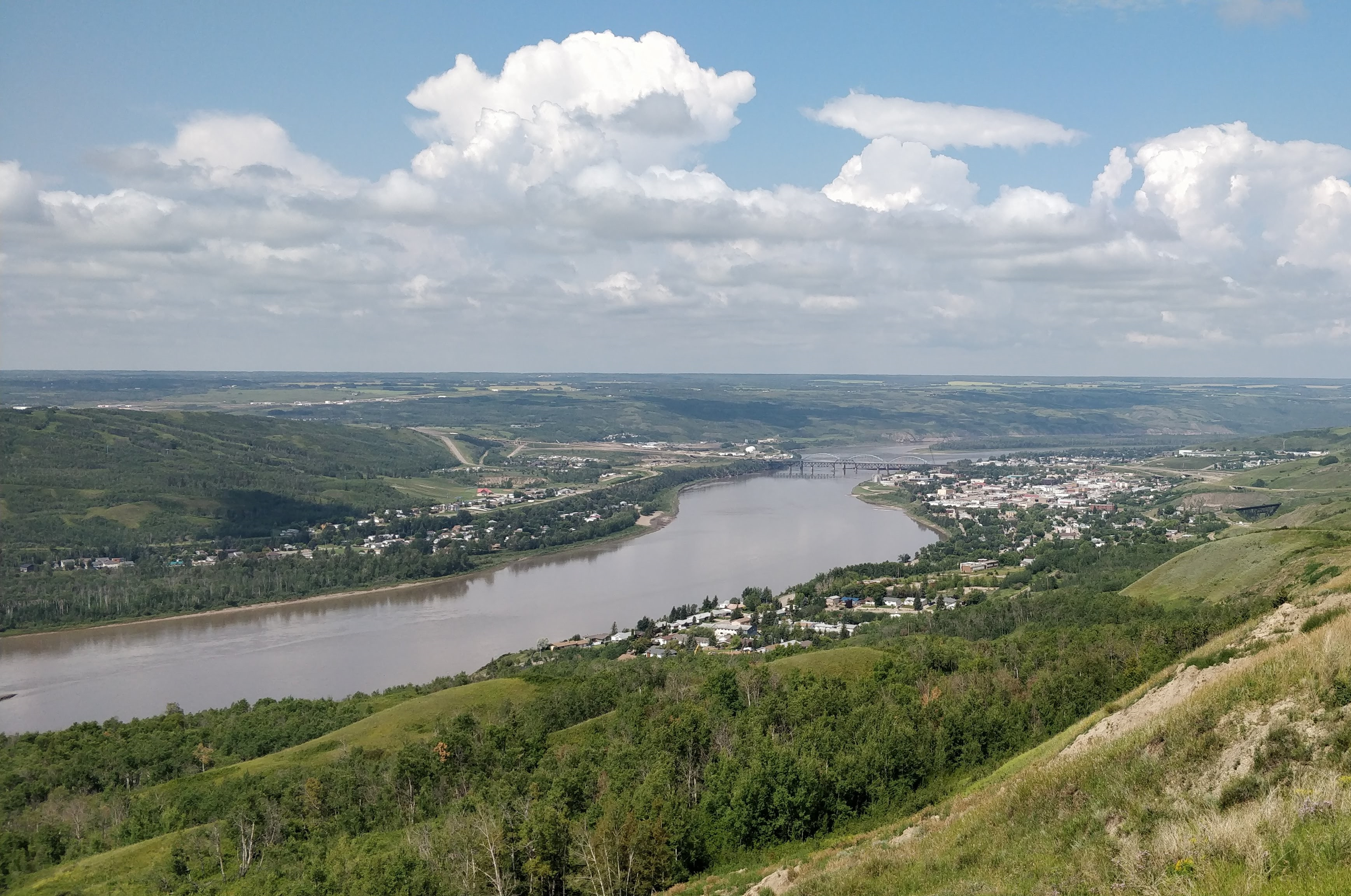
- Peace Lowland ecoregion of the Boreal Plains ecozone

Ecology
- Borders: List: Boreal Cordillera; Boreal Shield; Montane Cordillera; Prairies; Taiga Plains; Taiga Shield

Geography
- Area: 737,287 km^{2} (284,668 mi^{2})
- Country: Canada
- Provinces: Alberta; British Columbia; Manitoba; Northwest Territories; Saskatchewan
- Climate type: Humid continental and subarctic

The Boreal Plains Ecozone, as defined by the Commission for Environmental Cooperation (CEC), is a terrestrial ecozone in the western Canadian provinces of Manitoba, Saskatchewan and Alberta. It also has minor extensions into northeastern British Columbia and south-central Northwest Territories. The region extends over 779,471 km^{2}, of which 58,981 km^{2} is conserved (7.6 percent).

Wood Buffalo National Park, the largest national park in Canada, and Whooping Crane Summer Range, the only nesting and breeding area for the critically endangered whooping crane, are both located in the northern portion of this ecozone.

Industry in this ecozone once consisted primarily of forestry and agriculture, but in 1967 Great Canadian Oil Sands Limited began extracting bitumen from the Athabasca oil sands. Operations there have expanded significantly since 2003, and the oil sands are becoming an increasingly significant economic factor in the region.

== Geography ==
Overlaying a bedrock of Cretaceous shale and Tertiary sediments are thick deposits of soil that form a flat terrain in the Interior Plains. It borders the Montane Cordillera to the west, closely following the border between Alberta and British Columbia. To its south is the Prairies ecozone for its entire extent, while to the north are the Taiga Plains, with its northeastern periphery adjacent to the Taiga Shield. 20 sub-region are located within the ecoregion.

Covering 650,000 square kilometres (250,000 sq mi), it is a region of subdued relief with few lakes. However, meltwater from glacial retreat between 11,000 and 8,000 years ago resulted in extensive deltas and dunes, forming Lake Winnipegosis at the eastern end of this zone. It is a remnant of Lake Agassiz, a large glacial lake. Most rivers originate in the Rocky Mountains, flowing eastward through the zone.

Oil, Forestry, and agriculture are the largest industries. The region is nearly covered by timber, about 84% of the region, The Athabasca oil sands area around 141,000 square kilometres (54,000 sq mi) of land. Agriculture takes place mainly in the Peace River Country in Alberta and British Columbia. This can employ up to 20% of the land area, though it is typically less than that. Large communities include, Fort St. John, Grande Prairie, Fort McMurray, Hayriver, La Ronge, and The Pas.

=== Ecoprovinces ===
This ecozone can be further subdivided into three ecoprovinces:

- Boreal Foothills
- Central Boreal Plains
- Eastern Boreal Plains

== Climate ==
Lying east of the Rocky Mountains, the region experiences low precipitation, averaging 450 millimetres (18 in) annually, with 300 millimetres (12 in) in the west and 650 millimetres (26 in) in the east. However, this is greater than the rate of evaporation by over 100 millimetres (3.9 in) in the south, and 300 millimetres (12 in) in the north and at the foothills of the Rockies. The excess moisture promotes the development of wetlands and peat bogs, which account for between 25–50% of the ecozone's area.

Summers are moderately warm, with mean July temperatures of 13 to 15 °C (55 to 59 °F), whereas winters may be very cold, with mean January temperatures of −17.5 to −11 °C (0.5 to 12.2 °F).

== EcoRegions ==
Each province continues to work on defining subregions within the larger national ecozone system.

The Alberta Natural Subregion – Natural Regions (2006) found within this ecozone are:

- Peace River Parkland – Parkland
- Dry Mixedwood – Boreal Forest
- Central Mixedwood – Boreal Forest
- Peace-Athabasca Delta – Boreal Forest

The Manitoba Ecoregions within this ecozone are:

- Mid-Boreal Lowland Ecoregion
- Boreal Transition Ecoregion
- Mid-Boreal Uplands Ecoregion
- Interlake Plain Ecoregion

The Saskatchewan Ecoregions within this ecozone are:

- Mid-Boreal Upland
- Mid-Boreal Lowland
- Boreal Transition

== Protected areas ==
A number of protected areas have been established to protect representative and/or significant portions of this ecozone. These include:

=== Alberta ===
- Cross Lake Provincial Park
- Dunvegan Provincial Park
- Elk Island National Park
- Lakeland Provincial Park
- Thunder Lake Provincial Park
- Wood Buffalo National Park including the Whooping Crane Summer Range

=== Manitoba ===
- Birch Island Provincial Park
- Birds Hill Provincial Park
- Brokenhead Wetland Ecological Reserve
- Clearwater Lake Provincial Park
- Chitek Lake Anishinaabe Provincial Park
- Duck Mountain Provincial Park
- Dog Lake Wildlife Management Area
- Elk Island Provincial Park
- Fisher Bay Provincial Park
- Grand Island Provincial Park
- Goose Islands Provincial Park
- Grass River Provincial Park
- Hecla-Grindstone Provincial Park
- Hilbre Wildlife Management Area
- Kinwow Bay Provincial Park
- Little Birch Wildlife Management Area
- Little Limestone Lake Provincial Park
- Long Point Ecological Reserve
- Mars Hill Wildlife Management Area
- Narcisse Wildlife Management Area
- Palsa Hazel Ecological Reserve
- Peonan Point Wildlife Management Area
- Proulx Lake Wildlife Management Area
- Red Deer Lake Wildlife Management Area
- Reindeer Island Ecological Reserve
- St. Malo Wildlife Management Area
- Ste. Anne Bog Ecological Reserve
- Sleeve Lake Wildlife Management Area
- Stuartburn Wildlife Management Area
- Rat River Wildlife Management Area
- Riding Mountain National Park
- Sturgeon Bay Provincial Park
- Walter Cook Caves Ecological Reserve
- Watson P. Davidson Wildlife Management Area

=== Saskatchewan ===
- Duck Mountain Provincial Park
- Greenwater Lake Provincial Park
- Meadow Lake Provincial Park
- Narrow Hills Provincial Park
- Prince Albert National Park
