= Birch Island Provincial Park =

Provincial park in Manitoba

- IUCN category II (national park)
- Birch Island

- Location within Manitoba
- Interactive map of Birch Island Provincial Park
- Location: Manitoba, Canada
- Nearest town: Dauphin, Manitoba
- Coordinates: 52°23′23″N 99°57′17″W
- Area: 80,600 ha (311 sq mi)
- Established: 2010
- Governing body: Government of Manitoba

Birch Island Provincial Park is a remote provincial park located on Lake Winnipegosis in Manitoba, Canada. The park is bordered on its western boundary by the Swan-Pelican Provincial Forest and on its eastern side by Chitek Lake Anishinaabe Provincial Park.

Surface bedrock on Birch Island is Devonian limestone and dolomite. The Keewatin Glacier contributed a 4 foot layer of ground moraine. Post-glacial Lake Agassiz gradually drained away leaving the modern group of lakes, Lake Winnipeg, Lake Winnipegosis and Lake Manitoba. Soils on the island are classified as eutric brunisol.

Birch Island supports coniferous forest of jack pine and black spruce. Black spruce muskeg is found in the poorly drained areas. Moose, black bear, wolf, lynx, snowshoe hares and white-tailed deer are residential mammals of this park. Herons, terns and double-crested cormorants use Birch Island and the nearby small islands and shallows as nesting habitat.

The area was first set aside as a park reserve in May 2000 to prepare for the park designation. The area was designated a provincial park by the Government of Manitoba on November 1, 2010. The park is 80,600 hectares (311 sq mi) in size. It is considered to be a Class II protected area under the IUCN protected area management categories. The park is located within the Pelican Lake Ecodistrict in the Mid-Boreal Lowland Ecoregion within the Boreal Plains Ecozone.

Hunting, fishing and other gathering activities are permitted but the park designation as backcountry prevents other types of development including logging, mining and hydroelectric development. There are no services within the park.

== See also ==
- List of protected areas of Manitoba
