= Whitemouth River Ecological Reserve =

Protected area in Manitoba, Canada

Coordinates: 49.469°N 95.733°W

- IUCN category Ia (strict nature reserve)
- Interactive map of Whitemouth River Ecological Reserve
- Area: 130 ha (320 acres)
- Established: 1986

Whitemouth River Ecological Reserve is an ecological reserve located within the Sandilands Provincial Forest, Manitoba, Canada. It was established in 1986 under the Manitoba Ecological Reserves Act. It is 1.3 square kilometres (0.50 sq mi) in size.

== See also ==
- List of ecological reserves in Manitoba
- List of protected areas of Manitoba
- Whitemouth Island Ecological Reserve
