= Lake Winnipegosis Salt Flats Ecological Reserve =

Protected area in Manitoba, Canada

- IUCN category Ia (strict nature reserve)
- Area: 4,725 ha (18.24 sq mi)
- Established: 1992

Lake Winnipegosis Salt Flats Ecological Reserve is an ecological reserve located on the west of Lake Winnipegosis, Manitoba, Canada. It was established in 1992 under the Manitoba Ecological Reserves Act. It is 47.25 square kilometres (18.24 sq mi) in size.

== See also ==
- List of ecological reserves in Manitoba
- List of protected areas of Manitoba
