= Oak Hammock Marsh =

Marsh in Manitoba, Canada

- Oak Hammock Marsh Wildlife Management Area
- IUCN category IV (habitat/species management area)
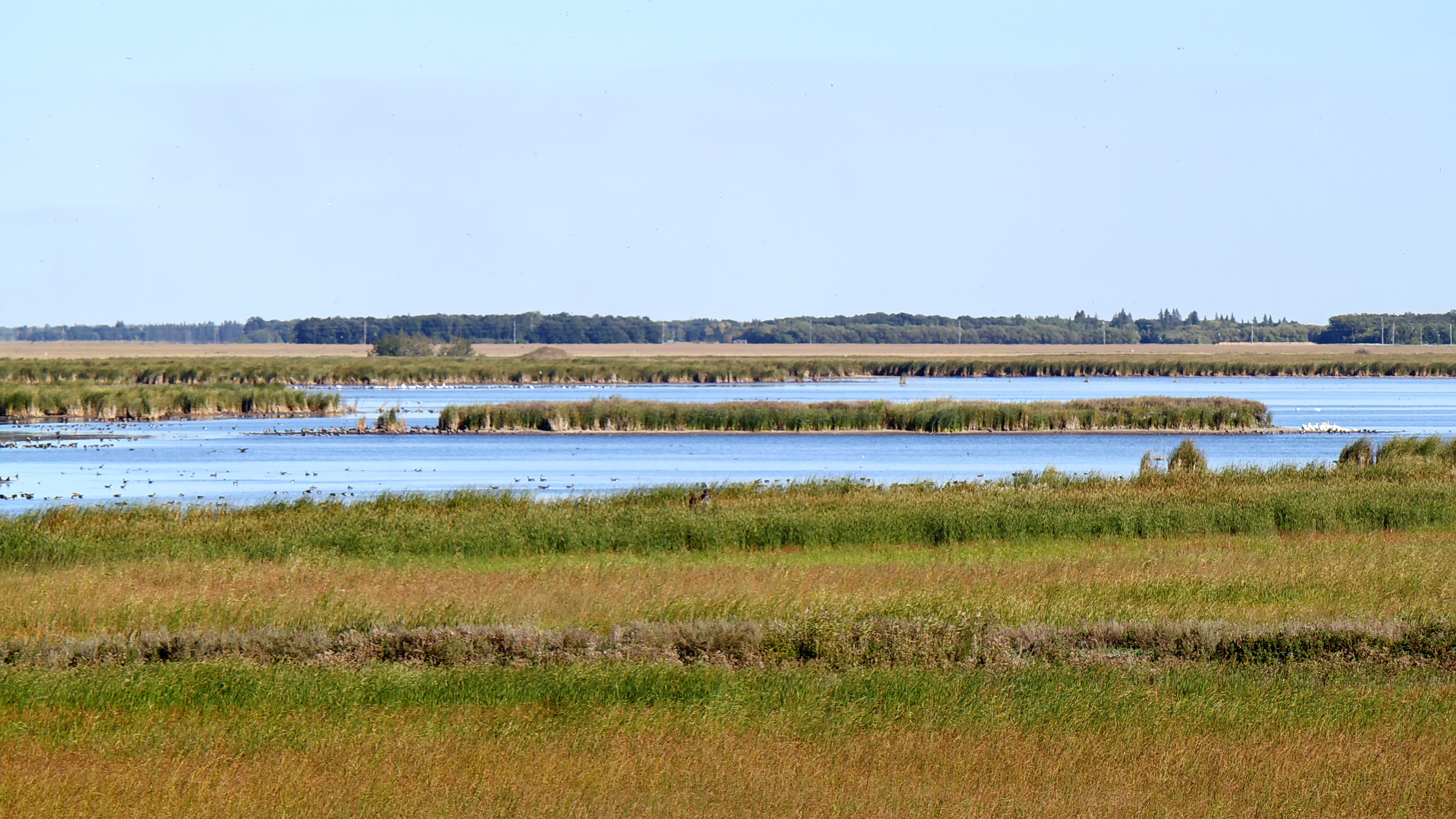
- Interactive map of Oak Hammock Marsh
- Location: Rural Municipality of Rockwood / Rural Municipality of St. Andrews
- Nearest town: Stonewall, Manitoba
- Coordinates: 50°11′18″N 97°8′12″W
- Area: 35.8 square kilometres (13.8 sq mi)
- Established: 1973
- Governing body: Government of Manitoba

Ramsar Wetland
- Designated: 27 May 1987
- Reference no.: 366

Oak Hammock WMA

Oak Hammock Marsh is a marsh and a wildlife management area located 34 kilometres (21 mi) north of Winnipeg, Manitoba, Canada. The WMA is considered to be a Class IV protected area under the IUCN protected area management categories. The marsh is recognized as an Important Bird Area (IBA) for its globally significant numbers of waterfowl and shorebirds. It is a designated Ramsar site due to its international importance as a breeding and staging area for waterfowl and other migratory birds. It is 3,578.47 hectares (8,842.6 acres) in size.

== History ==
The marsh is a remnant of an 470 sq km area of marsh and fen that extended from the edge of Winnipeg and north to Teulon, Manitoba and west to the south-western corner of Lake Winnipeg. This marshland was previously known in English as St. Andrews Bog. The name of Oak Hammock dates back to the early 1870s when settlers used to gather for picnics on an oak covered knoll on the edge of this bog. The land was owned by Aaron MacDonald and the name of Oak Hammock for which he named the area eventually stuck. This name became official with the opening of the Oak Hammock Post Office which was used until the early 1900s.

This wetland underwent drainage for agricultural purposes beginning in 1897 and by the early 1960s all but 60 ha had been drained. Measures to restore a portion of the wetland began in 1967 when the Governments of Manitoba and Canada embarked on a cooperative program with Ducks Unlimited Canada and other wildlife conservation organizations to restore marginal agricultural lands to a state suitable for wildlife. In 1972 the province worked with Ducks Unlimited to build a network of dykes and by 1974, 3,450 ha of land had been purchased and 22 km of dykes built to trap and hold water in three dyke-separated marsh compartments. 58 nesting islands were also constructed within the three compartments. This area along with surrounding uplands were all arranged by the province and designated into the Oak Hammock Marsh Wildlife Management Area (WMA) in an area approximately 3,600 square hectares or 36 square kilometres (14 mi^{2}). This area continues to be operated by Manitoba Conservation and Climate.

In 1984, the Manitoba government signed a further development agreement with Ducks Unlimited Canada to construct water control structures, water supply works, more nesting islands, additional dykes, and create a fourth compartment. The construction of a conservation and reception centre took place in 1991 at a cost of CA$11 million and serves as Ducks Unlimited Canada's national headquarters, as well as the Harry J. Enns Wetland Discovery Centre. This building was officially opened in 1993, 20 years after the original restoration of the marsh.

== Geography ==
Oak Hammock Marsh consists of approximately 20 square kilometres (7.7 sq mi) of open marsh, and a slightly smaller area of surrounding woods and grasslands. It is located near the town of Stonewall, Manitoba in the Rural Municipality of Rockwood.

The marsh is a re-constructed and managed wetland, designed for the creation of a waterfowl breeding and migratory habitat. Water levels in the marsh are carefully controlled. It is common during wet years (when waterfowl have an abundance of alternative nesting sites) for the water level in one or more of the compartments to be lowered for the summer, creating an extensive area of dried mudflats. This drying and later reflooding promotes the growth of emergent marsh plants such as bulrush and cattail, and therefore maintains the vegetation cover of the marsh; otherwise, the natural tendency would be for the marsh to become over several years simply a shallow lake, with a sharply defined shoreline and little nesting cover. Furthermore, not all of the adjacent purchased land has been allowed to grow wild. Cereal grain crops are planted in some of it, in order to supply migrating waterfowl with an autumn food supply while reducing crop losses on local farms.

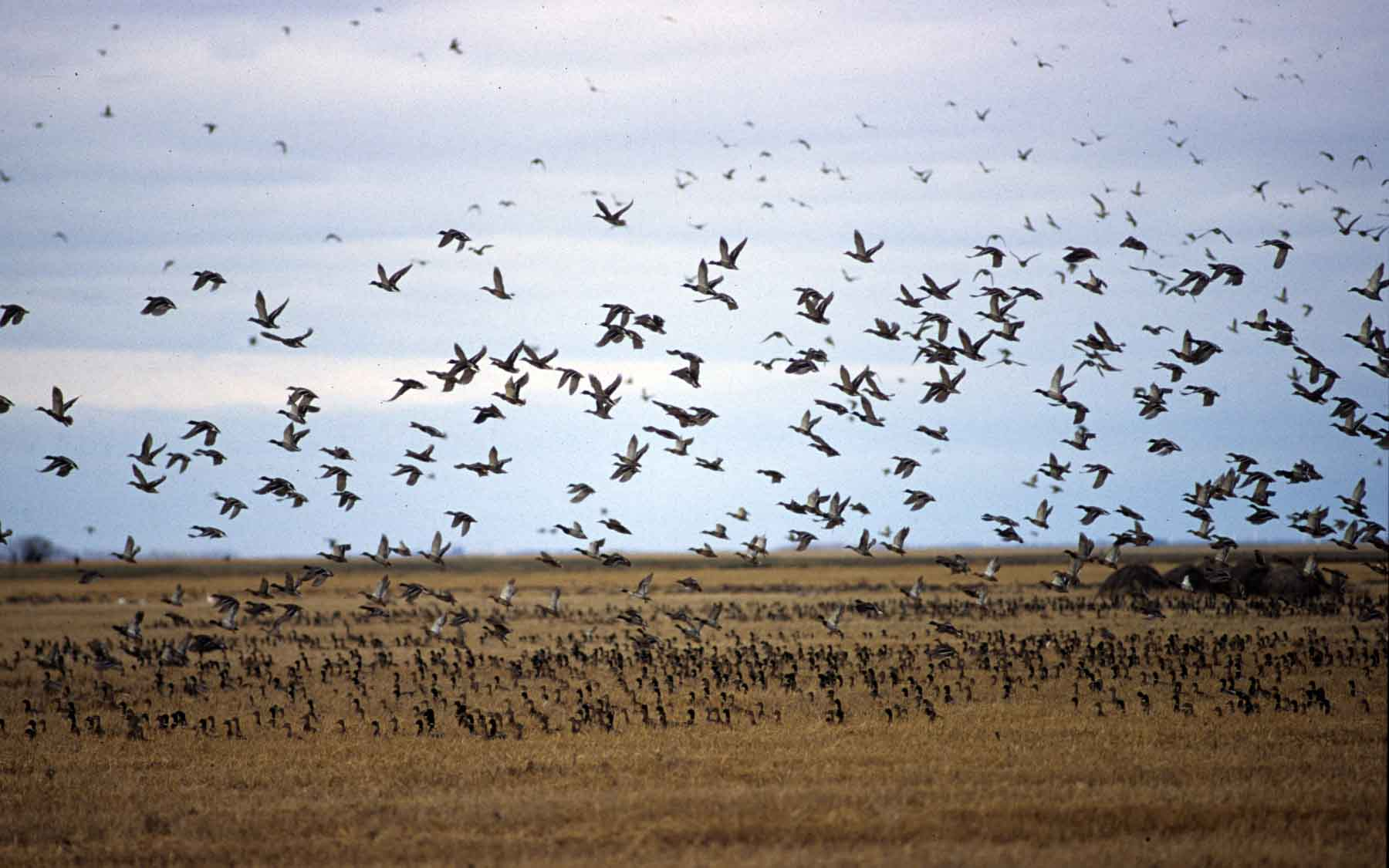
Mallards in the fall feed on grain missed by the harvester.

== Conservation ==
The marsh itself is closed to hunting, but game birds (primarily mallards, snow geese, and Canada geese) are hunted in the autumn when they leave the marsh to feed in the surrounding grain fields. Waterfowl receive further protection in the form of a buffer zone extending 1 km from the water inside which hunting is prohibited, this protection extends outside of the WMA in some locations.

== Ecology ==
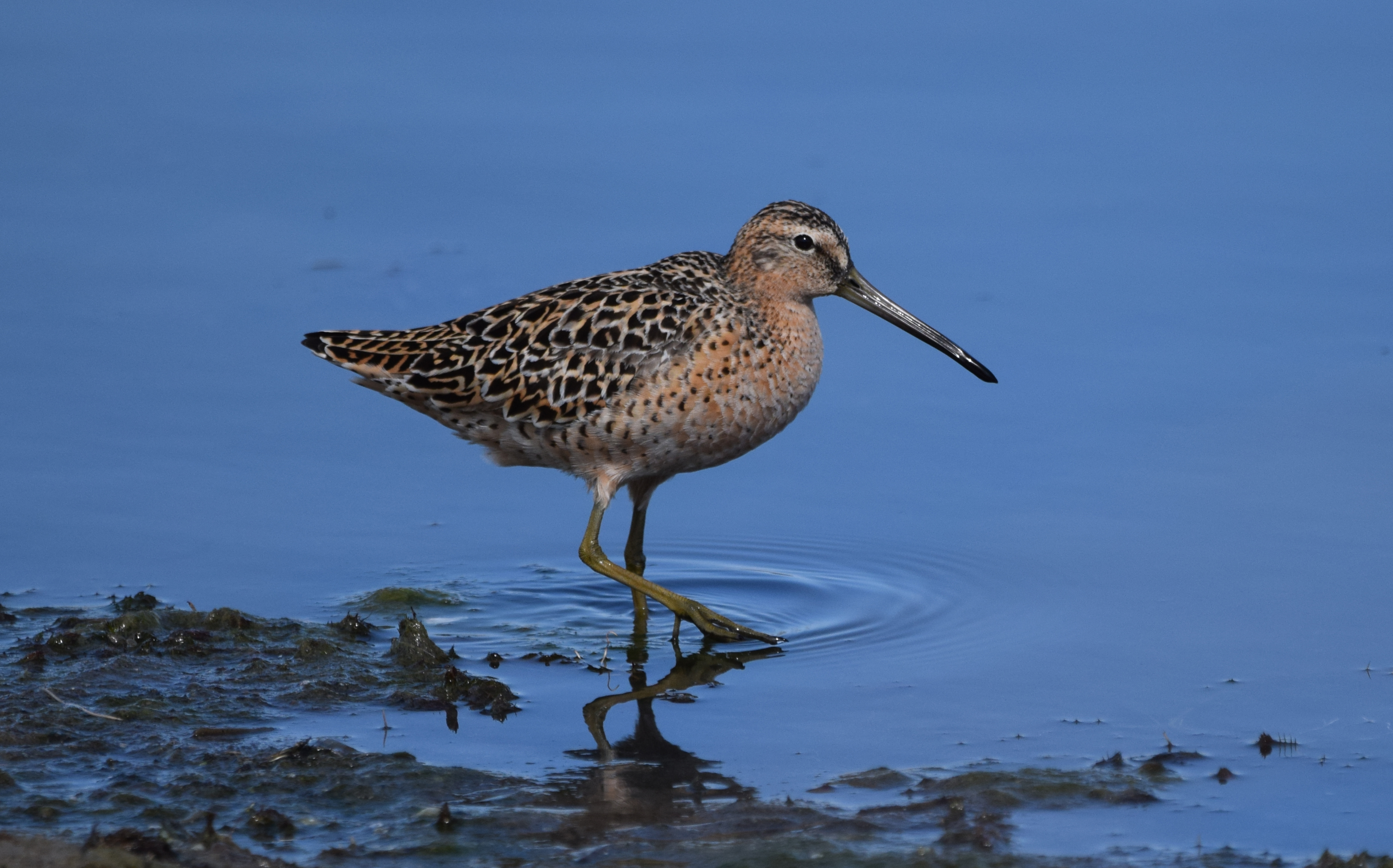
A Short-billed dowitcher on spring migration forages in a mudflat.

=== Spring and fall migration ===
More than 280 species of birds have been reported from the area, many of them during the spring and fall migrations. Numbers of staging waterfowl peak in early October when more than 300,000 ducks and geese may be present. Other species gathering in large numbers in the fall include Yellow-headed blackbird, Red-winged blackbird, and Bank swallow.

The area is an important migration support for several shorebird species—White-rumped sandpiper, Short-billed dowitcher, Hudsonian godwit— as well as Sandhill crane, American white pelican, and Tundra swan.

Snowy owl, Short-eared owl, Bald eagle, and Northern harrier can be seen in the fall and into winter.

=== Breeding birds ===
More than 90 species of birds are known to have bred at Oak Hammock Marsh. Colonial nesters represented by significant numbers include Franklin's gull, Black tern, Forster's tern, Black-crowned night heron, and Herring gull. Upland nesters include Blue-winged teal, Northern shoveler and Northern pintail. Nesting islands and wetland edges are utilized by Mallard, Gadwall, Canvasback, Redhead, Lesser scaup, Ruddy duck, Western grebe and Eared grebe.

=== Plants ===
Cattails, bulrushes and common reed are frequent in the flooded impoundments. Willow clumps grow in drier areas. Some areas that were previously under cultivation are planted with nesting cover, while lure crops are grown in others. The Brennan Prairie is found on the west side of the WMA. In the southeastern corner, a second tall grass prairie remnant abuts an area of aspen-oak forest.

More than 100 species are found in the area, including big bluestem, little bluestem, switchgrass, prairie cord grass, needle and thread grass, prairie lily, golden Alexanders, and blazingstar.

== See also ==
- List of wildlife management areas in Manitoba
- List of protected areas of Manitoba
