= Cedar Bog Ecological Reserve =

Protected area in Manitoba, Canada

Coordinates: 49.621°N 96.168°W

- IUCN category Ia (strict nature reserve)
- Interactive map of Cedar Bog Ecological Reserve
- Area: 110 ha (270 acres)
- Established: 2015

Cedar Bog Ecological Reserve is an ecological reserve located in Sandilands Provincial Forest, Manitoba, Canada. It was established in 2015 under the Manitoba Ecological Reserves Act. It is 1.1 square kilometres (0.42 sq mi) in size.

== See also ==
- List of ecological reserves in Manitoba
- List of protected areas of Manitoba
