= Basket Lake Wildlife Management Area =

Protected area in Manitoba, Canada

- Interactive map of Basket Lake Wildlife Management Area
- Nearest city: Dauphin
- Coordinates: 51°48′59″N 99°3′4″W
- Area: 7,260 hectares (28.0 sq mi)
- Established: 1974

Basket Lake Wildlife Management Area (WMA) is a provincially designated protected area in Manitoba. It is located north of Lake Manitoba and west of Hwy 6. It was designated under the Manitoba Wildlife Act by the Government of Manitoba in 1974. It is 7,260 hectares (28.0 sq mi) in size. The WMA is named after 'Basket Lake', a shallow lake surrounded by marsh, located in its southern portion.

The WMA provides habitat for mammals such as whitetail deer, elk, moose, black bear, wolf and coyote. Birds found in the area include sharptail grouse, ruffed grouse, spruce grouse, sandhill crane, great blue heron, ring-billed gulls, several grebe species and other waterfowl. Other animals found in the park include garter snakes and several species of frogs.

The WMA is located within the Waterhen Ecodistrict in the Interlake Plain Ecoregion, which is part of the Boreal Plains Ecozone.

== See also ==
- List of protected areas of Manitoba
