= Wampum Ecological Reserve =

Protected area in Manitoba, Canada

Coordinates: 49.042°N 95.884°W

- IUCN category Ia (strict nature reserve)
- Interactive map of Wampum Ecological Reserve
- Area: 62 ha (150 acres)
- Established: 1978

Wampum Ecological Reserve is an ecological reserve located within Sandilands Provincial Forest, Manitoba, Canada. It was established in 1978 under the Manitoba Crown Lands Act. It is 0.62 square kilometres (0.24 sq mi) in size.

== See also ==
- List of ecological reserves in Manitoba
- List of protected areas of Manitoba
