= Whitemud Watershed Wildlife Management Area =

Wildlife management area in Manitoba, Canada

- IUCN category III (natural monument or feature)
- Interactive map of Whitemud Watershed Wildlife Management Area
- Coordinates: 50°2′40″N 99°12′55″W
- Area: 3,517 ha (13.58 sq mi)
- Established: 1998

Whitemud Watershed Wildlife Management Area is a wildlife management area made up of several widely spaced units in the upper reaches of the watershed of the Whitemud River, Manitoba, Canada. It was established in 1998 under the Manitoba Wildlife Act. It is 35.17 square kilometres (13.58 sq mi) in size.

== See also ==
- List of wildlife management areas in Manitoba
- List of protected areas of Manitoba
