= Brokenhead River Ecological Reserve =

Protected area in Manitoba, Canada

Coordinates: 50.183°N 96.446°W

- IUCN category Ia (strict nature reserve)
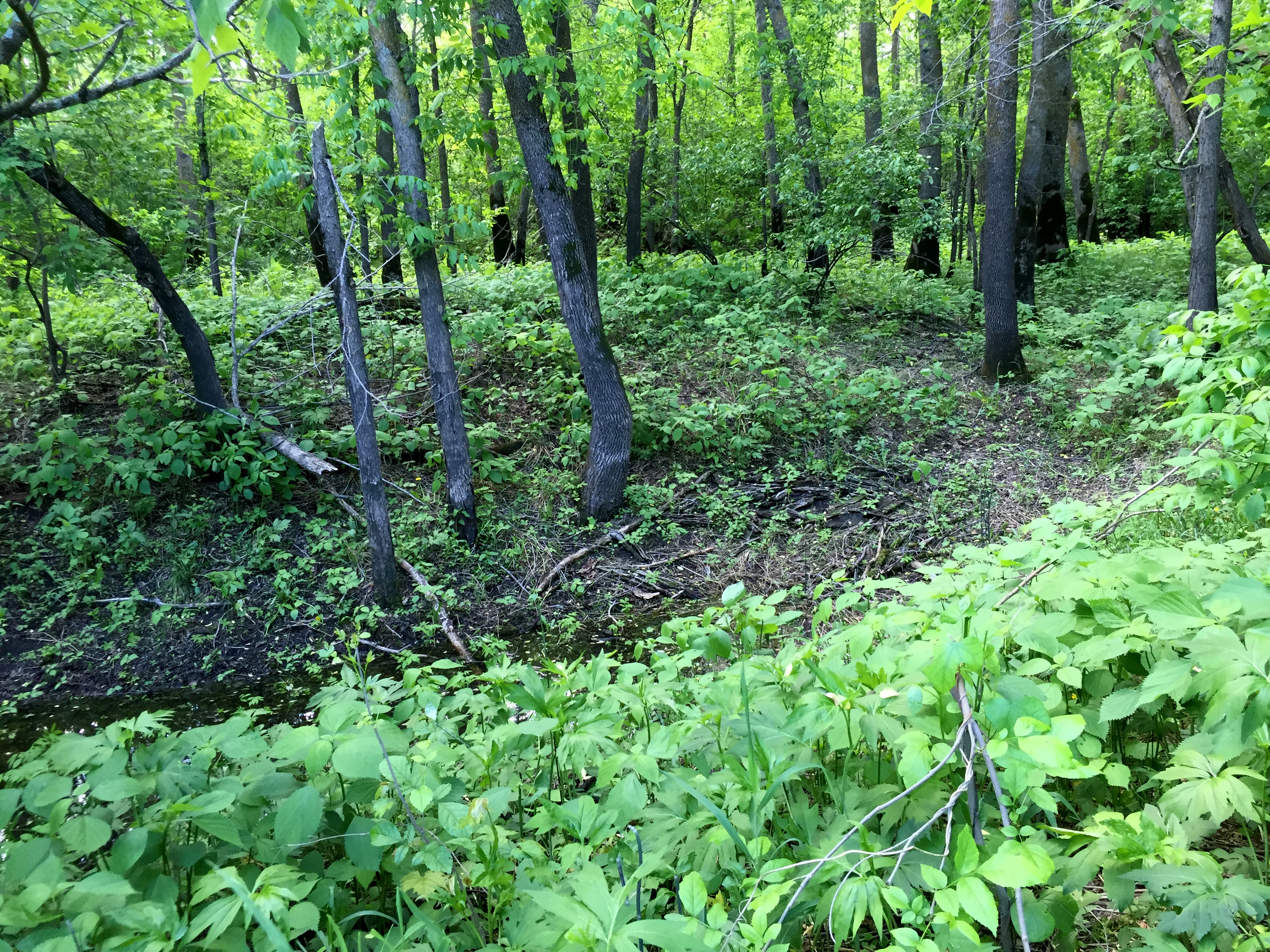
- River-bottom forest in the Brokenhead Ecological Reserve, 5 June 2016
- Interactive map of Brokenhead River Ecological Reserve
- Area: 64 ha (160 acres)
- Established: 1978

Brokenhead River Ecological Reserve is an ecological reserve on the Brokenhead River, Manitoba, Canada. It was established in 1978 under the Manitoba Crown Lands Act. It is 0.64 square kilometres (0.25 sq mi) in size. It is a reserve that protects 66 hectares of forest. The forest is home to a variety of trees such as the oak, spruce, and elm. The forest is home to animals as well, which include, the red fox, snapping turtle, beaver, and mink.

== See also ==
- List of ecological reserves in Manitoba
- List of protected areas of Manitoba
