= Lewis Bog Ecological Reserve =

Protected area in Manitoba, Canada

Coordinates: 49.811°N 96.062°W

- IUCN category Ia (strict nature reserve)
- Interactive map of Lewis Bog Ecological Reserve
- Area: 5,370 ha (20.7 sq mi)
- Established: 1987

Lewis Bog Ecological Reserve is an ecological reserve located in the Agassiz Provincial Forest, Manitoba, Canada. It was established in 1987 under the Manitoba Ecological Reserves Act. It is 53.7 square kilometres (20.7 sq mi) in size.

== See also ==
- List of ecological reserves in Manitoba
- List of protected areas of Manitoba
