= Kaskatamagan Sipi Wildlife Management Area =

Protected area in Canada

- IUCN category Ib (wilderness area)
- Coordinates: 56°23′49.01248″N 91°52′3.18518″W
- Area: 133,820 ha (516.7 sq mi)
- Established: 2009

Kaskatamagan Sipi Wildlife Management Area is a protected wildlife management area located northeast of Shamattawa First Nation, Manitoba, Canada. The WMA is considered to be a Class Ib protected area under the IUCN protected area management categories. It is 133,820 hectares (516.7 sq mi) in size.

== History ==
Kaskatamagan Sipi Wildlife Management Area was established in 2009 under the Manitoba Wildlife Act. The designation was part of the Manitoba Protected Areas Initiative.

== Geography ==
Kaskatamagan Sipi Wildlife Management Area lies northeast of the remote community of Shamattawa, within the traditional territory of Shamattawa First Nation. There are no roads or facilities for visitors.

Drainage flows generally to the north east. The Machichi River flows through the WMA towards its mouth in Hudson Bay. The WMA includes the headwaters of several of its left tributaries.

== Ecology ==
Kaskatamagan Sipi Wildlife Management Area is within the Hudson Bay Lowland Ecoregion in the Hudson Plains Ecozone.

The WMA provides winter range for caribou who summer near the coast of Hudson Bay. The WMA is at the northern extent of the northern leopard frog in Manitoba.

Bird species found in the WMA include:

- Sharp-tailed grouse
- Ruffed grouse
- Spruce grouse
- Willow ptarmigan
- Rock ptarmigan
- Sandhill crane
- Bald eagle
- Osprey
- Canada goose

Mammal species found in the WMA include:

- Moose
- Black bear
- Caribou
- Beaver
- Muskrat
- Red squirrel
- Short-tailed weasel
- Marten
- Mink
- River otter
- Wolverine
- Red fox
- Arctic fox
- Lynx
- Wolf
- Snowshoe hare

== See also ==
- List of wildlife management areas in Manitoba
- List of protected areas of Manitoba
