= Piney Ecological Reserve =

Protected area in Manitoba, Canada

Coordinates: 49.024°N 95.926°W

- IUCN category Ia (strict nature reserve)
- Area: 785 ha (1,940 acres)
- Established: 2015

Piney Ecological Reserve is an ecological reserve located 6 kilometres (3.7 mi) southeast of Piney, Manitoba, Canada. It was established in 2015 under the Manitoba Ecological Reserves Act. It is 7.85 square kilometres (3.03 sq mi) in size.

== See also ==
- List of ecological reserves in Manitoba
- List of protected areas of Manitoba
