= Whitemouth Bog Ecological Reserve =

Protected area in Manitoba, Canada

- IUCN category Ia (strict nature reserve)
- Location within Manitoba
- Location: Whitemouth Bog Wildlife Management Area, Manitoba
- Coordinates: 50.02546°N 95.91052°W
- Area: 5,020 ha (19.4 sq mi)
- Established: 2009

Whitemouth Bog Ecological Reserve is an ecological reserve located southwest of Whiteshell Provincial Park, Manitoba, Canada. It was established in 2009 under the Manitoba Ecological Reserves Act, and protects a tract of rich peatland bog in southeastern Manitoba.

Covering an area of 50.2 square kilometres (19.4 sq mi), it is the third largest ecological reserve in the province. The ecological reserve is buffered by another 30.1 km^{2} (11.6 sq mi) of protected land designated as the Whitemouth Bog Wildlife Management Area.

== See also ==
- List of ecological reserves in Manitoba
- List of protected areas of Manitoba
