= Holmgren Pines Ecological Reserve =

Protected area in Manitoba, Canada

Coordinates: 49.189°N 95.319°W

- IUCN category Ia (strict nature reserve)
- Interactive map of Holmgren Pines Ecological Reserve
- Area: 73 ha (180 acres)
- Established: 2013

Holmgren Pines Ecological Reserve is an ecological reserve located south of Moose Lake Provincial Park, Manitoba, Canada. It was established in 2013 under the Manitoba Ecological Reserves Act. It is 0.73 square kilometres (0.28 sq mi) in size.

== See also ==
- List of ecological reserves in Manitoba
- List of protected areas of Manitoba
