= Pocock Lake Ecological Reserve =

Protected area in Manitoba, Canada

Coordinates: 49.429°N 96.289°W

- IUCN category Ia (strict nature reserve)
- Area: 205 ha (510 acres)
- Established: 1997

Pocock Lake Ecological Reserve is an ecological reserve located within the Sandilands Provincial Forest, Manitoba, Canada. It was established in 1997 under the Manitoba Ecological Reserves Act. It is 2.05 square kilometres (0.79 sq mi) in size.

== See also ==
- List of ecological reserves in Manitoba
- List of protected areas of Manitoba
