= Woodridge Ecological Reserve =

Protected area in Manitoba, Canada

Coordinates: 49.275°N 96.283°W

- IUCN category Ia (strict nature reserve)
- Area: 120 ha (300 acres)
- Established: 2015

Woodridge Ecological Reserve is an ecological reserve located 9 kilometres (5.6 mi) west of Woodridge in the Rural Municipality of Piney, Manitoba, Canada. It is 1.2 square kilometres (0.46 sq mi) in size.

== See also ==
- List of ecological reserves in Manitoba
- List of protected areas of Manitoba
