= Red Rock Ecological Reserve =

Protected area in Manitoba, Canada

Coordinates: 53.628°N 100.640°W

- IUCN category Ia (strict nature reserve)
- Area: 502 ha (1,240 acres)
- Established: 1997

Red Rock Ecological Reserve is an ecological reserve located adjacent to the Tom Lamb Wildlife Management Area, Manitoba, Canada. It was established in 1979 under the Manitoba Crown Lands Act. It is 5.02 square kilometres (1.94 sq mi) in size.

== See also ==
- List of ecological reserves in Manitoba
- List of protected areas of Manitoba
