= Assiniboine Corridor Wildlife Management Area =

Wildlife management area in Manitoba, Canada

- IUCN category IV (habitat/species management area)
- Interactive map of Assiniboine Corridor Wildlife Management Area
- Coordinates: 49°37′8″N 99°19′12″W
- Area: 3,374 ha (13.03 sq mi)
- Established: 2000

Assiniboine Corridor Wildlife Management Area is a wildlife management area located along the Assiniboine River, Manitoba, Canada. It was established in 2000 under the Manitoba Wildlife Act. It is 33.74 square kilometres (13.03 sq mi) in size.

== See also ==
- List of wildlife management areas in Manitoba
- List of protected areas of Manitoba
