= Lake St. George Caves Ecological Reserve =

Protected area in Manitoba, Canada

- IUCN category Ia (strict nature reserve)
- Area: 49 ha (120 acres)
- Established: 1997

Lake St. George Caves Ecological Reserve is an ecological reserve located west of Lake Winnipeg, Manitoba, Canada. It was established in 1997 under the Manitoba Ecological Reserves Act. It is .49 square kilometres (0.19 sq mi) in size.

== See also ==
- List of ecological reserves in Manitoba
- List of protected areas of Manitoba
