= Libau Bog Ecological Reserve =

Protected area in Manitoba, Canada

Coordinates: 50.259°N 96.615°W

- IUCN category Ia (strict nature reserve)
- Interactive map of Libau Bog Ecological Reserve
- Area: 180 ha (440 acres)
- Established: 1989

Libau Bog Ecological Reserve is an ecological reserve located in the Mars Hill Wildlife Management Area, Manitoba, Canada. It was established in 1989 under the Manitoba Ecological Reserves Act. It is 1.8 square kilometres (0.69 sq mi) in size.

== Flora ==
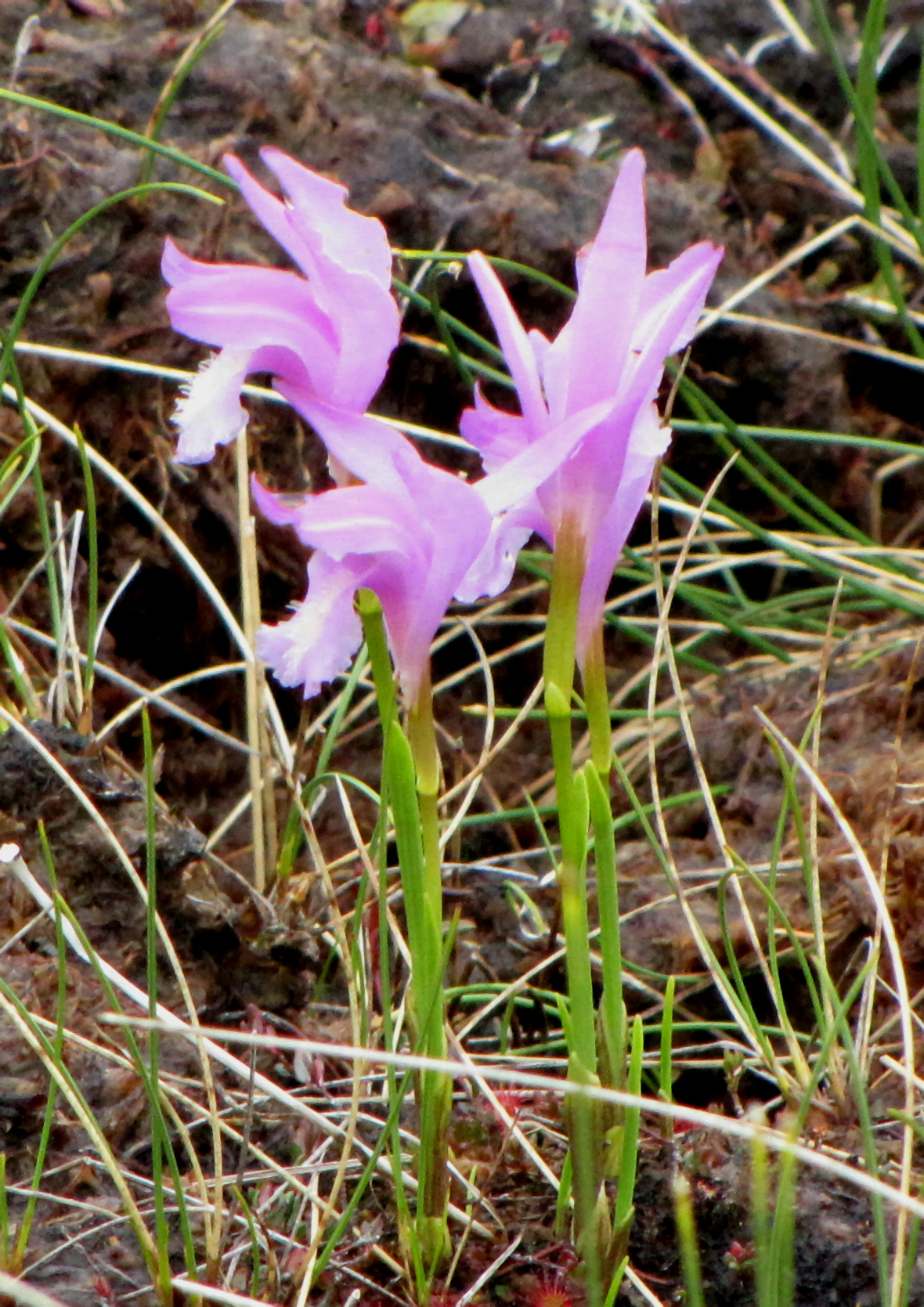
Arethusa bulbosa (dragon's mouth orchid)

According to the Government of Manitoba's informational PDF about the site,

The Libau Bog Ecological Reserve consists of black spruce-tamarack bog and floating sedge bog. This floating sedge bog is classified as a quaking bog; formed when a mat of vegetation grows over a shallow pond. At least 11 species of orchid, including the rare dragon’s mouth orchid, grass-pink, ram’s head lady’s-slipper and adder’s mouth orchid can be found here. Other shrubby species found on the site include: red osier dogwood, Labrador tea, shrubby cinquefoil, round leaved orchid and round-leafed bog orchid.

== See also ==
- List of ecological reserves in Manitoba
- List of protected areas of Manitoba
