= Little George Island Ecological Reserve =

Protected area in Manitoba, Canada

Coordinates: 52.862°N 97.786°W

- IUCN category Ia (strict nature reserve)
- Interactive map of Little George Island Ecological Reserve
- Area: 15 ha (37 acres)
- Established: 2004

Little George Island Ecological Reserve is an ecological reserve located on an island in the Lake Winnipeg, Manitoba, Canada. It was established in 2004 under the Manitoba Ecological Reserves Act. It is .15 square kilometres (0.058 sq mi) in size.

== See also ==
- List of ecological reserves in Manitoba
- List of protected areas of Manitoba
