= Wellington Wildlife Management Area (Manitoba) =

Wildlife management area in Manitoba, Canada

- IUCN category III (natural monument or feature)
- Interactive map of Wellington Wildlife Management Area
- Coordinates: 49°0′36″N 98°15′2″W
- Area: 65 ha (160 acres)
- Established: 2006

Wellington Wildlife Management Area is a wildlife management area located 30 kilometres (19 mi) southwest of Winkler, Manitoba, Canada. It was established in 2006 under the Manitoba Wildlife Act. It is 0.65 square kilometres (0.25 sq mi) in size.

== See also ==
- List of wildlife management areas in Manitoba
- List of protected areas of Manitoba
