= St. Labre Bog Ecological Reserve =

Protected area in Manitoba, Canada

Coordinates: 49.4927°N 96.0057°W

Ste. Labre Bog Ecological Reserve
- IUCN category Ia (strict nature reserve)
- Interactive map of Ste. Labre Bog Ecological Reserve
- Area: 4,030 ha (15.6 sq mi)
- Established: 2015

Ste. Labre Bog Ecological Reserve is an ecological reserve located 40 kilometres (25 mi) east of Steinbach, Manitoba, Canada. It was established in 2015 under the Manitoba Ecological Reserves Act. It is 40.3 square kilometres (15.6 sq mi) in size.

== See also ==
- List of ecological reserves in Manitoba
- List of protected areas of Manitoba
