= Birch River Ecological Reserve =

Protected area in Manitoba, Canada

Coordinates: 52.425°N 101.121°W

- IUCN category Ia (strict nature reserve)
- Interactive map of Birch River Ecological Reserve
- Area: 183 ha (450 acres)
- Established: 2005

Birch River Ecological Reserve is an ecological reserve in the Porcupine Provincial Forest, Manitoba, Canada. It was established in 2005 under the Manitoba Ecological Reserves Act. It is 1.83 square kilometres (0.71 sq mi) in size.

== See also ==
- List of ecological reserves in Manitoba
- List of protected areas of Manitoba
