= Kaweenakumik Islands Ecological Reserve =

Protected area in Manitoba, Canada

- IUCN category Ia (strict nature reserve)
- Area: 63 ha (160 acres)
- Established: 1989

Kaweenakumik Islands Ecological Reserve is an ecological reserve located on several islands in Lake Kaweenakumik, Manitoba, Canada. It was established in 1989 under the Manitoba Ecological Reserves Act. It is .63 square kilometres (0.24 sq mi) in size.

== See also ==
- List of ecological reserves in Manitoba
- List of protected areas of Manitoba
