= Jennifer and Tom Shay Ecological Reserve =

Protected area in Manitoba, Canada

Coordinates: 49.645°N 97.113°W

- IUCN category Ia (strict nature reserve)
- Area: 7 ha (17 acres)
- Established: 2004

Jennifer and Tom Shay Ecological Reserve is an ecological reserve located on the east bank of the Red River, near the town of St. Adolphe, Manitoba, Canada. It was established in 2004 under the Manitoba Ecological Reserves Act. It is 0.07 square kilometres (0.027 sq mi) in size.

== See also ==
- List of ecological reserves in Manitoba
- List of protected areas of Manitoba
