= Whitemouth Bog Wildlife Management Area =

Wildlife management area in Manitoba, Canada

Coordinates: 50.0241°N 95.9125°W

- IUCN category II (national park)
- Interactive map of Whitemouth Bog Wildlife Management Area
- Area: 3,010 ha (11.6 sq mi)
- Established: 2009

Whitemouth Bog Wildlife Management Area is a wildlife management area that spans either side of the Whitemouth Bog Ecological Reserve in Manitoba, Canada. It was established in 2009 under the Manitoba Wildlife Act and covers an area of 30.1 square kilometres (11.6 sq mi) in size.

== See also ==
- List of wildlife management areas in Manitoba
- List of protected areas of Manitoba
