= List of wildlife management areas in Manitoba =

This is a list of wildlife management areas in the Canadian province of Manitoba. Wildlife management areas are designated by the Government of Manitoba under The Wildlife Act. For a list of all protected areas in Manitoba, see the List of protected areas of Manitoba.

Name	Area
Alonsa Wildlife Management Area	10,910 ha (27,000 acres)
Assiniboine Corridor Wildlife Management Area	3,275 ha (8,090 acres)
Basket Lake Wildlife Management Area	7,260 ha (17,900 acres)
Bernice Wildlife Management Area	65 ha (160 acres)
Brandon Hills Wildlife Management Area	722 ha (1,780 acres)
Broad Valley Wildlife Management Area	
Broomhill Wildlife Management Area	330 ha (820 acres)
C. Stuart Stevenson Wildlife Management Area	128 ha (320 acres)
Catfish Creek Wildlife Management Area	6,434 ha (15,900 acres)
Cayer Wildlife Management Area	1,533 ha (3,790 acres)
Churchill Wildlife Management Area	744,400 ha (1,839,000 acres)
Delta Marsh Wildlife Management Area	
Deerwood Wildlife Management Area	
Dog Lake Wildlife Management Area	
Ebor Wildlife Management Area	64 ha (160 acres)
Gerald W. Malaher Wildlife Management Area	61 ha (150 acres)
Grant's Lake Wildlife Management Area	400 ha (990 acres)
Gypsumville Wildlife Management Area	2,461 ha (6,080 acres)
Harrison Wildlife Management Area	65 ha (160 acres)
Hilbre Wildlife Management Area	
Holmfield Wildlife Management Area	64 ha (160 acres)
Kaskatamagan Sipi Wildlife Management Area	133,820 ha (330,700 acres)
Kaskatamagan Wildlife Management Area	300,926 ha (743,600 acres)
Lake Francis Wildlife Management Area	
Langruth Wildlife Management Area	1,813 ha (4,480 acres)
Lauder Sandhills Wildlife Management Area	1,813 ha (4,480 acres)
Lee Lake Wildlife Management Area	7,127 ha (17,610 acres)
Lee River Wildlife Management Area	1,187 ha (2,930 acres)
Little Birch Wildlife Management Area	
Little Saskatchewan Wildlife Management Area	323 ha (800 acres)
Mantagao Lake Wildlife Management Area	51,368 ha (126,930 acres)
Maple Lake Wildlife Management Area	65 ha (160 acres)
Mars Hill Wildlife Management Area	3,383 ha (8,360 acres)
Marshy Point Wildlife Management Area	
Moose Creek Wildlife Management Area	70,548 ha (174,330 acres)
Narcisse Wildlife Management Area	
Oak Hammock Marsh Wildlife Management Area	3,580 ha (8,800 acres)
Observation Point Wildlife Management Area	6,529 ha (16,130 acres)
Onanole Wildlife Management Area	574 ha (1,420 acres)
Otter Lake Wildlife Management Area	67 ha (170 acres)
Parkland Wildlife Management Area	910 ha (2,200 acres)
Pembina Valley Wildlife Management Area	3,263 ha (8,060 acres)
Peonan Point Wildlife Management Area	
Pierson Wildlife Management Area	264 ha (650 acres)
Point River Wildlife Management Area	3,445 ha (8,510 acres)
Portage Sandhills	
Proven Lake Wildlife Management Area	2,003 ha (4,950 acres)
Proulx Lake Wildlife Management Area	3,124 ha (7,720 acres)
Rat River Wildlife Management Area	1,056 ha (2,610 acres)
Red Deer Wildlife Management Area	113,700 ha (281,000 acres)
Riverside Wildlife Management Area	96 ha (240 acres)
Saskeram Wildlife Management Area	95,453 ha (235,870 acres)
Sleeve Lake Wildlife Management Area	
Souris River Bend Wildlife Management Area	2,196 ha (5,430 acres)
Spruce Woods Wildlife Management Area	291 ha (720 acres)
Spur Woods Wildlife Management Area	725 ha (1,790 acres)
St. Malo Wildlife Management Area	
Steeprock Wildlife Management Area	1,905 ha (4,710 acres)
Stuartburn Wildlife Management Area	325 ha (800 acres)
John T. Williams Wildlife Management Area	725 ha (1,790 acres)
Tiger Hills Wildlife Management Area	558 ha (1,380 acres)
Tom Lamb Wildlife Management Area	216,418 ha (534,780 acres)
Turtle Mountain Wildlife Management Area	257 ha (640 acres)
Upper Assiniboine Wildlife Management Area	2,095 ha (5,180 acres)
Wakopa Wildlife Management Area	66 ha (160 acres)
Washow Bay Wildlife Management Area	1,425 ha (3,520 acres)
Watson P. Davidson Wildlife Management Area	5,933 ha (14,660 acres)
Weiden Wildlife Management Area	850 ha (2,100 acres)
Wellington Wildlife Management Area	
Westlake Wildlife Management Area	5,911 ha (14,610 acres)
Whitemouth Bog Wildlife Management Area	3,006 ha (7,430 acres)
Whitemud Watershed Wildlife Management Area	5,682 ha (14,040 acres)
Whitewater Lake Wildlife Management Area	8,257 ha (20,400 acres)
