= Cowan Bog Ecological Reserve =

Protected area in Manitoba, Canada

Coordinates: 52.071°N 100.716°W

- IUCN category Ia (strict nature reserve)
- Interactive map of Cowan Bog Ecological Reserve
- Area: 518 ha (1,280 acres)
- Established: 1983

Cowan Bog Ecological Reserve is an ecological reserve located northeast of the Duck Mountain Provincial Forest, Manitoba, Canada. It was established in 1983 under the Manitoba Ecological Reserves Act. It is 5.18 square kilometres (2.00 sq mi) in size.

== See also ==
- List of ecological reserves in Manitoba
- List of protected areas of Manitoba
