= Pelican Islands Ecological Reserve =

Protected area in Manitoba, Canada

- IUCN category Ia (strict nature reserve)
- Area: 130 ha (320 acres)
- Established: 2001

Pelican Islands Ecological Reserve is an ecological reserve located on several islands in Lake Winnipeg, Manitoba, Canada. It was established in 2001 under the Manitoba Ecological Reserves Act. It is 1.3 square kilometres (0.50 sq mi) in size.

== See also ==
- List of ecological reserves in Manitoba
- List of protected areas of Manitoba
