= Alonsa Wildlife Management Area =

Protected area in Manitoba, Canada

- IUCN category IV (habitat/species management area)
- Interactive map of Alonsa Wildlife Management Area
- Coordinates: 50°57′N 99°14′W
- Area: 3,866 ha (14.93 sq mi)
- Established: 1999

Alonsa Wildlife Management Area

Alonsa Wildlife Management Area is a wildlife management area located northwest of Alonsa, Manitoba, Canada. It was established in 1999 under the Manitoba Wildlife Act. It is 38.66 square kilometres (14.93 sq mi) in size.

== See also ==
- List of wildlife management areas in Manitoba
- List of protected areas of Manitoba
