= Wakopa Wildlife Management Area =

Wildlife management area located near Turtle Mountain Provincial Park

- IUCN category IV (habitat/species management area)
- Interactive map of Wakopa Wildlife Management Area
- Coordinates: 49°2′21″N 99°52′42″W
- Area: 64 ha (160 acres)
- Established: 2006

Wakopa Wildlife Management Area is a wildlife management area located near Turtle Mountain Provincial Park, Manitoba, Canada. It was established in 2006 under the Manitoba Wildlife Act. It is 0.64 square kilometres (0.25 sq mi) in size.

== See also ==
- List of wildlife management areas in Manitoba
- List of protected areas of Manitoba
