= Baralzon Lake Ecological Reserve =

Protected area in Manitoba, Canada

- IUCN category Ib (wilderness area)
- Coordinates: 59°54′N 97°59′W
- Area: 39,600 ha (153 sq mi)
- Established: 1989

Baralzon Lake Ecological Reserve is an ecological reserve in the area surrounding the portion of Baralzon Lake within Manitoba, Canada. It was established in 1989 under the Manitoba Ecological Reserves Act. It is 396 square kilometres (153 sq mi) in size.

== See also ==
- List of ecological reserves in Manitoba
- List of protected areas of Manitoba
