= Peter Nygård =

Canadian-Finnish fashion executive (born 1941)

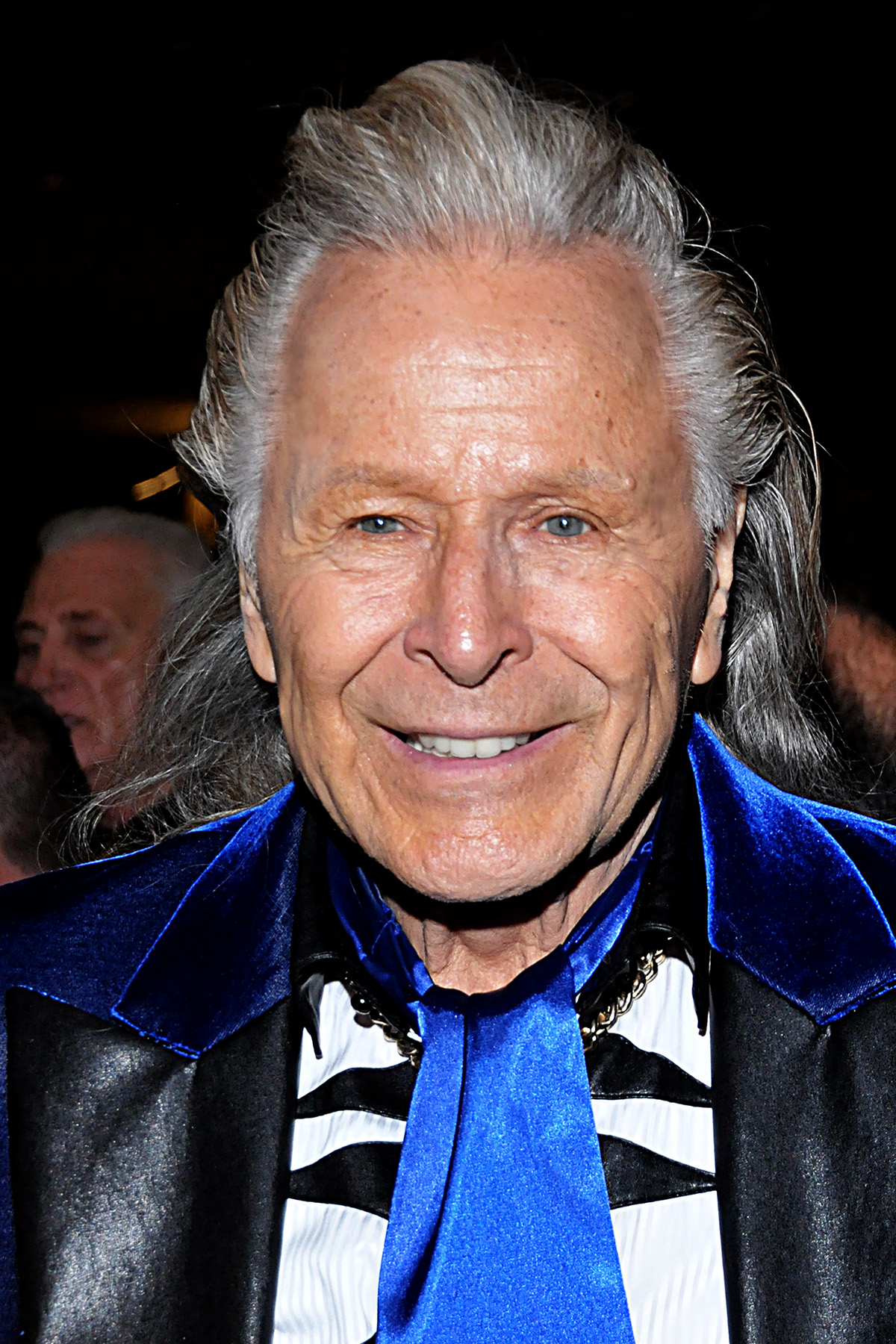
- Nygård in 2016
- Born: Pekka Juhani Nygård; 24 July 1941 (age 85); Helsinki, Finland
- Citizenship: Finnish; Canadian
- Education: University of North Dakota
- Occupations: Businessman; Clothing manufacturer
- Years active: 1967–2021
- Known for: Founding Nygård International
- Children: 10

Peter J. Nygård (Note: Finnish pronunciation: [ˈnyːˌɡoːrd].) (born Pekka Juhani Nygård; born 24 July 1941) is a Finnish-Canadian businessman, former fashion executive, and convicted sex offender. In 1967, he founded Nygård International, a Winnipeg-based company that initially was a sportswear manufacturer before producing women's apparel.

Nygård was rated the 70th richest Canadian by Canadian Business magazine in 2009, with a net worth of CA$817 million, while in 2017 his net worth was estimated to be CA$900 million.

In 2020, the Federal Bureau of Investigation (FBI) carried out a search warrant of Nygård's offices in New York City after he was accused of sex trafficking, sexual assault and racketeering. Nygård stepped down as chairman of Nygård International soon after. The company filed for bankruptcy later in 2020. In December 2020, Nygård was formally charged on sex trafficking and racketeering charges, including allegations of sex trafficking involving minors. In October 2021, he was again charged in Canada with multiple counts of sexual assault and forcible confinement in incidents that occurred between the mid-1980s and mid-2000s; accusations of sexual misconduct by Nygård date as far back as 1968. In November 2023, a Canadian court convicted Nygård of four counts of sexual assault. In September 2024, he was sentenced to 11 years in prison for 4 counts of sexual assault.

== Early life ==
Peter Nygård was born Pekka Juhani Nygård in Helsinki, Finland on 24 July 1941. His parents immigrated to Deloraine, Manitoba in Canada, in 1952, when he was around 11 years old. His father was a baker, and his mother a seamstress. In 1964, he graduated from the University of North Dakota in Grand Forks with a business degree.

== Nygård International ==
Peter Nygård established Nygård Apparel Manufacturing Company, later rebranded Nygård International, in Winnipeg in 1967. In 1978, his takeover of a sportswear designer's business in New York City led to a 12-year legal battle in New York federal court. The company produced clothing under brand names including Nygård Fashions, Nygård Slims, Bianca Nygård, ADX, TanJay, Alia, and Allison Daley. The company's Canadian headquarters was located on King Street in Toronto while its world headquarters was located in Times Square, Manhattan. Times Square was also the location of Nygård's fashion concept retail store, which opened on Friday, 6 November 2009. Nygård's personal net-worth was estimated at $900 million in 2020.

In February 2020, the headquarters of Nygård International was raided as part of a sex trafficking investigation against Nygård by the Federal Bureau of Investigation (FBI). Afterwards, Nygård announced that he would step down from the company and divest his ownership interest. In March 2020, a judge said that there was no evidence Nygård had actually resigned, and that he still owned 100% of the shares of the Nygård group of companies. The company filed for Chapter 15 bankruptcy in New York on 18 March 2020, and a Manitoba judge ordered a group of Nygård companies into receivership the following day. On 30 April, a Canadian judge authorized an accounting firm to sell off part of the business.

== Sexual abuse ==
Over the years Nygård has been accused numerous times of abuse including forcible confinement, sex trafficking, sexual assault and sexual harassment. In 1968, Winnipeg police charged Nygård with a sexual offense, charges that were later dropped after his alleged victim declined to testify. In 1980, the Winnipeg Free Press wrote that Winnipeg police charged Nygård with the sexual assault of an 18-year-old woman. Later those charges were stayed because she declined to testify. In the 1990s, Nygård settled sexual harassment complaints by three former employees in Manitoba.

Playboy actress Suelyn Medeiros has been alleged to have acted as Nygård's "top girlfriend" and "recruiter" and "received significant cash, salary, jewelry, plastic surgery, cars and stem cell injections in exchange for trafficking victims".

=== Investigations and lawsuits ===
In 2015 and 2017, Nygård was investigated by the FBI over claims of sex trafficking. He was also investigated by the United States Department of Homeland Security for 9 months in 2016. On 24 November 2019, Bahamian police began investigating six allegations of sexual assault made against Nygård. All the alleged victims were under 16 at the time of the alleged assaults. Additionally, on 27 January 2020, Nygård faced two separate lawsuits after being accused of sexual assault.

On 13 February 2020, 10 women filed a class-action lawsuit against Nygård in New York, alleging sexual assault as part of a sex-trafficking network including against seven minors, between 2008 and 2015. On 14 February 2020, it was reported that the Bahamian police were investigating the allegations made by four of the women in the class-action suit. On 25 February 2020, the New York headquarters of Nygård International were raided by the FBI and the New York City Police Department in connection with sex trafficking claims.

On 20 April 2020, 36 new women joined the class-action suit, bringing the total number of plaintiffs in the sexual assault case to 46. On 17 June 2020, it was reported that 11 more women had joined the class-action lawsuit, bringing the total number of plaintiffs to 57. On 9 July 2020, Nygård filed a motion to dismiss the claims of 52 of the plaintiffs, saying that "numerous deficiencies" barred their claims, and in particular that the claims of 50 of the plaintiffs lacked any connection to New York. He also argued that the statute of limitations had expired for 38 of the plaintiffs. On 17 August 2020, Nygård was sued by two of his sons on accusations that Nygård directed a known sex worker, said to be "his girlfriend," to sexually assault them. On 22 August 2020, it was reported that the class-action suit had been placed on hold due to the U.S. government having requested a stay of proceedings while the criminal investigation was ongoing.

=== Arrest and conviction ===
On 15 December 2020, Nygård was arrested in Winnipeg for extradition to the US to face charges of sex trafficking by the US attorney's office in Manhattan, New York. On 5 February 2021, he was denied bail due to being a flight risk and the risk of him tampering with evidence. At the time Nygård faced extradition to the U.S. On 18 February 2021, it was reported that a lawsuit had been filed by one of the class-action plaintiffs, which named Peter Nygård's niece, Angela Dyborn, as an alleged co-conspirator in the alleged sex-trafficking scheme. On 26 March 2021, Nygård was denied bail for a second time. In April 2021 it was reported that Nygård would face an extradition hearing in November 2021.

On 1 October 2021, Nygård agreed to be extradited to the U.S., to face charges against him that were filed there. The same day Nygård was charged by Toronto police with six counts of sexual assault and three counts of forcible confinement. On 2 December 2021, it was reported that Nygård would not face charges by Winnipeg police following a ten-month investigation into allegations of sexual assault from eight women against him.

In November 2023, Nygård was found guilty of sexual assault by a Canadian jury in Toronto, after a six-week trial. The 82-year-old Nygård was convicted for assaults on four women, ranging in age from 16 to 28 at the time of the offenses, occurring between the late 1980s and 2005. The assaults reportedly took place in a secure luxury bedroom in his company's headquarters. Nygård denied the charges, with his defense team suggesting the victims were seeking financial gain. Nygård is also facing further legal charges, including a trial in Montreal, charges in Winnipeg, and potential extradition to the U.S. for related crimes. The preliminary inquiry for the charges against Nygård in Montreal is scheduled for 28 January 2025.

Nygård's son Kai Zen Bickle commended the conviction saying that his father "used his business talents for evil, to prey on others," and "it's a very good thing that justice was served here." In September 2024, a court in Toronto sentenced Nygård to 11 years in prison for 4 counts of sexual assault.

== Lawsuits ==
Nygård has been involved in numerous lawsuits before his arrest in 2020, including suits involving alleged abusive labour practices, tax evasion.

- In the 1990s, Nygård settled sexual harassment complaints by three former employees in Manitoba.
- In 1999, Nygård sued Linda Lampenius for defamation concerning her comments about Nygård's parties with naked women. The case continued until 2001 when Lampenius states she ran out of funds and had to settle, which consisted of publishing an apology in the newspaper Ilta-Sanomat.
- In 2005, Finnish newspaper Iltalehti published an article about sex parties at Nygård's mansion, even featuring a short interview with Jessica Alba where she felt she had to leave a party at the Nygård Cay mansion (she was there filming Into the Blue) after witnessing events at the party. Nygård sued the parent company of the paper Alma Media for slander in Los Angeles. He lost the case.
- In 2006, Canadian tax authorities claimed Nygård underreported $15 million in taxes. He argued that he severed residential ties with Canada in 1975; he was ultimately subject to taxes on an unreported $2 million.
- In 2008, Nygård was sued in Los Angeles County Superior Court by a former girlfriend for slamming a door on her hand. He quickly settled the lawsuit.
- In 2012, Nygård launched a lawsuit against the CBC regarding copyright issues about private videos taken at his residence, which were then used in an April 2010 documentary. He had also launched a copyright complaint with the U.S. District Court in New York and a lawsuit in Manitoba to prevent the piece from airing. He had previously sued two former employees for releasing confidential information and his lawyer claimed the CBC harassed many of the employees. Nygård launched a civil suit against his neighbour and the Lyford Cay Property Owners Association alleging they conspired with the CBC to damage his reputation; he also filed a private criminal prosecution against three CBC journalists accusing them of conspiring to discredit him and his clothing empire.
- On 15 November 2019, a judge in the Bahamas sentenced Nygård to 90 days in prison and fined him $150,000 after finding he breached a court order prohibiting the disclosure of emails that were stolen from a non-profit group. He subsequently paid the fine, appealed the contempt order, and obtained a stay of execution of the prison sentence until his appeal was heard. On 1 February 2021, his appeal of the contempt order was dismissed by the Court of Appeal of the Bahamas. On 4 February 2021, Nygård filed a motion requesting leave to appeal to the Privy Council, but the Court of Appeal of the Bahamas refused to grant it. The judge who delivered the refusal said that Nygård could still apply directly to the Privy Council for leave to appeal.

== Feud with Louis Bacon ==
In 2005, Nygård installed a large concrete slab on Louis Bacon's property to facilitate parking overflow, leading to a court suit and Bacon's retaliation installing large speakers pointed at Nygard Cay. The dispute escalated to 16 legal actions between Nygård, Bacon and associates.

Bahamian police seized the speakers in summer 2010, allegedly due to complaints by Nygård. Vanity Fair reported that Nygård also used fake news sites to smear Bacon. In January 2015, Bacon filed a defamation lawsuit against Nygård over these claims. In 2019, Nygård sued two New York Times reporters for perceived bias in covering the billionaires' dispute. A New York judge awarded Bacon $203 million in May 2023, finding “a deliberate plan by Nygård to personally and professionally destroy Bacon”.

== Assets ==
=== Nygård Cay ===
In 1984, he purchased a beach bungalow for $1.76 million. In 1987, Nygård built a 14,000-square-metre (150,000 sq ft) compound at Lyford Cay in the Bahamas. He hosted Sean Connery, Michael Jackson, Robert De Niro, and George H. W. Bush at the property, which was described as housing 300 parrots, peacocks, and cockatoos around an indoor lagoon with a 40-foot dining room table which converted to a disco dance floor, and karaoke nights with "scantily clad young women" dancing while he sang "I Did It My Way." Andrew Mountbatten-Windsor was photographed with his wife and daughters Princess Eugenie and Princess Beatrice at Nygård's home.

On 14 April 2010, Nygård announced he was planning a $50-million renovation of Nygård Cay, which would take two years to complete, repair fire damage affecting over 80% of the house, and employ 200 construction workers. A letter from the Bahamian prime minister's office rejected Nygård's construction application, citing the improper expansion of his property through intentional accretion of land over the seabed. On 28 September 2018, Nygård Cay was seized by the Supreme Court of the Bahamas as part of a legal battle surrounding Nygård's efforts to dredge the sea floor around the estate. In 2019, a warrant was issued after Nygård failed to appear in court multiple times for a sentencing hearing related to two contempt-of-court convictions in the Bahamas. In 2021 the property was in a general state of disrepair.

In 2003, Nygård was sued in Florida by an American couple who claimed he deceived them into accepting jobs as managers of his Bahamas estate. The case was settled in 2007. The buildings of that estate were reported as being demolished by the Bahamian Government in April 2023.

=== Private jet ===
Nygård previously used a Boeing 727-100 as his private jet, painted silver and blue and named N-Force. The interior contained a karaoke machine, fluorescent purple disco lighting and a stripper's pole, with nightclub-style chrome paneling, mirrored ceilings, white leather seats, and a plush day bed. Nygård stopped using his 727 in 2017 due to maintenance costs and it was scrapped in Brunswick, Georgia, US. He purchased a new plane as a replacement but never finished renovating it due to mounting legal and financial troubles.

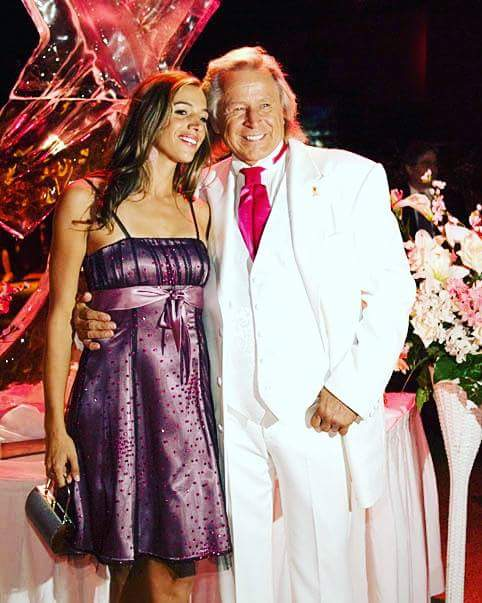
Peter Nygård with fashion model Nicole Midwin at the Breast Cancer Awareness Show, 2017

== Documentaries ==
On 17 December 2020, two days after Nygård's arrest, it was reported that Discovery+ was releasing a series about Peter Nygård's life entitled Unseamly: The Investigation of Peter Nygård. The documentary aired in February 2021, and included interviews with family members and former Nygård employees.

On 25 January 2021, CBC Podcasts released the first episode of their podcast, Evil by Design, about the allegations against Nygård. The podcast includes interviews with alleged victims. It was later adapted into a documentary series, Evil by Design: Surviving Nygård, that aired on CBC Television in 2022. An episode of Dateline about the Nygård case also aired in December 2021.

== Personal life ==
Nygård has 10 children with eight women. He has been a longtime sponsor of amateur sports in the Bahamas. In June 2010, he was the main sponsor of the Amateur Boxing Federation of the Bahamas team for Continental Elite Boxing Championships, an invitation-only event in Quito, Ecuador.

== Honours ==
In 2012, Nygård was awarded a Queen Elizabeth II Diamond Jubilee Medal.

In 2002, Deloraine, Manitoba, where Nygård grew up, unveiled a commemorative plaque and named a park in his honour. In May 2020, the park's name was changed to Prairie Sentinels Park, after Nygård was arrested and charged with sexual assault and sex trafficking.
