= Reindeer Island =

Island in Manitoba, Canada

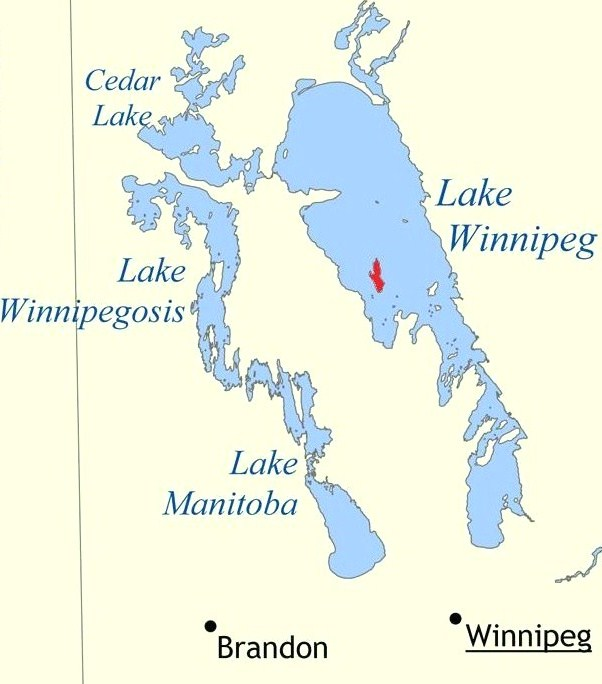
- Interactive map of Reindeer Island

Geography
- Location: Manitoba, Canada
- Coordinates: 52°24′N 97°59′W

Administration
- Canada
- Territory: Manitoba

Reindeer Island is an island located in the north basin of Lake Winnipeg, in the Canadian province of Manitoba, closer to the western shore of the lake. Uninhabited by people, it was named Manitoba's first ecological reserve in May 1976, and was created under The Crown Lands Act. Reindeer Island is located approximately 130 km (81 mi) southeast of the community of Grand Rapids.

== Geography ==
The island is approximately 27 km (17 mi) long and about 7 km (4.3 mi) wide at its widest point. It consists of 13,680 ha (33,800 acres). While Reindeer Island lacks a weather station, the entirety of southern Manitoba has a four-season humid continental climate with strong seasonal differences. Winters lack any moderation since the lake freezes over for several months, whereas onshore stations nearer the north of the lake such as Grand Rapids see seasonal lag in spring and lower diurnal temperature variation in summer than in Winnipeg and the provinces' southern landmass, likely to be even stronger on an offshore island within the lake.

== Flora and fauna ==
It was thought that the Caspian tern used the west coast of Reindeer Island as a breeding ground, as discovered by Eric Dunlop, a naturalist, who was collecting samples for the Carlisle Museum in Carlisle, England during 1914 and 1915.

== See also ==
- List of ecological reserves in Manitoba
- List of protected areas of Manitoba
