= Ducks Unlimited Canada =

Canadian conservation organization

- Type: Nonprofit organization
- Industry: Habitat Conservation
- Founded: 1938
- Headquarters: Stonewall, Manitoba
- Revenue: 150,417,831 Canadian dollar (2024)
- Total assets: 494,140,721 Canadian dollar (2024)
- Number of employees: 595 (2024)
- Website: ducks.ca

Ducks Unlimited Canada (DUC) is a Canadian non-profit environmental organization that works to conserve, create, restore and manage Canadian wetlands and associated uplands in order to provide healthy ecosystems that support North American waterfowl, other wildlife and people. They work with industry leaders, government agencies, landowners and other non-profit organizations to collaboratively protect critical habitats. DUC is a separate organization from Ducks Unlimited Inc. (DU) and Ducks Unlimited de Mexico (DUMAC). However, the three organizations share revenues, some board members and collaborate on conservation projects that benefit the wide variety of species that migrate across the continent during their annual biological cycle.

== History ==
DUC was incorporated in 1938 in Winnipeg, Manitoba, a year after DU Inc. was established in the United States. The national headquarters is located at Oak Hammock Marsh near Stonewall, Manitoba.

The organization's first conservation project was at Big Grass Marsh outside Gladstone, Manitoba. The work was privately funded by conservation minded waterfowl hunters and was in partnership with the More Game Birds in America Foundation. Big Grass Marsh had been largely drained for agricultural purposes between 1909 and 1916. However, the drainage of this wetland did not provide the productive arable land that the farmers had envisioned. The boggy land became dusty and was too silty to farm once it was drained. As such, restoration initiatives using dykes and dams by DUC succeeded in restoring the valuable habitat that had been lost. Currently, Big Grass Marsh is a 5,000-ha wetland that is an integral molting and staging area for North American waterfowl such as mallards, snow geese, and Canada geese.

Since incorporation, Ducks Unlimited Canada has expanded operations across Canada to open provincial offices in Ontario, British Columbia, Quebec, Saskatchewan and Alberta, as well as offices in the Atlantic provinces and in the Canadian territories. In 1986 DUC became a partner in the North American Waterfowl Management Plan. Since that time habitat programs have broadened in scope to focus more on conserving complexes of small productive wetlands and the upland buffer zones around them that are most vulnerable to damage and destruction. As well conservation efforts have expanded to include vulnerable habitats in the boreal forest zone, and coastal wetlands in fresh and saltwater ecosystems. There has also been a growing focus on government policy issues affecting land use and public education.

In 2019 the establishment of Ducks Unlimited Canada was designated a National Historic Event by the government of Canada. A bronze plaque commemorating this event is located at Oak Hammock Marsh in Manitoba.

== Operations ==
According to Ducks Unlimited Canada's website they operate in six regions: The Pacific Coast, Pacific Interior, Great Lakes, Atlantic, Prairie Pothole Region, and Canada's boreal forest. They note that these regions account for nearly 70% of North America's duck populations.

DUC's conservation programs are developed and delivered by a professional staff of biologists, agrologists, engineers, policy analysts, managers, and fundraisers. Habitat programs are guided by sound science through its Institute for Wetland and Waterfowl Research (IWWR).

Public education and interpretive programs for adults and students provide information and hands on experiences about the environmental, social and economic importance of conserving wetlands. Interpretive centres have been developed at the national headquarters at Oak Hammock Marsh, Manitoba (Harry J. Enns Wetland Discovery Centre), The Conservation Centre in Fredericton, New Brunswick and the Shubenacadie Wetland Centre in Nova Scotia. DUC also provides online learning resources for teachers and their students as well as support for a Youth Conservation Network, a Youth Advisory Council, a network of 27 Wetland Centres of Excellence and a Wetland Heroes initiative.

A large complement of volunteers assist in delivering fundraising, education, and public policy programs.

As of 2019, DUC had completed more than 11,023 habitat conservation projects on over 56.2 million acres of Canadian land.

The DUC annual report for 2025 stated that since its inception the organization had supported the conservation and restoration of more than 9.37 million acres and influenced more than 244 million acres. As of April 2025, Ducks Unlimited Canada was the steward of almost 6.35 million acres across 14,221 habitat projects.

DUC has long standing partnerships with the Canadian federal government to restore wetlands and grasslands in order to help mitigate the effects of habitat loss and climate change. In 2021 Environment and Climate Change Canada announced that DUC would receive $19 million in funding over three years to support prairie projects to help restore wetlands which are known to capture and store carbon.
