= Palsa Hazel Ecological Reserve =

Protected area in Manitoba, Canada

Coordinates: 54.491°N 101.357°W

- IUCN category Ia (strict nature reserve)
- Area: 1,648 ha (6.36 sq mi)
- Established: 1997

Palsa Hazel Ecological Reserve is an ecological reserve located in Grass River Provincial Park, Manitoba, Canada. It was established in 1997 under the Manitoba Ecological Reserves Act. It is 16.48 square kilometres (6.36 sq mi) in size.

== See also ==
- List of ecological reserves in Manitoba
- List of protected areas of Manitoba
