= Long Point Ecological Reserve =

Protected area in Manitoba, Canada

Coordinates: 52.976°N 98.749°W

- IUCN category Ia (strict nature reserve)
- Interactive map of Long Point Ecological Reserve
- Area: 1,837 ha (7.09 sq mi)
- Established: 1987

Long Point Ecological Reserve is an ecological reserve located on the west shore of Lake Winnipeg, Manitoba, Canada. It was established in 1987 under the Manitoba Ecological Reserves Act. It is 18.37 square kilometres (7.09 sq mi) in size.

== See also ==
- List of ecological reserves in Manitoba
- List of protected areas of Manitoba
