= Nygård International =

Canadian clothing brand

- Company type: Private
- Industry: Clothing
- Founded: 1967; 59 years ago
- Founder: Peter Nygård
- Defunct: 2020
- Fate: liquidated
- Headquarters: 1771 Inkster Blvd Winnipeg, Manitoba R2X 1R3, Canada
- Area served: Worldwide
- Products: Apparel
- Brands: ALIA; TanJay; Nygård Slims
- Number of employees: formerly 1450

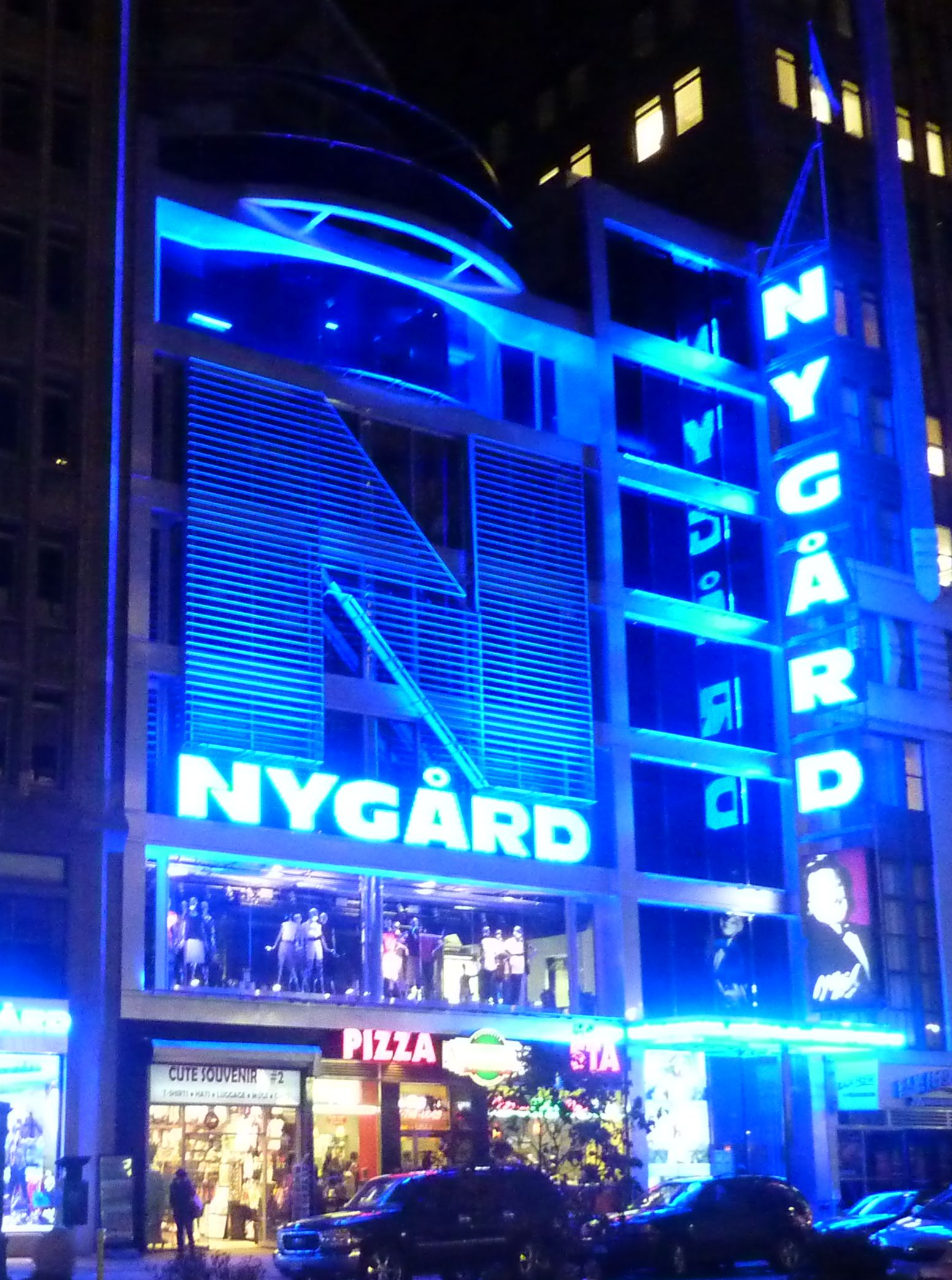
Corporate headquarters in Times Square

Nygård International was a Canadian clothing brand, based in Winnipeg, Manitoba, that was founded and named after Peter Nygård. It was the largest producer of women's apparel in Canada.

The company produced clothing under brand names such as Nygård Fashions, Nygard Slims, Bianca Nygard, ADX, TanJay, Alia, and Allison Daley.

In March 2020, a few months before Peter Nygård's arrest on charges of sex trafficking, Nygård International filed for Chapter 15 bankruptcy in New York, and its subsidiaries were ordered into receivership. The next month, a Canadian judge approved the liquidation of the company.

== History ==
In 1967, Peter Nygård founded Nygård International, simply called Nygård at the time, in Winnipeg, Manitoba, initially as a sportswear manufacturer.

In 1978, the company expanded into the United States, and in 1987 Peter Nygård opened the company's international sales and marketing team in Toronto.

On 6 November 2009, Nygård opened its flagship fashion concept store in Times Square. Guests at the opening party included Finland's UN ambassador and Ramona Singer of The Real Housewives of New York City.

On 25 February 2020, the company's New York headquarters were raided by the FBI and NYPD, in connection with sex trafficking claims against Peter Nygård. This led to Nygård stepping down from the company. In March, following Peter's arrest, Nygård International filed for Chapter 15 bankruptcy in New York City, and its brands were ordered into receivership. The subsequent month, a Canadian judge approved for the company to be sold and liquidated.

=== Liquidation and closure ===
Nygård International filed for Chapter 15 bankruptcy in New York City on 18 March 2020, and the company's brands have since been put up for sale.

In May 2020, Nygard companies owed almost $50 million to approximately 350 creditors around the world, including 40 Manitobans.

On June 30, it was reported that Dillard's would buy parts of Nygard's inventory and Allison Daley's trademark and inventory. The company was put into court-ordered receivership of Richter Advisory Group. On October 20, a judge approved the sale of Nygard's Winnipeg warehouse, which sold in late January 2021 and was the last Canadian property of Nygard International's to be liquidated.

== Operations ==
Though headquartered in Winnipeg, Manitoba, Nygård International sold its product in the United States for decades, including in many Dillard's stores. Nygård's big Canadian partners included Sears and The Bay.

The company had corporate facilities in:

1. New York, New York, United States — world headquarters, research and design
2. Winnipeg, Manitoba, Canada — IT/Retail/Services/Design & Merchandising, production & distribution
3. Toronto, Ontario, Canada — International sales & marketing team

Nygård also had a flagship fashion concept store in New York City's Times Square, which opened in 2009. The corporation also had manufacturing facilities in Shanghai, Tianjin, Sri Lanka, Indonesia, and Mexico.

Nygård International's board consisted of Peter Nygård himself and two division presidents.

=== Brands and retail outlets ===
Nygård International had multiple product lines, including ALIA and TanJay. The Nygård Fashions brands included Peter Nygård Collections, Bianca Nygård, and Nygård SLIMS. Nygård Moderate also had three national brands that were exclusively available at Dillard's in the United States.

Retail stores carrying Nygård brands included Walmart, Costco, Winners, and Belks, as well as a number of small independent stores across North America.

In February 2020, Dillard's dropped Nygård products due to allegations of Peter Nygård being involved with rape and sex trafficking.

=== Fashion and technology ===
Throughout the 2000s, Nygård International used the slogan "Where Fashion Meets Technology." The company developed an electronic purchase-order system that automated and streamlined the processing of vendor transactions. Using Microsoft .NET Framework and Internet Information Services in conjunction with Nygård's enterprise software solution from Epicor, the system linked manufacturing with a network of Nygård's retail accounts to keep them fully stocked at all times, allowing reorders to be shipped the same day. Another system input information and put out a use of pattern and material that reduced fabric-cutting time substantially. Microsoft would go on to use Nygård International as the subject of a case study highlighting the early adoption of their software.

Moreover, the company has won numerous technology-related awards, including the 2007 Most Innovative VICS CPFR Implementation, and 2009 BeyeNETWORK Vision Award for Business Impact.

=== Alleged sweatshop ===
In late April 2010, the National Labor Committee (NLC) issued a report claiming that Nygård pants from its Alia line were being sewn in a sweatshop in Al-Zarqa, Jordan, called International British Garments (IBG). According to the investigation, the factory employed 1,200 guest workers (mostly young women) from Sri Lanka, Bangladesh, and India who had "been trafficked to Jordan, stripped of their passports and held under conditions of indentured servitude." The report said that women were forced to work 15-hour shifts, 7 days a week, and were paid only half of what they were owed.

The IBG sweatshop in Jordan is owned by G4S, the largest security service company in the world.
