= Brokenhead Wetland Ecological Reserve =

Protected area in Manitoba, Canada

Coordinates: 50.388°N 96.559°W

- IUCN category Ia (strict nature reserve)
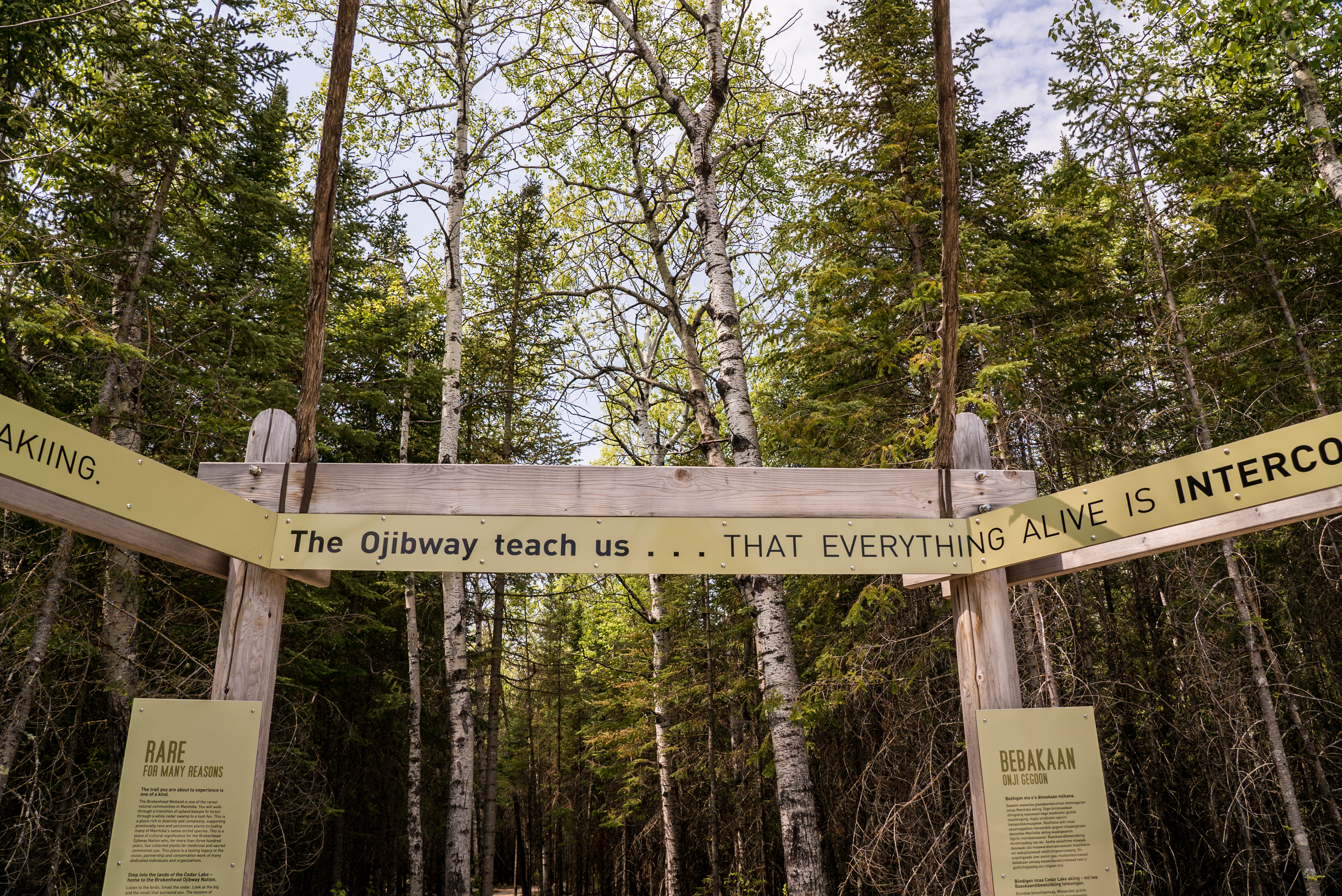
- Entrance to the Brokenhead Wetland Interpretive Trail
- Interactive map of Brokenhead Wetland Ecological Reserve
- Location: 1 km south of and 12, 59 Provincial Trunk Hwy 12, Beaconia, MB R0E 0B0
- Area: 1,240 ha (4.8 sq mi)
- Established: 2005

Brokenhead Wetland Ecological Reserve

Brokenhead Wetland Ecological Reserve is an ecological reserve northeast of Scanterbury, Manitoba, Canada. It was established in 2005 under the Manitoba Ecological Reserves Act. It is 12.4 square kilometres (4.8 sq mi) in size.

== Flora ==
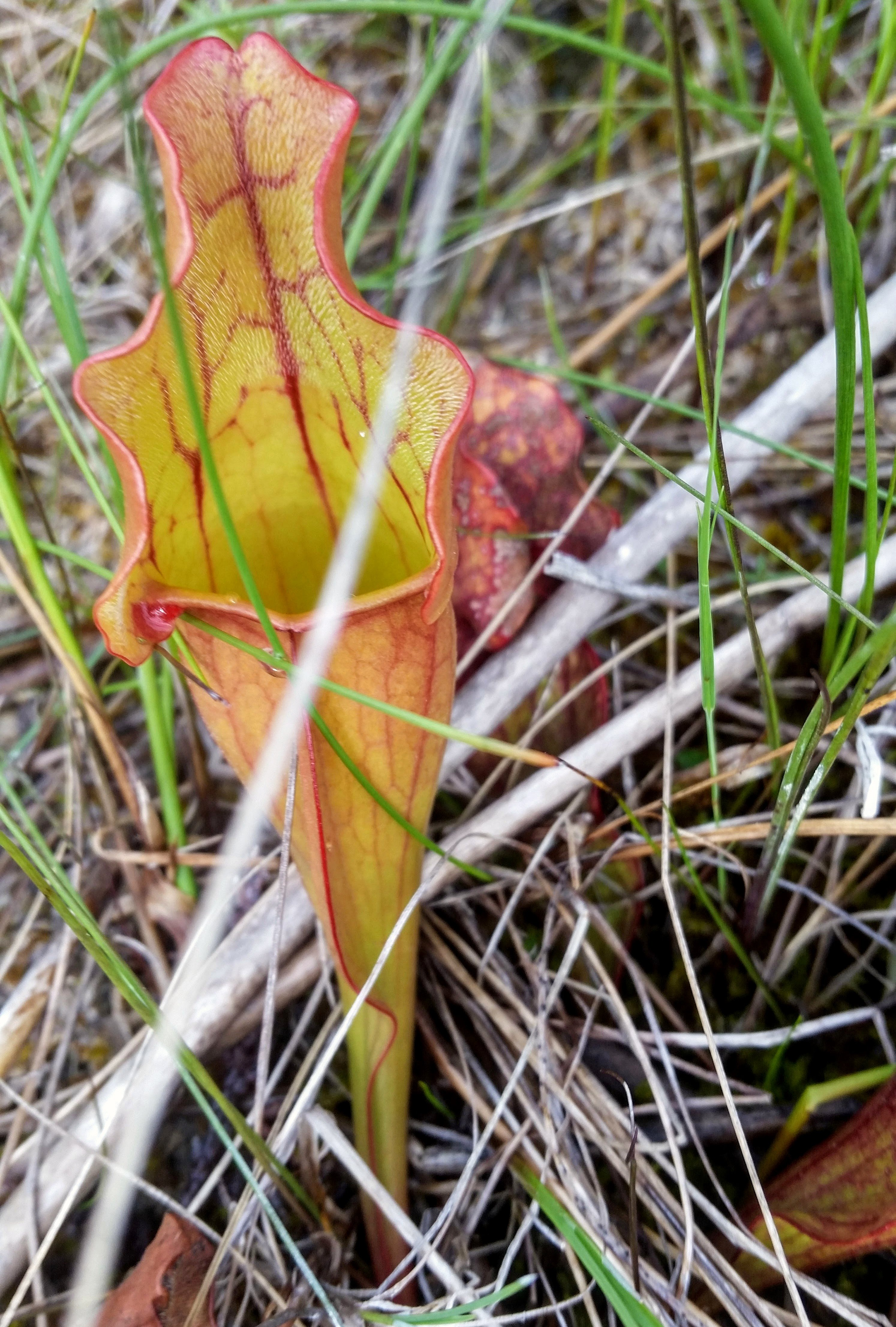
A pitcher plant along the Brokenhead Wetland Interpretive Trail in Manitoba, Canada. (35350766300)

According to the Government of Manitoba's informational PDF about the site,

The reserve contains 23 species of provincially rare and uncommon plants. Twenty-eight of Manitoba’s 36 native orchid species, including the rare ram’s head lady’s-slipper, are found in the wetland along with eight of Manitoba’s 10 species of carnivorous (insect-eating) plants. A rare white cedar community also forms part of the wetland area.

Among the carnivorous plants found in the reserve are the purple pitcher-plant, common butterwort, sundew and common bladderwort. The reserve includes a calcareous fen, a habitat that is essential to the survival of the rare plant species.

== Conservation ==
According to the Government of Manitoba's informational PDF about the site,

Manitoba Conservation and Water Stewardship has partnered with Debwendon Inc. to create an interpretive trail and boardwalk on the Crown land adjacent to the ecological reserve. This was also made possible through funding support from the Eugene Reimer Environment Fund at The Winnipeg Foundation. The installation of the boardwalks and interpretive signage allows the public to safely visit the area for aesthetic, educational and cultural reasons without causing further damage to the native plants and their habitat.

== See also ==
- List of ecological reserves in Manitoba
- List of protected areas of Manitoba
