= Whitemouth Island Ecological Reserve =

Protected area in Manitoba, Canada

Coordinates: 49.2616°N 95.6980°W

- IUCN category Ia (strict nature reserve)
- Interactive map of Whitemouth Island Ecological Reserve
- Area: 6.13 km^{2} (2.37 sq mi)
- Established: 1999

Whitemouth Island Ecological Reserve is an ecological reserve which is the largest island of Whitemouth Lake in Manitoba. It was established in 1999 under the Manitoba Ecological Reserves Act. It is 6.13 square kilometres (2.37 sq mi) in size. The island is the most western example of a largely undisturbed deciduous forest of the St. Lawrence - Great Lakes region in Canada. It contains eight examples of eastern deciduous plants that are considered rare in Manitoba such as Dutchman's Breeches, green adder's mouth, blue cohosh, New Jersey tea, and enchanter's nightshade.

== See also ==
- List of ecological reserves in Manitoba
- List of protected areas of Manitoba
