= Ste. Anne Bog Ecological Reserve =

Protected area in Manitoba, Canada

Coordinates: 49.5970°N 96.4894°W

- IUCN category Ia (strict nature reserve)
- Interactive map of Ste. Anne Bog Ecological Reserve
- Area: 420 ha (1,000 acres)
- Established: 2015

Ste. Anne Bog Ecological Reserve is an ecological reserve located 5 kilometres (3.1 mi) east of Giroux, Manitoba, Canada. It was established in 2015 under the Manitoba Ecological Reserves Act. It is 4.2 square kilometres (1.6 sq mi) in size.

== See also ==
- List of ecological reserves in Manitoba
- List of protected areas of Manitoba
