= Brokenhead River =

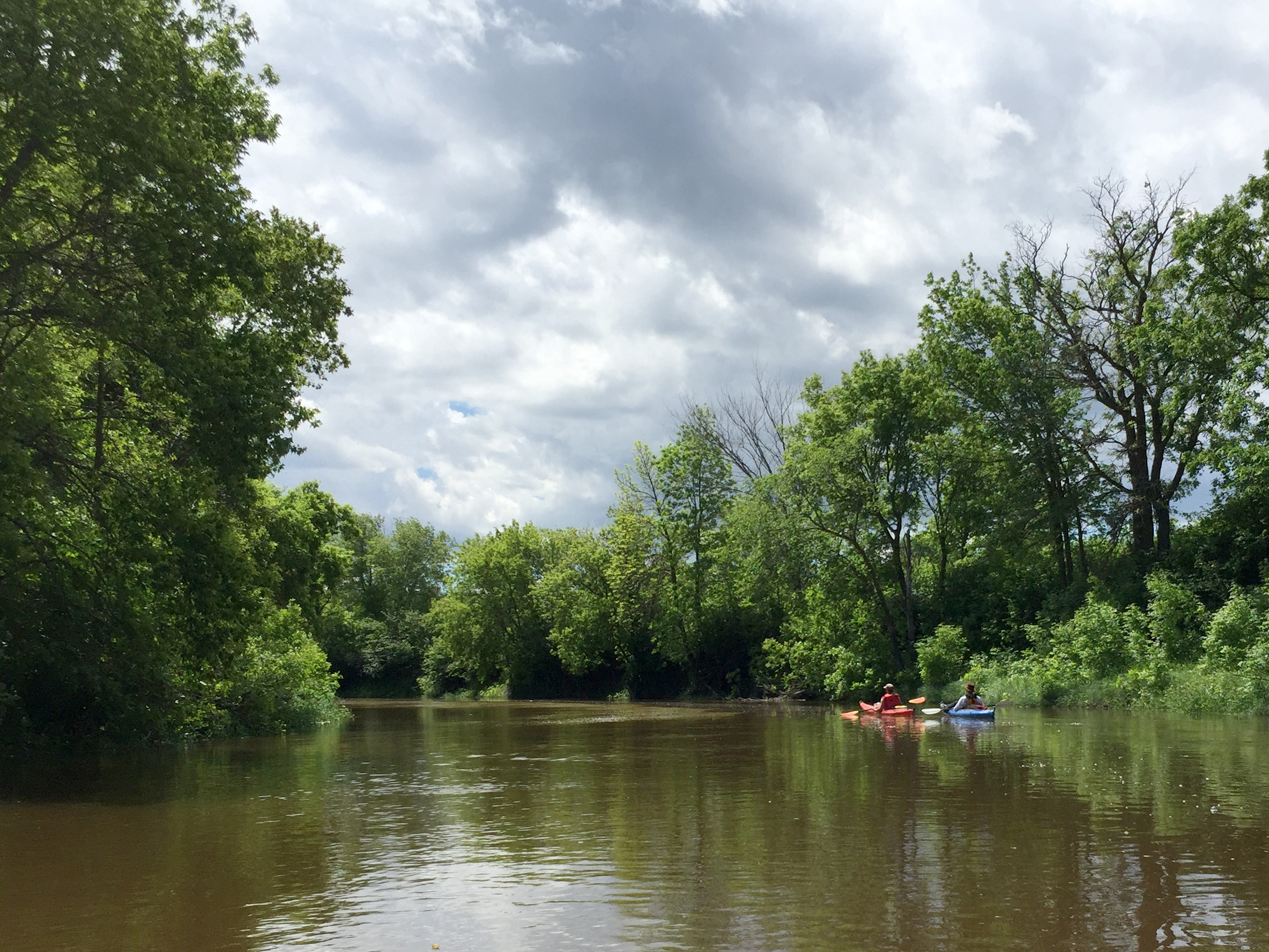
- Two kayaks drift on the Brokenhead River in Manitoba, 5 June 2016

Location
- Country: Canada
- Provinces: Manitoba

Physical characteristics
- Source
  - location: Manitoba
  - coordinates: 49°36′26″N 96°19′36″W
  - elevation: 307 m (1,007 ft)
- Mouth: Lake Winnipeg
  - location: Manitoba
  - coordinates: 50°22′56″N 96°42′56″W
  - elevation: 218 m (715 ft)
- Length: 107 km (66 mi)

The Brokenhead River is a river in eastern Manitoba, Canada. It flows north from its source in the Brokenhead Swamp within Sandilands Provincial Forest, to its mouth in Lake Winnipeg south of Stoney Point.

The Brokenhead is navigable by canoe for much of its length. Fishers based in the Brokenhead Ojibway Nation use the lower reaches of the river to access Lake Winnipeg.

Brokenhead River Ecological Reserve preserves 66 hectares (160 acres) of river-bottom forest adjacent to the river in the Rural Municipality of Brokenhead.

Hazel Creek joins the Brokenhead as a right tributary several miles north of PTH 15. Bears Creek joins as a right tributary south of Mile 76 road N. Beaver Creek joins as a left tributary south of PR 435.

The river passes by the localities of:

- Nourse
- Lydiatt
- St. Ouens
- Green Bay
- Green Oak
- Brokenhead
- Dencross
- Scanterbury

The river is bridged by:

- Trans-Canada Highway
- PTH 15
- PTH 44
- PR 435
- PR 317
- PTH 12
- PTH 59

== See also ==
- List of Manitoba rivers
