= Walter Cook Caves Ecological Reserve =

Protected area in Manitoba, Canada

- IUCN category Ia (strict nature reserve)
- Area: 3,235 ha (12.49 sq mi)
- Established: 2001

Walter Cook Caves Ecological Reserve is an ecological reserve located north of Grand Rapids, Manitoba, Canada. It was established in 2001 under the Manitoba Ecological Reserves Act. It is 32.35 square kilometres (12.49 sq mi) in size.

== See also ==
- List of ecological reserves in Manitoba
- List of protected areas of Manitoba
