= Stuartburn Wildlife Management Area =

Wildlife management area in Manitoba, Canada

- IUCN category III (natural monument or feature)
- Interactive map of Stuartburn Wildlife Management Area
- Coordinates: 49°6′41″N 96°41′23″W
- Area: 326 ha (810 acres)
- Established: 1997

Stuartburn Wildlife Management Area is a wildlife management area located 10 kilometres (6.2 mi) southwest of Vita, Manitoba, Canada. It was established in 1997 under the Manitoba Wildlife Act. It spans an area of 3.26 square kilometres (1.26 sq mi).

This area is home to plant species such as the Dakota slipper as well as the western prairie fringed orchid. There is a variety of animal species that can be found here, such as deer, grouse, fox, and black bears. Wild turkey have been seen as well. This area serves as a breeding ground for bird species such as the black-billed cuckoo and the bobolink.

== See also ==
- List of wildlife management areas in Manitoba
- List of protected areas of Manitoba
