= List of ecological reserves in Manitoba =

This is a list of ecological reserves in the Canadian province of Manitoba. Ecological reserves are designated by the Government of Manitoba under The Ecological Reserves Act. For a list of all protected areas in Manitoba, see the List of protected areas of Manitoba.

Name	Area
Armit Meadows Ecological Reserve	263 ha (650 acres)
Baralzon Lake Ecological Reserve	39,600 ha (98,000 acres)
Birch River Ecological Reserve	183 ha (450 acres)
Brokenhead River Ecological Reserve	64 ha (160 acres)
Brokenhead Wetland Ecological Reserve	1,240 ha (3,100 acres)
Cedar Bog Ecological Reserve	110 ha (270 acres)
Cowan Bog Ecological Reserve	518 ha (1,280 acres)
Holmgren Pines Ecological Reserve	73 ha (180 acres)
Jennifer and Tom Shay Ecological Reserve	7 ha (17 acres)
Kaweenakumik Islands Ecological Reserve	63 ha (160 acres)
Lake St. George Caves Ecological Reserve	.49 ha (1.2 acres)
Lake Winnipegosis Salt Flats Ecological Reserve	4,725 ha (11,680 acres)
Lewis Bog Ecological Reserve	5,370 ha (13,300 acres)
Libau Bog Ecological Reserve	180 ha (440 acres)
Little George Island Ecological Reserve	15 ha (37 acres)
Long Point Ecological Reserve	1,600 ha (4,000 acres)
Palsa Hazel Ecological Reserve	1,648 ha (4,070 acres)
Pelican Islands Ecological Reserve	130 ha (320 acres)
Piney Ecological Reserve	780 ha (1,900 acres)
Pocock Lake Ecological Reserve	205 ha (510 acres)
Red Rock Ecological Reserve	485 ha (1,200 acres)
Reindeer Island Ecological Reserve	13,860 ha (34,200 acres)
Ste. Anne Bog Ecological Reserve	415 ha (1,030 acres)
St. Labre Bog Ecological Reserve	3,840 ha (9,500 acres)
Walter Cook Caves Ecological Reserve	2,250 ha (5,600 acres)
Wampum Ecological Reserve	62 ha (150 acres)
Whitemouth Bog Ecological Reserve	5,020 ha (12,400 acres)
Whitemouth Island Ecological Reserve	613 ha (1,510 acres)
Whitemouth River Ecological Reserve	130 ha (320 acres)
Woodridge Ecological Reserve	515 ha (1,270 acres)
