= Whooping Crane Summer Range =

Wetland preserve in Alberta, Canada

- Location within Canada
- Location: Alberta and Northwest Territories, Canada
- Coordinates: 60°0′58″N 113°32′40″W
- Area: 16,895 square kilometres (6,523 sq mi)
- Governing body: Parks Canada

Ramsar Wetland
- Designated: 24 May 1982
- Reference no.: 240

Whooping Crane Summer Range is a 16,895-km^{2} wetland complex in the boreal forests of northern Alberta and southwestern Northwest Territories in Canada. It is the only natural nesting habitat for the endangered whooping crane. On May 24, 1982, it was designated a Ramsar wetland of international importance, one of two such sites in Wood Buffalo National Park (the other is Peace-Athabasca Delta). It is owned by the government of Canada, and is administered by Parks Canada with some input from Indian and Northern Affairs Canada. Encompassing the northeastern portion of Wood Buffalo National Park, about 2,300 km^{2} (14%) of the wetland is external to the park, on Crown land in the Northwest Territories. It is also classified an Important Bird Area.

The range is a complex of contiguous water bodies, primarily lakes and various wetlands, such as marshes and bogs, but also includes streams and ponds. In addition to the whooping crane nesting area, the range includes two sites classified during the International Biological Program.

Because the area developed through wildfires, "no natural forest fires in the area are extinguished unless they threaten structural facilities or...leave the boundaries of Wood Buffalo National Park".

A whooping crane census in 1941 counted only 15 migratory birds. Currently, 178 migratory birds winter and breed in coastal Texas, primarily in the Aransas National Wildlife Refuge. Annual population surveys are conducted by the Canadian Wildlife Service. A few breeding pairs of the peregrine falcon also nest in the range. Due to the significant threat of extinction of whooping cranes, access to nesting sites is strictly controlled, limited only to researchers and park staff, and low-flying aircraft are prohibited in the area.
