= Chitek Lake Anishinaabe Provincial Park =

Provincial park in Manitoba, Canada

- IUCN category II (national park)
- Location within Canada Location within Manitoba
- Interactive map of Chitek Lake Anishinaabe Provincial Park
- Location: Manitoba, Canada
- Coordinates: 52°24′N 99°30′W
- Area: 996 km^{2} (385 sq mi)
- Established: 2014
- Governing body: Government of Manitoba

Chitek Lake Anishinaabe Provincial Park is a provincial park designated by the Government of Manitoba in 2014. The park is 996 km^{2} (385 sq mi) in size. The park is considered to be a Class II protected area under the IUCN protected area management categories. Since 2016, Chitek Lake Anishinaabe Provincial Park has been co-managed with Skownan First Nation and is the first provincial park in Manitoba to be classified as a Indigenous Traditional Use Park.

== Wildlife ==
Chitek Lake Anishinaabe Provincial Park is home to Manitoba's only wild population of wood bison. Bison were first introduced in 1991, when the provincial government introduced 13 wood bison on the shores of Chitek lake. By the time the provincial park was established in 2014, it was estimated the size of the heard had grown to approximately 300 bison. Although the Chitek Lake area is outside the historic range of wood bison, it was thought that the area would nevertheless be well suited for wood bison habitation due to it still being within the Canadian boreal forest, as well as the site's relative isolation; shielding the heard from bovine tuberculosis and other diseases endemic to many other wood bison populations. For these reasons, the relocation of wood bison to Chitek Lake Anishinaabe Provincial Park is often viewed as a wood bison recovery program rather than a reintroduction program.

== See also ==
- List of protected areas of Manitoba
- Skownan First Nation
