= List of protected areas of Manitoba =

This list of protected areas of Manitoba, Canada, groups the protected areas administered by the Government of Manitoba through its parks and protected areas program.

Manitoba Parks and Protected Areas
Type	Number	Area		% Land area
Type	Number	Hectares	Acres	% Land area
Provincial Parks	94	4,679,278	11,562,750	7.12%
Wilderness Parks	4	2,353,130	5,814,700	3.62%
Natural Parks	18	1,053,641	2,603,600	1.62%
Heritage Parks	8	231	570	< 0.01%
Recreation Parks	51	3,249	8,030	< 0.01%
Park Reserves	13	1,269,027	3,135,830	1.95%
Ecological Reserves	30	79,767	197,110	0.12%
Total	218	4,759,045	11,759,860	14.45%

== National protected areas ==
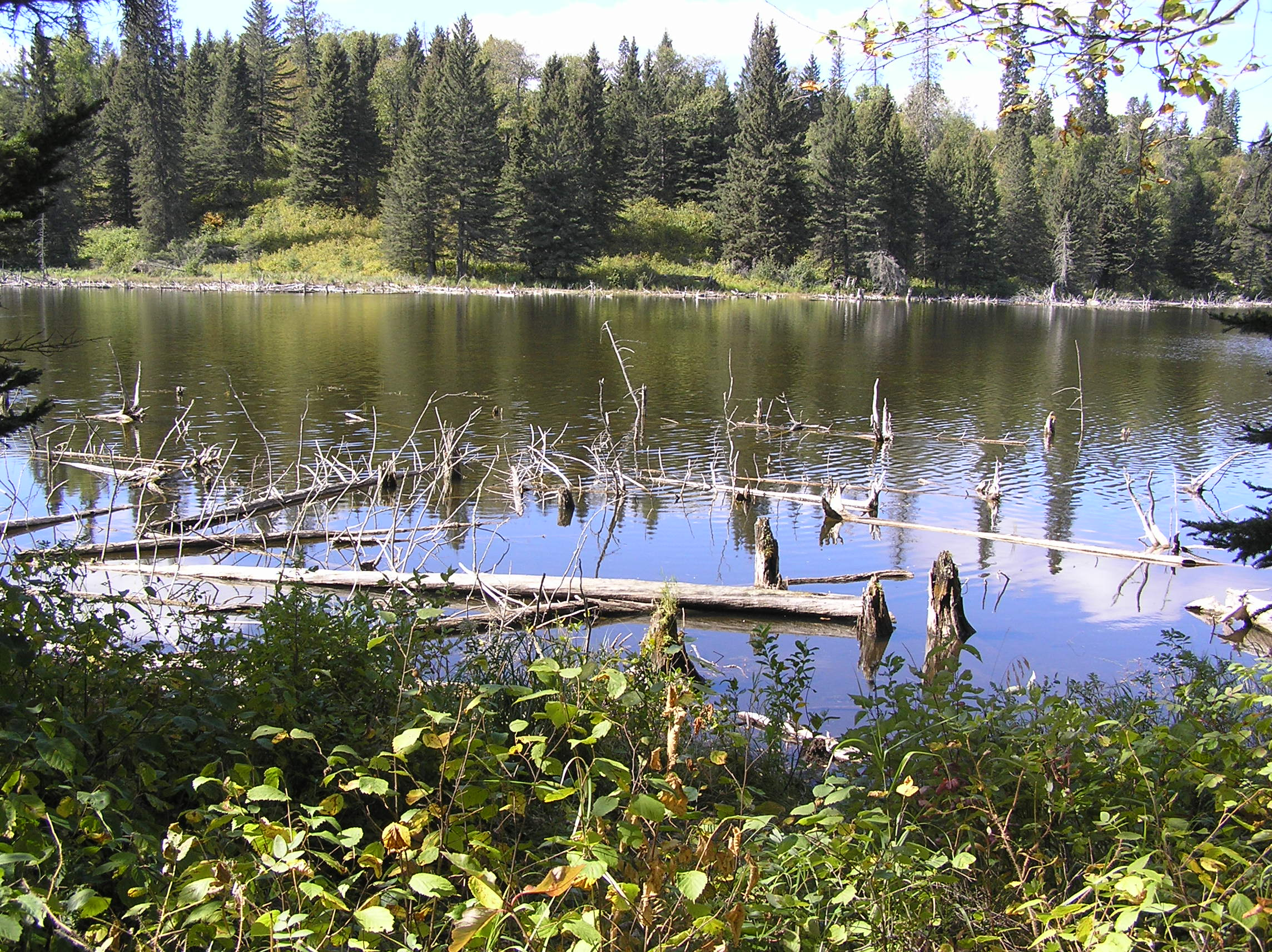
Riding Mountain National Park

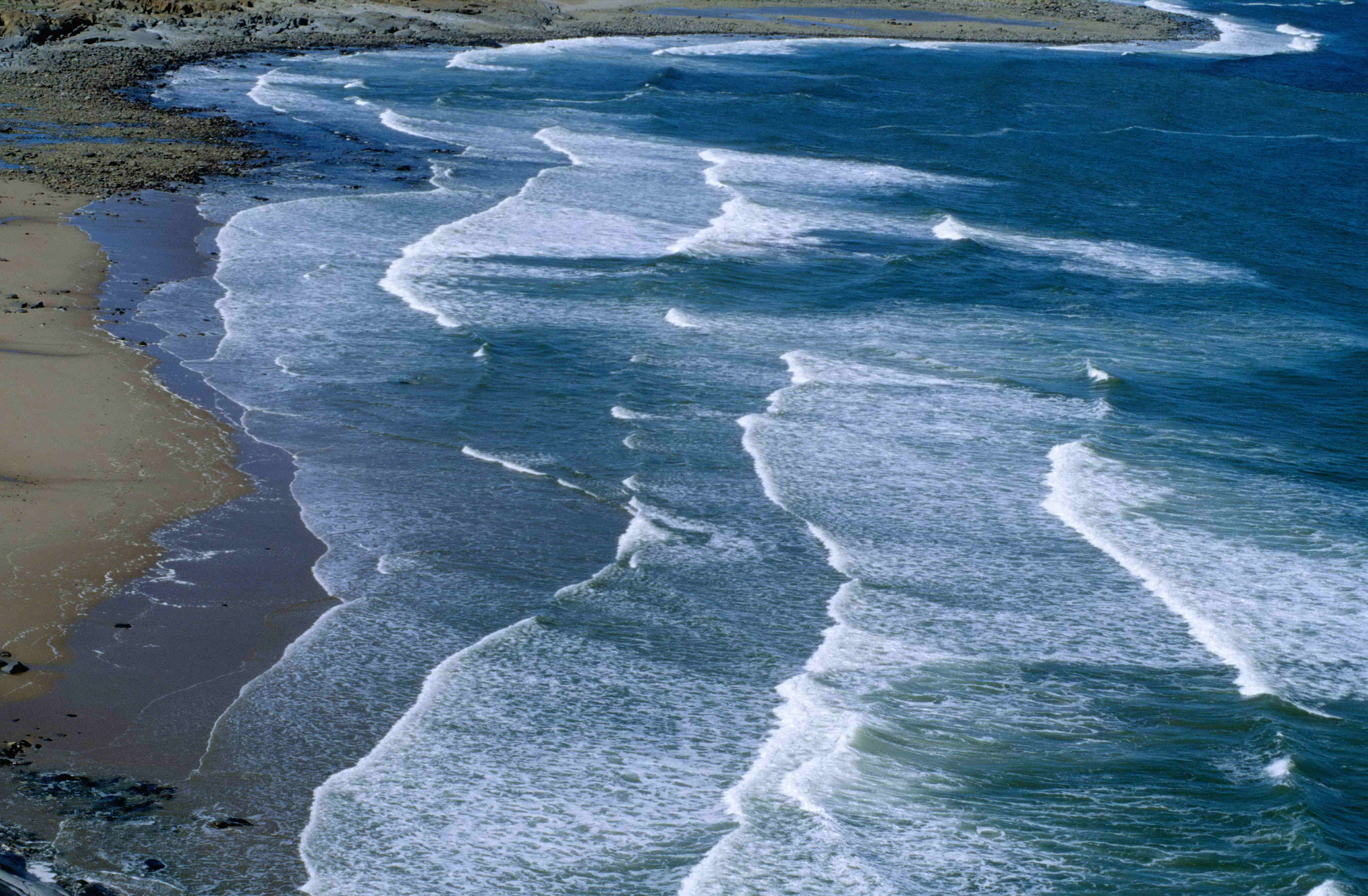
Hudson Bay, Wapusk National Park

National Protected Areas in Manitoba

Two national parks, overseen by Parks Canada, have been established within Manitoba:

- Riding Mountain National Park
- Wapusk National Park

Riding Mountain National Park forms the core of the Riding Mountain Biosphere Reserve (RMBR), a UNESCO World Biosphere Reserve.

== Provincial protected areas ==
Manitoba has 92 provincial parks. The provincial government has also established more than 50 protected areas under the Provincial Parks Act, overseen by the Manitoba Department of Natural Resources and Northern Development (previously by Manitoba Conservation and Climate). This legislation provides for parks to be dedicated for three purposes:

(a) to conserve ecosystems and maintain biodiversity;

(b) to preserve unique and representative natural, cultural and heritage resources;

(c) to provide outdoor recreational and educational opportunities and experiences in a natural setting.

Accordingly, the legislation distinguishes several types of park, and each provincial park must be classified as one of these types: Wilderness, Natural, Recreation, Heritage, and "any other type of provincial park that may be specified in the regulation." Land being considered for inclusion in a Provincial Park may be designated as a 'park reserve' for a limited period of time.

Other legislation provides the government with additional opportunities to set aside areas of the province for special protection

- The Forest Act includes the ability to establish provincial forests, as well as prohibiting logging in provincial parks.
- The Ecological Reserves Act includes the ability to establish ecological reserves.
- The Wildlife Act includes the ability to establish Wildlife Management Areas (WMA)
- The East Side Traditional Lands Planning and Special Protected Areas Act, which governs the traditional use for the area east of Lake Winnipeg.

There is also a series of lands privately owned by three conservation agencies that are part of the provincial protected areas network.

Provincial park reserves
Name	Area	Est'd
Amisk Park Reserve	198,000 ha (490,000 acres)	1994
Birch Island Park Reserve	79,000 ha (200,000 acres)	2000
Chitek Lake Park Reserve	100,300 ha (248,000 acres)	1999
Fisher Bay Park Reserve	84,150 ha (207,900 acres)	2000
Goose Islands Park Reserve	145 ha (360 acres)	2001
Grand Island Park Reserve	1,035 ha (2,560 acres)	2001
Kinwow Bay Park Reserve	8,400 ha (21,000 acres)	2001
Little Limestone Lake Park Reserve	4,095 ha (10,120 acres)	2007
Pelican Islands Park Reserve	600 ha (1,500 acres)	2001
Pemmican Island Park Reserve	22 ha (54 acres)	2001
Poplar-Nanowin Rivers Park Reserve	777,270 ha (1,920,700 acres)	1999

Traditional use planning areas
Name
Asatiwisipe Aki Traditional Use Planning Area
Ni-Kes Traditional Use Planning Area
Pauingassi Traditional Use Planning Area
Pimitotah Traditional Use Planning Area

== Regional/urban parks ==
There are several large local/regional parks in the city of Winnipeg, which are the responsibility of the municipal Department of Public Works.

Name	City area
Air Force Heritage Museum and Air Park	West – St. James
Assiniboine Forest	West – Charleswood
Assiniboine Park	West – Assiniboia
Bruce Park	West – St. James
Buhler Recreation Park	East
Bunn's Creek Centennial Park	North – North Kildonan
Central Park	Center – Downtown
Crescent Drive Park	South
Fraser's Grove Park	North – North Kildonan
John Blumberg Park	North
Kilcona Park	East – North Kildonan
Kildonan Park	North – West Kildonan
King's Park	South – Fort Garry
La Barriere Park	South
Little Mountain Park	Northwest
Living Prairie Museum (nature preserve)	
Maple Grove Park	South – St. Vital
Provencher Park	South – Saint Boniface
St. John's Park	North – North Point Douglas/North End
St. Vital Park	South – St. Vital
Stephen Juba Park	Center – Downtown
Vimy Ridge Memorial Park	Center – Downtown
Westview Park	West – St. James
Whittier Park	South – Saint Boniface

Other local parks in Manitoba include:

- Mystery Mountain Winter Park — a small ski park in Mystery Lake.
- International Peace Garden — a park located adjacent to the International Peace Garden Border Crossing between Manitoba and the U.S. state of North Dakota.
- Morden Research Station — an arboretum in Morden.
- Prairie Sentinels Park — a public park located in the centre of Deloraine.
- Stonewall Quarry Park — a park in the town of Stonewall.

== See also ==
- List of Canadian protected areas
