= OHSAA Southwest Region athletic conferences =

High school sports conferences

This is a list of high school athletic conferences in the Southwest Region of Ohio, as defined by the OHSAA. Because the names of localities and their corresponding high schools do not always match and because there is often a possibility of ambiguity with respect to either the name of a locality or the name of a high school, the following table gives both in every case, with the locality name first, in plain type, and the high school name second in boldface type. The school's team nickname is given last.

== Central Buckeye Conference ==
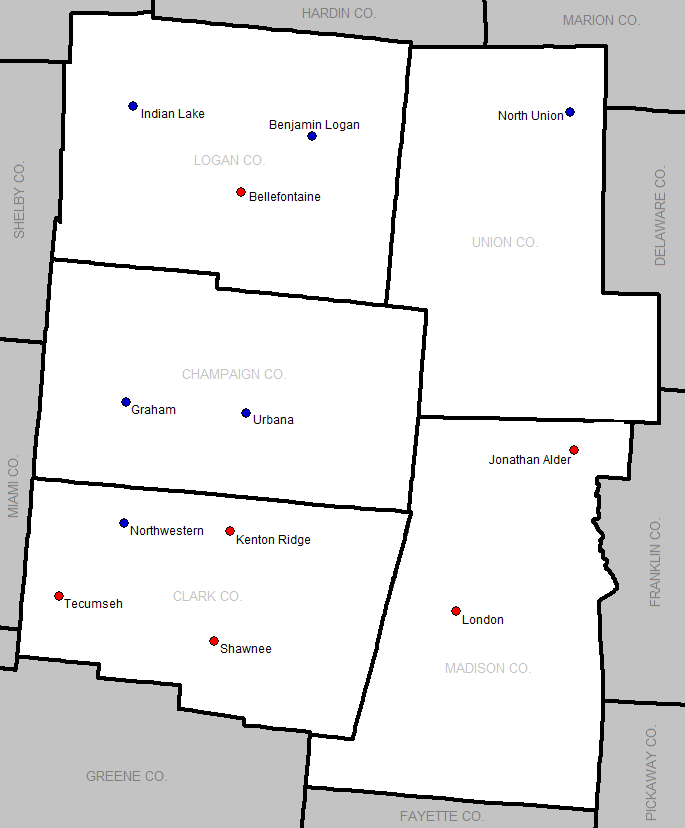
CBC membership as of the 2017-2018 school year. Kenton Trail Division members are in red, Mad River Division members are in blue, and future members are striped in their respective future division assignments.

Kenton Trail Division

- **Bellefontaine** Chieftains (1974-)
- Plain City **Jonathan Alder** Pioneers (2017-)
- Springfield **Kenton Ridge** Cougars (1977-)
- **London** Red Raiders (2017-)
- Springfield **Shawnee** Braves (1974-)
- New Carlisle **Tecumseh** Arrows (1991-)

Mad River Division

- Bellefontaine **Benjamin Logan** Raiders (2001-)
- St. Paris **Graham** Falcons (2001-)
- Lewistown **Indian Lake** Lakers (2001-)
- Richwood **North Union** Wildcats (2017-)
- Springfield **Northwestern** Warriors (1982-)
- **Urbana** Hillclimbers (1974-)

Former members

- Springfield **Greenon** Knights (1974-2017, to Ohio Heritage Conference)
- **London** Red Raiders (1974–78, to Central Buckeye League)
- Springfield **Northeastern** Jets (1974-2001, to Ohio Heritage Conference)
- Casstown **Miami East** Vikings (2001–06, to Cross County Conference)
- Riverside **Stebbins** Indians (2007-2016, to Greater Western Ohio)
- Tipp City **Tippecanoe** Red Devils (2001-2016, to Greater Western Ohio)

== Cincinnati Hills League ==
- Cincinnati **Deer Park** Wildcats (1985-)
- Cincinnati **Finneytown** Wildcats (1985-)
- Cincinnati **Indian Hill** Braves (1985-)
- Cincinnati **Madeira** Mustangs (1985-)
- Cincinnati **Mariemont** Warriors (1985-)
- **Reading** Blue Devils (1985-)
- North Bend **Taylor** Yellow Jackets (1989-)
- Cincinnati **Wyoming** Cowboys (1985-)

Former members

- **Cincinnati Academy of Physical Education** Crusaders (1985-1994, closed)
- **Loveland** Tigers (1985-1995, to Southern Buckeye Athletic Conference)

== Cincinnati Metro Athletic Conference ==
Blue Division

- **Cincinnati College Prep** Lions (2019-)
- Cincinnati **DePaul Cristo Rey** Bruins (No Football, 2024-)
- Cincinnati **Gamble Montessori** Gators (2019-)
- Cincinnati **Oyler** Madhatters (No Football, 2019-)
- Cincinnati **Creative & Performing Arts** Raiders (No Football, 2019-)
- Cincinnati **Shroder Paideia** Jaguars (2007-)
- Cincinnati **Spencer** Wolfpack (No Football, 2021-)

Red Division

- Cincinnati **Aiken** Falcons (2007-)
- Cincinnati **Hughes Center** Big Red (2007-)
- Cincinnati **Taft** Senators (2007-)
- Cincinnati **Western Hills** Mustangs (2007-)
- Cincinnati **Withrow** Tigers (2020-)
- Cincinnati **Woodward** Bulldogs (2007-)

Future member

- Cincinnati **Mount Healthy** Fighting Owls (2027-)

== Dayton City League ==
Dayton high schools were part of the Southwest Ohio Public League from 2002 to 2007, and played football in the same conference beginning in 2015.

- Dayton **Belmont** Bison (1956-2002, 2007-)
- Dayton **Dunbar** Wolverines (1931-2002, 2007-)
- Dayton **Thurgood Marshall** Cougars (2007-)
- Dayton **Meadowdale** Lions (1961-2002, 2007-)
- Dayton **Ponitz Career Technology Center** Golden Panthers (2009-)
- Dayton **Stivers School for the Arts** Tigers (1908-1976, 1996-2002, 2007-) (Football currently an independent)

Former members (all closed)

- Dayton **Kiser** Panthers (1908-1982)
- Dayton **Steele** Lions (1908-1940)
- Dayton **Patterson** Beavers (1922-2009)
- Dayton **Roosevelt** Roughriders (1923-1975)
- Dayton **Colonel White** Cougars (1929-2007)
- Dayton **Fairview** Bulldogs (1933-1982)
- Dayton **Roth** Falcons (1959-1982)
- Dayton **Wilbur Wright** Pilots (1940-1982)

== Eastern Cincinnati Conference ==
The Eastern Cincinnati Conference comprises teams mostly from larger schools in eastern Hamilton County and nearby counties in Greater Cincinnati.

- Cincinnati **Anderson** Raptors (2012-)
- Kings Mills **Kings** Knights (2012-)
- **Lebanon** Warriors (2020-)
- Morrow **Little Miami** Panthers (2020-)
- **Loveland** Tigers (2012-)
- **Milford** Eagles (2012-)
- Cincinnati **Turpin** Spartans (2012-)
- Cincinnati **Walnut Hills** Eagles (2012-)
- Batavia **West Clermont** Wolves (2017-)
- Forest Park **Winton Woods** Warriors (2020-)

Former Members

- Cincinnati **Glen Este** Trojans (2012-2017, consolidated into West Clermont)
- Cincinnati **Withrow** Tigers (2014–2020, to Cincinnati Metro Athletic Conference)

== Greater Catholic League ==
The GCL was restructured in 2013, as the Girls' Greater Catholic League was merged into the conference. The GGCL co-ed schools would merge into the same divisions as their GCL counterparts, while the single-sex schools were placed into the South Division.

(Co-Ed)

- Kettering **Archbishop Alter** Knights (1990–present)
- Dayton **Carroll** Patriots (2006–present)
- Dayton **Chaminade-Julienne** Eagles (1990–present)
- Middletown **Bishop Fenwick** Falcons (2006–present)
- Hamilton **Stephen T. Badin** Rams (1990–present)
- Cincinnati **Archbishop McNicholas** Rockets (1990–present)

South (Boys)

- Cincinnati **Elder** Panthers (1931–present)
- Cincinnati **La Salle** Lancers (1962–present)
- Cincinnati **Archbishop Moeller** Crusaders (1962–present)
- Cincinnati **St. Xavier** Bombers (1931–present)

South (Girls)

- Cincinnati **Mercy McAuley** Wolves (2018)
- Cincinnati **Mount Notre Dame** Cougars (formerly Mountaineers) (2013–present)
- Cincinnati **Seton** Saints (2013–present)
- Cincinnati **St. Ursula** Bulldogs (2013–present)
- Cincinnati **Ursuline Academy** Lions (formerly Hornets) (2013–present)

Former members

- **Hamilton Catholic** Rams (1949–1966)
- Cincinnati **McAuley** Mohawks (2013–2018, consolidated into Mercy McAuley)
- Cincinnati **Mother of Mercy** Bobcats (2013–2018, consolidated into Mercy McAuley)
- **Newport Catholic** (KY) Thoroughbreds (1949–1970)
- Cincinnati **St. Rita** Lions (1962–?)
- Cincinnati **Our Lady of Angels** (19??-1984)
- Cincinnati **Purcell Marian** Cavaliers (1931–2020, to Miami Valley Conference)
- St. Bernard **Roger Bacon** Spartans (1931–2020, to Miami Valley Conference)

== Greater Miami Conference ==
- Cincinnati **Colerain** Cardinals (1997-)
- **Fairfield** Indians (1966-)
- **Hamilton** Big Blue (1980-)
- Liberty Township **Lakota East** Thunderhawks (1997-)
- West Chester **Lakota West** Firebirds (1997-)
- **Mason** Comets (2007-)
- **Middletown** Middies (1966-)
- Cincinnati **Oak Hills** Highlanders (2000-)
- Sharonville **Princeton** Vikings (1966-)
- Montgomery **Sycamore** Aviators (1989-)

Former schools

- Hamilton **Garfield** Griffins (1966–80, consolidated into Hamilton)
- **Miamisburg** Vikings (1966–67)
- Hamilton **Taft** Tigers (1966–80, consolidated into Hamilton)
- West Chester **Lakota** Thunderbirds (1980–97, split into Lakota East & Lakota West)
- **Lima** Spartans (1980-2000, Independent)
- **Milford** Eagles (1989-2007, to Fort Ancient Valley Conference)

== Greater Western Ohio Conference ==
The GWOC was formed in 2001 as a merger of the Western Ohio League and Greater Miami Valley Conference.

There were 2 divisions prior to the 2020-2021 season. In 2020-2021, the divisions were done away with.

- **Beavercreek** Beavers (2001-)
- **Centerville** Elks (2001-)
- Kettering **Fairmont** Firebirds (2001-)
- **Miamisburg** Vikings (2006-)
- Clayton **Northmont** Thunderbolts (2001-)
- **Springboro** Panthers (2006-)
- **Springfield** Wildcats (2008-)
- Huber Heights **Wayne** Warriors (2001-)

=== Divisional Alignments ===
2001-06		2006-16			2016-19				2019-20	
2001-06		2006-16			National		American		2019-20	
East	West	Central	North	South	East	West	North	South	East	West
Beavercreek	Butler	Beavercreek	Butler	Fairborn	Beavercreek	Lebanon	Butler	Fairborn	Beavercreek	Lebanon
Centerville	Greenville (2001–05)	Centerville	Greenville (2010–16)	Lebanon	Centerville	Miamisburg	Greenville	Stebbins	Centerville	Miamisburg
Fairmont	Northmont	Fairmont	Piqua	Miamisburg	Fairmont	Northmont	Piqua	Trotwood	Fairmont	Northmont
Springfield North	Piqua	Northmont	Sidney	Springboro	Springfield	Springboro	Sidney	West Carrollton	Springfield	Springboro
Springfield South	Sidney	Springfield North (2006–08)	Trotwood-Madison	West Carrollton (2010–16)	Wayne		Tippecanoe	Xenia	Wayne	Trotwood-Madison
Wayne	Trotwood-Madison	Springfield South/Springfield	Troy	Xenia			Troy			
Xenia	Troy	Wayne								

Former Schools

- Vandalia **Butler** Aviators (2001-2019, to Miami Valley League)
- **Greenville** Green Wave (2001–2005, 2010-2019, to Miami Valley League)
- **Piqua** Indians (2001-2019, to Miami Valley League)
- **Sidney** Yellow Jackets (2001-2019, to Miami Valley League)
- Springfield **North** Panthers (2001–08, consolidated into Springfield)
- Springfield **South** Wildcats (2001–08, consolidated into Springfield)
- **Troy** Trojans (2001-2019, to Miami Valley League)
- **Xenia** Buccaneers (2001-2019, to Miami Valley League)
- **Fairborn** Skyhawks (2006-2019, to Miami Valley League)
- **West Carrollton** Pirates (2010-2019, to Miami Valley League)
- Riverside **Stebbins** Indians (2016-2019, to Miami Valley League)
- Tipp City **Tippecanoe** Red Devils (2016-2019, to Miami Valley League)
- **Lebanon** Warriors (2006–20, to Eastern Cincinnati Conference)
- **Trotwood-Madison** Rams (2001–20, Independent)

== Independents ==
- **Fayetteville-Perry** Rockets (Football only)
- Dayton **Stivers School for the Arts** Tigers (Football only)
- **Trotwood-Madison** Rams

== Metro Buckeye Conference ==
- Springfield **Emmanuel Christian Academy** Lions (no football, 2009-)
- Xenia **Legacy Christian Academy** Knights (no football, 1998-)
- Dayton **Miami Valley School** Rams (no football, 1999-)
- Franklin **Middletown Christian** Eagles (no football, 1998-)
- **Yellow Springs** Bulldogs (no football, 1998-)

Former members

- Fairfield **Cincinnati Christian** Cougars (1998-2005, to Miami Valley Conference)
- Springboro **Ridgeville Christian** Lions (2000–07, school closed)
- Sidney **Lehman Catholic** Cavaliers (football only, left in 2012)
- **Fort Loramie** Redskins (football only, left in 2012)
- **Troy Christian** Eagles (all sports except football, 1999-2021, to Three Rivers Conference)
- Dayton **Jefferson Township** Broncos (1998-2009, 2017–2022)
- Miamisburg **Dayton Christian** Warriors (football in Cincinnati Metro Athletic Conference, 2019–2025)

== Miami Valley Conference ==
Scarlet Division

- Cincinnati **Cincinnati Hills Christian Academy** Eagles (2003-)
- Cincinnati **Clark Montessori** Cougars (2004-)
- Cincinnati **North College Hill** Trojans (1984–87, 1992-)
- **Norwood** Indians (2017-)
- Cincinnati **Purcell Marian** Cavaliers (Football only 2019-2020, Full member 2021-)
- St. Bernard **Roger Bacon** Spartans (Football only, 2019-2020, Full member 2021-)
- Cincinnati **Summit Country Day** Silver Knights (1984-)

Grey Division

- Hamilton **Cincinnati Christian** Cougars (no football, 2003-)
- Cincinnati **Cincinnati Country Day** Nighthawks (1984-)
- **Lockland** Panthers (1984-)
- Cincinnati **Miami Valley Christian Academy** Lions (2017-)
- Hamilton **New Miami** Vikings (1984-)
- Cincinnati **Seven Hills** Stingers (no football, 1984-)
- Cincinnati **St. Bernard-Elmwood Place** Titans (1984-)

=== Football Divisions ===
Scarlet Division

- Cincinnati Hills Christian Academy
- Purcell Marian
- Roger Bacon
- Summit Country Day

Gray Division

- Cincinnati Country Day
- Clark Montessori
- North College Hill
- Norwood

Buckeye Division

- Lockland
- Miami Valley Christian Academy
- New Miami
- St. Bernard

Former members

- **Cincinnati College Prep** Lions (Football only, 2017-2020)
- Cincinnati **Landmark Christian** Eagles (1984-2004, school closed)
- **Batavia** Bulldogs (1985–89)
- Miamisburg **Dayton Christian** Warriors (Football only, 2013-2018)

== Miami Valley League ==
The Miami Valley League (MVL) began competition during the 1926–27 school year, when the MVL held its first league championship in track. Football and basketball began with the 1927–28 school year. The league operated through the 1974–75 school year, when the three long-time members of the league formed the Miami Central Conference with similar-sized schools. The Miami Valley League resumed competition during the 2019-2020 school year as part of a breakoff from the Greater Western Ohio Conference (GWOC )

Miami Division

- Vandalia **Butler** Aviators (2019-)
- **Greenville** Green Wave (1926–72, 2019-)
- **Piqua** Indians (1926–75, 2019-)
- Tipp City **Tippecanoe** Red Devils (1926–27, 2019-)
- **Troy** Trojans (1926–68, 2019-)

Valley Division

- **Fairborn** Skyhawks (1954–64, 2019-)
- **Sidney** Yellow Jackets (1926–75, 2019-)
- Riverside **Stebbins** Indians (2019-)
- **West Carrollton** Pirates (2019-)
- **Xenia** Buccaneers (1926–64, 2019-)

Former Schools

- **Miamisburg** Vikings (1926–66, to Greater Miami Conference, 1967–75, to Miami Central Conference)
- Dayton **Fairview** Bulldogs (1930–33, to Dayton City League)
- Kettering **Fairmont West** Dragons (1932–64, Fairmont before 1963, to Western Ohio League)
- **Oakwood** Lumberjacks (1948–53, to Southwestern Buckeye League)
- Lima **Central Catholic** T-Birds (1969–75)
- **Bellefontaine** Chieftains (1966–74, to Central Buckeye Conference)
- **Urbana** Hillclimbers (1966–74, to Central Buckeye Conference)
- Lima **Shawnee** Indians (1966–75)
- Springfield **Catholic Central** Fighting Irish (1970–75)

== Ohio Heritage Conference ==
The Ohio Heritage Conference is an OHSAA athletic league whose members are located in the Ohio counties of Champaign, Clark, Madison, Greene and Union. The league was established in the fall of 2001

North Division

- Milford Center **Fairbanks** Panthers (2016-) (Football in 2017)
- **Mechanicsburg** Indians (2001-)
- Springfield **Northeastern** Jets (2001-)
- North Lewisburg **Triad** Cardinals (2001-)
- **West Jefferson** Roughriders (2017-)
- **West Liberty-Salem** Tigers (2001-)

South Division

- Springfield **Catholic Central** Fighting Irish (2001-)
- **Cedarville** Indians (2001-)
- Jamestown **Greeneview** Rams (2001-)
- Springfield **Greenon** Knights (2017-)
- London **Madison-Plains** Eagles (2016-) (Football in 2017)
- South Charleston **Southeastern** Trojans (2001-)

== Shelby County Athletic League ==
- **Anna** Rockets (football member of the Midwest Athletic Conference, pre-1940-)
- **Botkins** Trojans (pre-1940-)
- Sidney **Fairlawn** Jets (1951-)
- **Fort Loramie** Redskins (football member of the Cross County Conference, pre-1940-)
- **Houston** Wildcats (pre-1940-)
- **Jackson Center** Tigers (pre-1940-)
- **Russia** Raiders (pre-1940-)

Former members

- Plattsville **Green Township** Griffins (pre-1940-51, consolidated into Fairlawn)
- **McCartysville** Mustangs (pre-1940-49, consolidated into Anna)
- Pemberton **Perry Township** Panthers (pre-1940-51, consolidated into Fairlawn)

== Southern Buckeye Athletic/Academic Conference ==
The conference was formed as the Clermont County League in 1919, and changed their name to the Southern Buckeye in 1987.

American Division

- **Batavia** Bulldogs (1919–85, 1989-)
- Clarksville **Clinton-Massie** Falcons (2001–05, 2017–)
- **Goshen** Warriors (1928–86, 2005-)
- **New Richmond** Lions (1919–57, 1969-)
- Mount Orab **Western Brown** Broncos (1972-)
- **Wilmington** Hurricane (2017–)

National Division

- **Bethel-Tate** Tigers (1919-)
- **Blanchester** Wildcats (1992–95, 2001-)
- Owensville **Clermont Northeastern** Rockets (Owensville before 1958, 1919-)
- Sabina **East Clinton** Astros (2001–12, 2017–)
- **Felicity-Franklin** Cardinals (no football, 1919-)
- **Georgetown** G-Men/Lady G-men (no football, 1997-)
- **Williamsburg** Wildcats (1919-)

Former Members

- Batavia **Amelia** Barons (1919–85, 2010-2017, consolidated into West Clermont)
- **Fayetteville-Perry** Rockets (football only, 2017–2024)
- Cincinnati **Glen Este** Trojans (1965–1967)
- **Hillsboro** Indians (1993-2003, to South Central Ohio League)
- **Loveland** Tigers (1919–36, 1995–97, to Fort Ancient Valley Conference)
- Greenfield **McClain** Tigers (2001–2003, to South Central Ohio League)
- **Milford** Eagles (1919–57)
- **Moscow** Bears (1928–1959, consolidated into New Richmond)
- Cincinnati **North College Hill** Trojans (1987–1992, to Miami Valley Conference)
- **Norwood** Indians (2012-2017, to Miami Valley Conference)

== Southwest Ohio Conference ==
- **Harrison** Wildcats (2012-)
- Cincinnati **Mount Healthy** Fighting Owls (2012-2027)
- Cincinnati **Northwest** Knights (2012-)

Former members

- Morrow **Little Miami** Panthers (2012–2020, to Eastern Cincinnati Conference)
- **Wilmington** Hurricanes (2012–2014, to South Central Ohio League)
- Trenton **Edgewood** Cougars (2012-2023, to Southwestern Buckeye League)
- Hamilton **Ross** Rams (2012-2023, to Southwestern Buckeye League)
- Oxford **Talawanda** Brave (2012-2025, to Southwestern Buckeye League)

== Southwestern Buckeye League ==
=== Southwestern Division (Bigger Schools) ===
- **Bellbrook** Golden Eagles (1975-)
- Trenton **Edgewood** Cougars (2023-)
- **Franklin** Wildcats (2006-)
- Monroe **Lemon-Monroe** Hornets (2006-)
- Hamilton **Ross** Rams (2023-)
- Oxford **Talawanda** Brave (2025-) (Football joins in 2027)

=== Buckeye Division (Smaller Schools) ===
- **Brookville** Blue Devils (1959-)
- **Carlisle** Indians (1975-)
- Miamisburg **Dayton Christian** Warriors (2025-) (Football joins in 2027)
- **Eaton** Eagles (1941–42, 1946–72, 1982-)
- Dayton **Oakwood** Lumberjacks (1953-)
- Middletown **Madison** Mohawks (1984-)
- Germantown **Valley View** Spartans (1975-)
- **Waynesville** Spartans (2001-)

Former Members

- **Bradford** Railroaders (1941–42)
- Vandalia **Butler** Aviators (1941–45, 1951–75)
- New Lebanon **Dixie** Greyhounds (1975-2021, to Western Ohio Athletic Conference)
- West Milton **Milton-Union** Bulldogs (1941–82, 2001-2021, to Three Rivers Conference)
- **Northridge** Polar Bears (1959-2021, to Three Rivers Conference)
- Camden **Preble-Shawnee** Arrows (1984-2021, to Western Ohio Athletic Conference)
- Tipp City **Tippecanoe** Red Devils (1941–82)
- **Versailles** Tigers (1944–51)
- Trotwood **Trotwood-Madison** Rams (1942–43, 1951–75)
- **West Carrollton** Pirates (1946–75)
- Englewood **Randolph Township** Bobcats (1954–59, consolidated into Northmont)
- Clayton **Northmont** Thunderbolts (1959–75)
- **Greenville** Green Waves (1972–82)

== Three Rivers Conference ==
This conference was formed in 2021 by members of the Cross-County Conference, Metro Buckeye Conference, Northwest Central Conference, and Southwestern Buckeye League.

- Tipp City **Bethel** Bees (2021-2026, from CCC)
- **Covington** Buccaneers (2021-, from CCC)
- Sidney **Lehman Catholic** Cavaliers (2021-, from NWCC)
- Casstown **Miami East** Vikings (2021-, from CCC)
- West Milton **Milton-Union** Bulldogs (2021-, from SWBL)
- **Northridge** Polar Bears (2021-, from SWBL)
- DeGraff **Riverside** Pirates (2021-, from NWCC)
- **Troy Christian** Eagles (2021-, from MBC)

== Western Ohio Athletic Conference ==
This conference was formed in 2021 by ten schools from the Cross-County Conference being joined by two schools from the Southwestern Buckeye League.

- **Ansonia** Tigers (2021-)
- **Arcanum** Trojans (2021-)
- **Bradford** Railroaders (2021-)
- New Lebanon **Dixie** Greyhounds (2021-)
- Pitsburg **Franklin Monroe** Jets (no football) (2021-)
- Union City **Mississinawa Valley** Blackhawks (2021-)
- New Paris **National Trail** Blazers (2021-)
- Pleasant Hill **Newton** Indians (no football) (2021-)
- Camden **Preble-Shawnee** Arrows (2021-)
- Lewisburg **Tri-County North** Panthers (2021-)
- New Madison **Tri-Village** Patriots (2021-)
- West Alexandria **Twin Valley South** Panthers (2021-)

== See also ==
- Ohio High School Athletic Association
