= Springfield Local School District =

Springfield Local School District may refer to any of three districts in Ohio, US:

- Springfield Local School District (Lucas County)
- Springfield Local School District (Mahoning County), Mahoning County
- Springfield Local School District (Summit County)

== See also ==
- Springfield City School District, Clark County, Ohio
- Springfield School District (disambiguation)
