= Blanchester, Ohio =

- Village
- Village of Blanchester
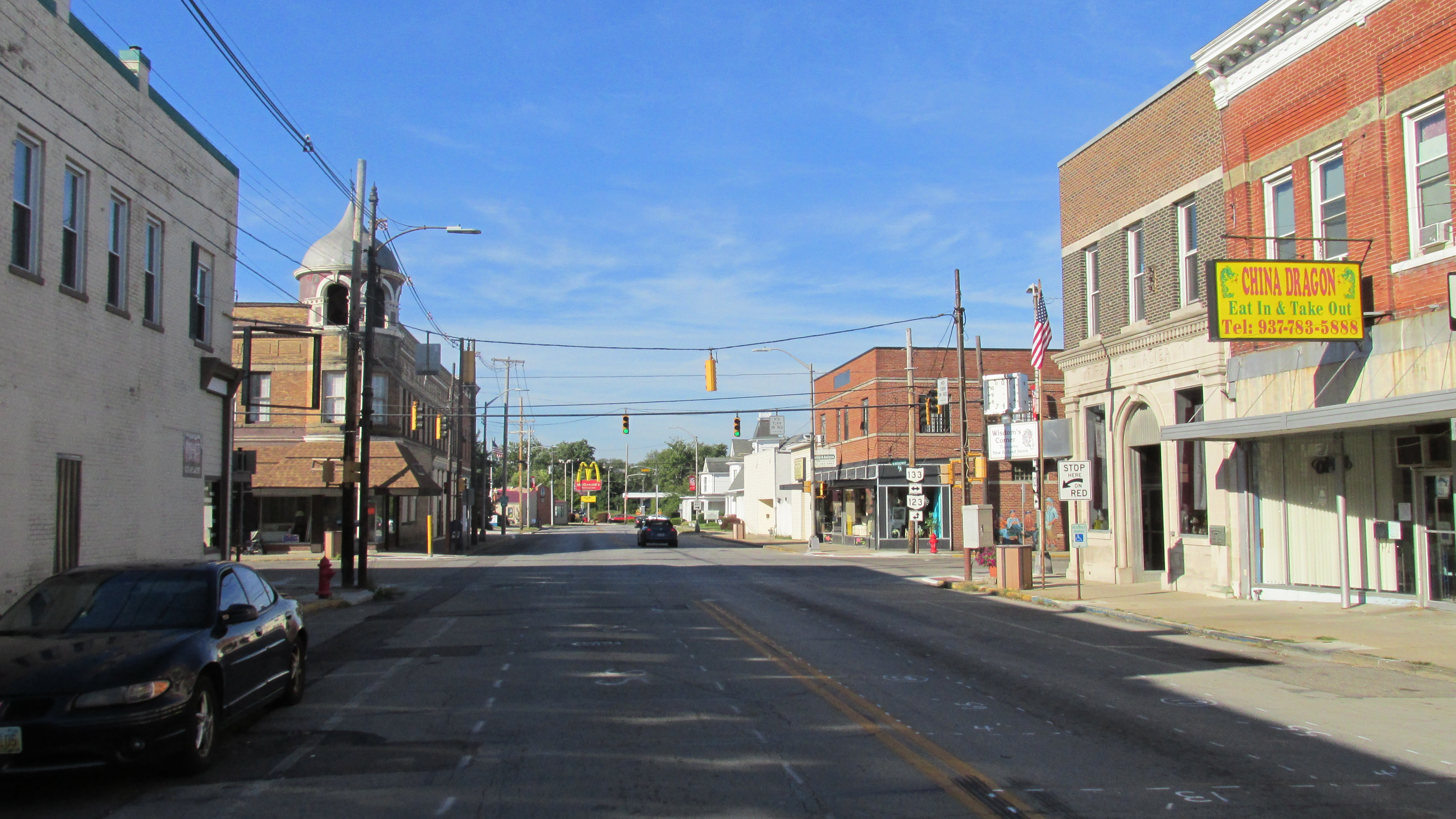
- Looking west at the intersection of Main and Broadway Streets in Blanchester

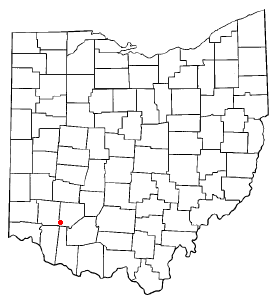
- Location of Blanchester, Ohio

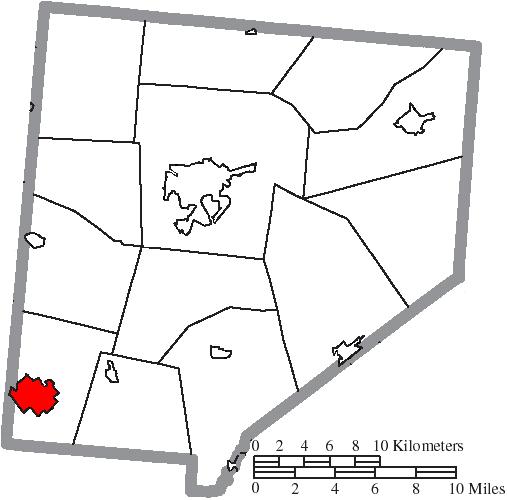
- Location of Blanchester in Clinton County
- Coordinates: 39°17′32″N 83°59′09″W
- Country: United States
- State: Ohio
- Counties: Clinton, Warren

Government
  - Mayor: John M. Carman

Area
  - Total: 4.18 sq mi (10.83 km^{2})
  - Land: 4.09 sq mi (10.59 km^{2})
  - Water: 0.093 sq mi (0.24 km^{2})
- Elevation: 971 ft (296 m)

Population (2020)
  - Total: 4,224
  - Estimate (2023): 4,221
  - Density: 1,033/sq mi (398.9/km^{2})
- Time zone: UTC-5 (Eastern (EST))
  - Summer (DST): UTC-4 (EDT)
- ZIP code: 45107
- Area codes: 937, 326
- FIPS code: 39-06908
- GNIS feature ID: 2398131
- Website: www.blanvillage.com

Blanchester is a village in Clinton and Warren counties in the U.S. state of Ohio. The population was 4,224 at the 2020 census. Blanchester is part of the Wilmington, Ohio Micropolitan Statistical Area, which is also included in the Cincinnati-Wilmington-Maysville, OH-KY-IN Combined Statistical Area.

== History ==
Blanchester was established in 1832 by Joseph and John Blancett, and named for them.

In March 2020, the historic Bindley Block building burnt down.

== Geography ==
According to the United States Census Bureau, the village has a total area of 4.25 square miles (11.01 km^{2}), of which 4.15 square miles (10.75 km^{2}) is land and 0.10 square miles (0.26 km^{2}) is water. There is no other community named "Blanchester" in the world.

== Demographics ==
Historical population
Census	Pop.	Note	%±
1860	553		—
1870	513		−7.2%
1880	776		51.3%
1890	1,196		54.1%
1900	1,788		49.5%
1910	1,813		1.4%
1920	1,671		−7.8%
1930	1,597		−4.4%
1940	1,785		11.8%
1950	2,109		18.2%
1960	2,944		39.6%
1970	3,080		4.6%
1980	3,202		4.0%
1990	4,206		31.4%
2000	4,220		0.3%
2010	4,243		0.5%
2020	4,224		−0.4%
2023 (est.)	4,221	▼	−0.1%
U.S. Decennial Census

=== 2020 census ===
As of the 2020 census, Blanchester had a population of 4,224. The median age was 40.6 years. 22.3% of residents were under the age of 18 and 18.9% of residents were 65 years of age or older. For every 100 females there were 96.0 males, and for every 100 females age 18 and over there were 92.3 males age 18 and over.

0.0% of residents lived in urban areas, while 100.0% lived in rural areas.

There were 1,710 households in Blanchester, of which 29.4% had children under the age of 18 living in them. Of all households, 41.6% were married-couple households, 20.3% were households with a male householder and no spouse or partner present, and 28.0% were households with a female householder and no spouse or partner present. About 30.6% of all households were made up of individuals and 13.0% had someone living alone who was 65 years of age or older.

There were 1,883 housing units, of which 9.2% were vacant. The homeowner vacancy rate was 2.0% and the rental vacancy rate was 5.9%.

Racial composition as of the 2020 census
Race	Number	Percent
White	3,960	93.8%
Black or African American	14	0.3%
American Indian and Alaska Native	4	0.1%
Asian	13	0.3%
Native Hawaiian and Other Pacific Islander	2	0.0%
Some other race	23	0.5%
Two or more races	208	4.9%
Hispanic or Latino (of any race)	40	0.9%

=== 2010 census ===
As of the census of 2010, there were 4,243 people, 1,636 households, and 1,113 families living in the village. The population density was 1,022.4 inhabitants per square mile (394.8/km^{2}). There were 1,854 housing units at an average density of 446.7 per square mile (172.5/km^{2}). The racial makeup of the village was 97.8% White, 0.4% African American, 0.3% Native American, 0.3% Asian, and 1.1% from two or more races. Hispanic or Latino of any race were 0.4% of the population.

There were 1,636 households, of which 34.8% had children under the age of 18 living with them, 47.9% were married couples living together, 14.4% had a female householder with no husband present, 5.7% had a male householder with no wife present, and 32.0% were non-families. 27.8% of all households were made up of individuals, and 11.9% had someone living alone who was 65 years of age or older. The average household size was 2.53 and the average family size was 3.08.

The median age in the village was 37.3 years. 25.5% of residents were under the age of 18; 8.1% were between the ages of 18 and 24; 26.4% were from 25 to 44; 24.5% were from 45 to 64; and 15.6% were 65 years of age or older. The gender makeup of the village was 47.1% male and 52.9% female.

=== 2000 census ===
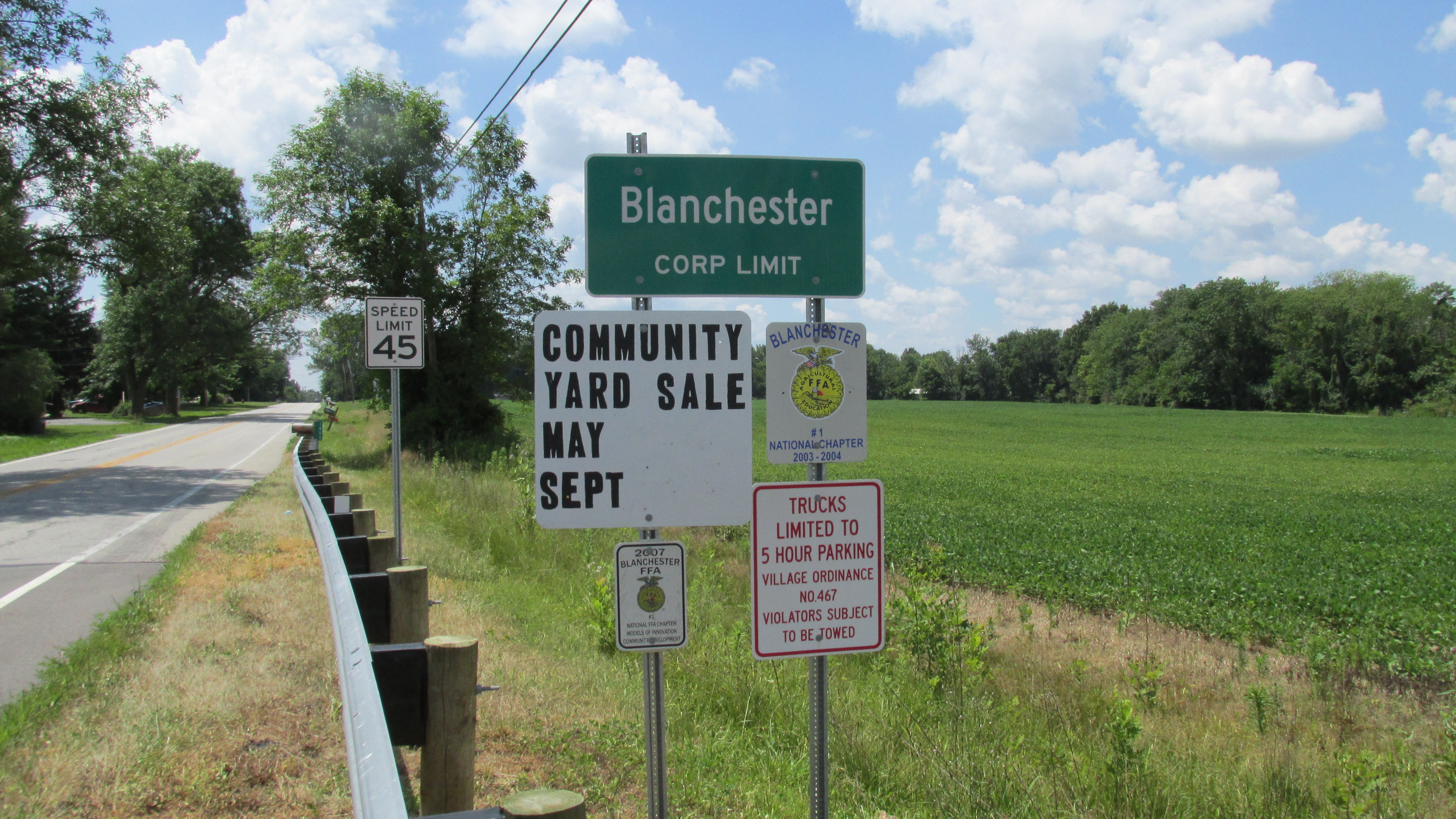
Blanchester corporation limit sign

As of the census of 2000, there were 4,220 people, 1,645 households, and 1,131 families living in the village. The population density was 1,424.8 inhabitants per square mile (550.1/km^{2}). There were 1,766 housing units at an average density of 596.3 per square mile (230.2/km^{2}). The racial makeup of the village was 98.70% White, 0.14% African American, 0.17% Native American, 0.36% Asian, 0.02% from other races, and 0.62% from two or more races. Hispanic or Latino of any race were 0.62% of the population.

There were 1,645 households, out of which 35.0% had children under the age of 18 living with them, 53.2% were married couples living together, 12.0% had a female householder with no husband present, and 31.2% were non-families. 27.8% of all households were made up of individuals, and 14.4% had someone living alone who was 65 years of age or older. The average household size was 2.49 and the average family size was 3.05.

In the village, the population was spread out, with 27.1% under the age of 18, 8.5% from 18 to 24, 27.3% from 25 to 44, 20.5% from 45 to 64, and 16.6% who were 65 years of age or older. The median age was 36 years. For every 100 females there were 85.6 males. For every 100 females age 18 and over, there were 80.9 males.

The median income for a household in the village was $35,608, and the median income for a family was $42,018. Males had a median income of $32,088 versus $24,531 for females. The per capita income for the village was $17,112. About 6.9% of families and 11.0% of the population were below the poverty line, including 12.4% of those under age 18 and 21.1% of those age 65 or over.

== Economy ==
As of 2015, Blanchester Showplace Cinemas was reported as having the cheapest run movie theater seating in America.

== Education ==
Blanchester Local School District consists of Putman Elementary School, an Intermediate School, Middle School & High School. The mascot is the Blanchester Wildcat. Blanchester Schools are known for academic excellence. Blanchester High School currently holds a Bronze national rating by U.S. News & World Report.

Blanchester has a lending library, the Blanchester Public Library.

== Notable people ==
- Clarence J. Brown - newspaper publisher, member of the United States House of Representatives, Lieutenant Governor of Ohio, and Ohio Secretary of State
- Clarence J. "Bud" Brown Jr. - newspaper publisher, member of the United States House of Representatives, and Secretary of Commerce
- Frank M. Casto, orthodontist and Past President of AAO and ADA
- Cooper Snyder, businessman and politician
