= Springfield School District =

Springfield School District or Springfield Public Schools may refer to:

- Springfield Schools District 186, Sangamon County, Illinois
- Springfield Public Schools (Massachusetts), Hampden County, Massachusetts
- Springfield Public Schools (Missouri)
- Springfield Township School District (New Jersey), Burlington County, New Jersey
- Springfield Public Schools (New Jersey), Union County, New Jersey
- Springfield City School District, Ohio
- Springfield School District (Oregon)
- Springfield School District (Delaware County), Pennsylvania
- Springfield Township School District, Montgomery County, Pennsylvania

== See also ==
- Springfield Local School District (disambiguation)
