= Batavia High School =

Batavia High School may refer to:

- Batavia High School (Illinois)
- Batavia High School (New York)
- Batavia High School (Ohio)
