= Blanchester High School =

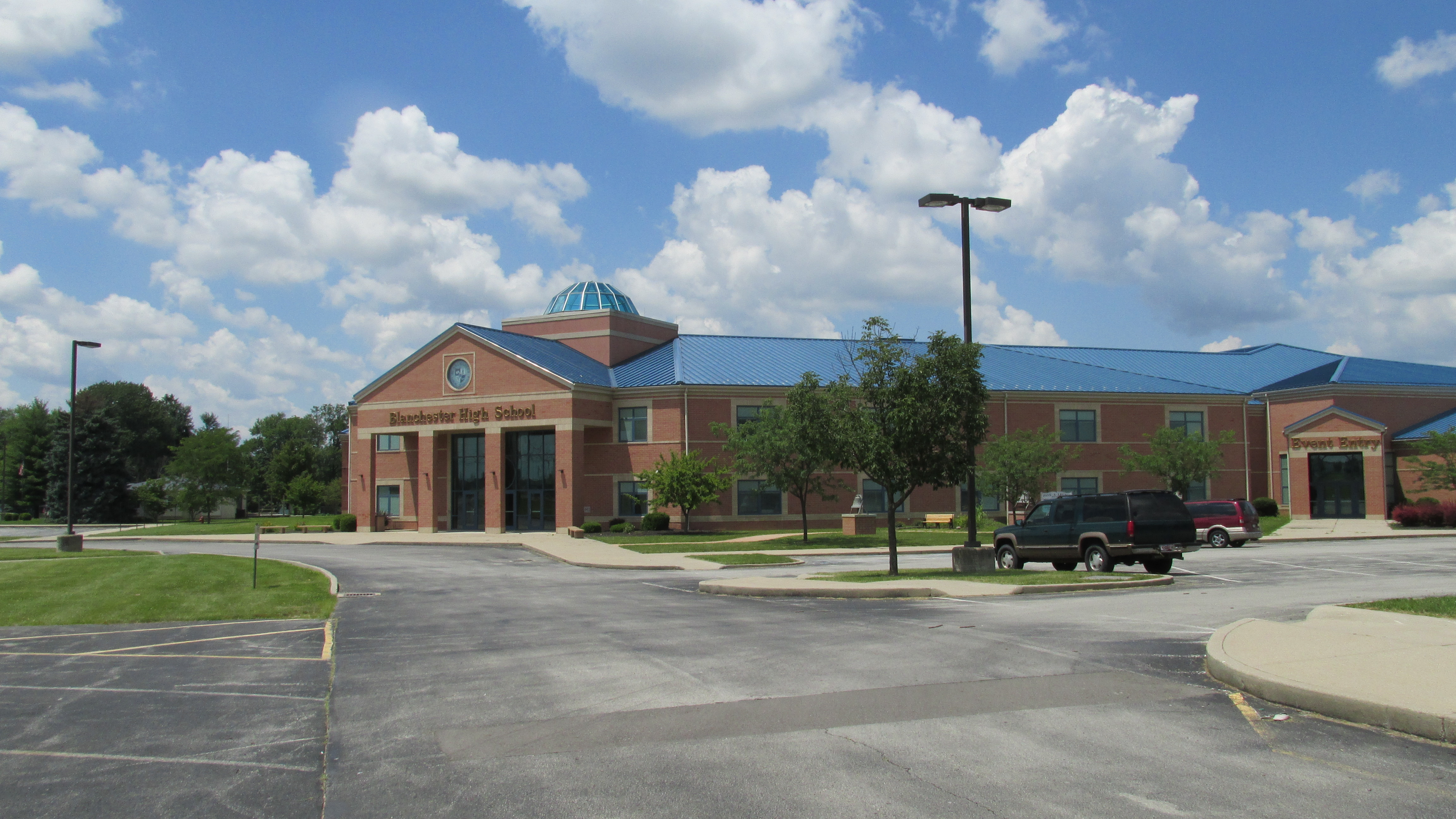

Location
- 953 Cherry Street; Blanchester, (Clinton County), Ohio 45107; United States; 39°17′56″N 83°58′6″W

Information
- Type: Public, Coeducational high school
- School district: Blanchester Local School District
- NCES District ID: 3904638
- Superintendent: Randy Dunlap
- NCES School ID: 390463802535
- Principal: Eric Lawson
- Teaching staff: 18 (FTE)
- Grades: 9–12
- Enrollment: 332 (2024-2025)
- Colors: Blue and White
- Athletics conference: Southern Buckeye Athletic/Academic Conference
- Team name: Wildcats
- Website: http://www.blan.org/

Blanchester High School is a public high school in Blanchester, Ohio. It is the only high school in the Blanchester Local Schools district. Its athletic program, known as the Wildcats, was a charter member of the Fort Ancient Valley Conference from 1964 until 1992. The school is now part of the Southern Buckeye Athletic/Academic Conference National Division. The building currently in use was opened in 2002.
