= Notre Dame High School (Hamilton, Ohio) =

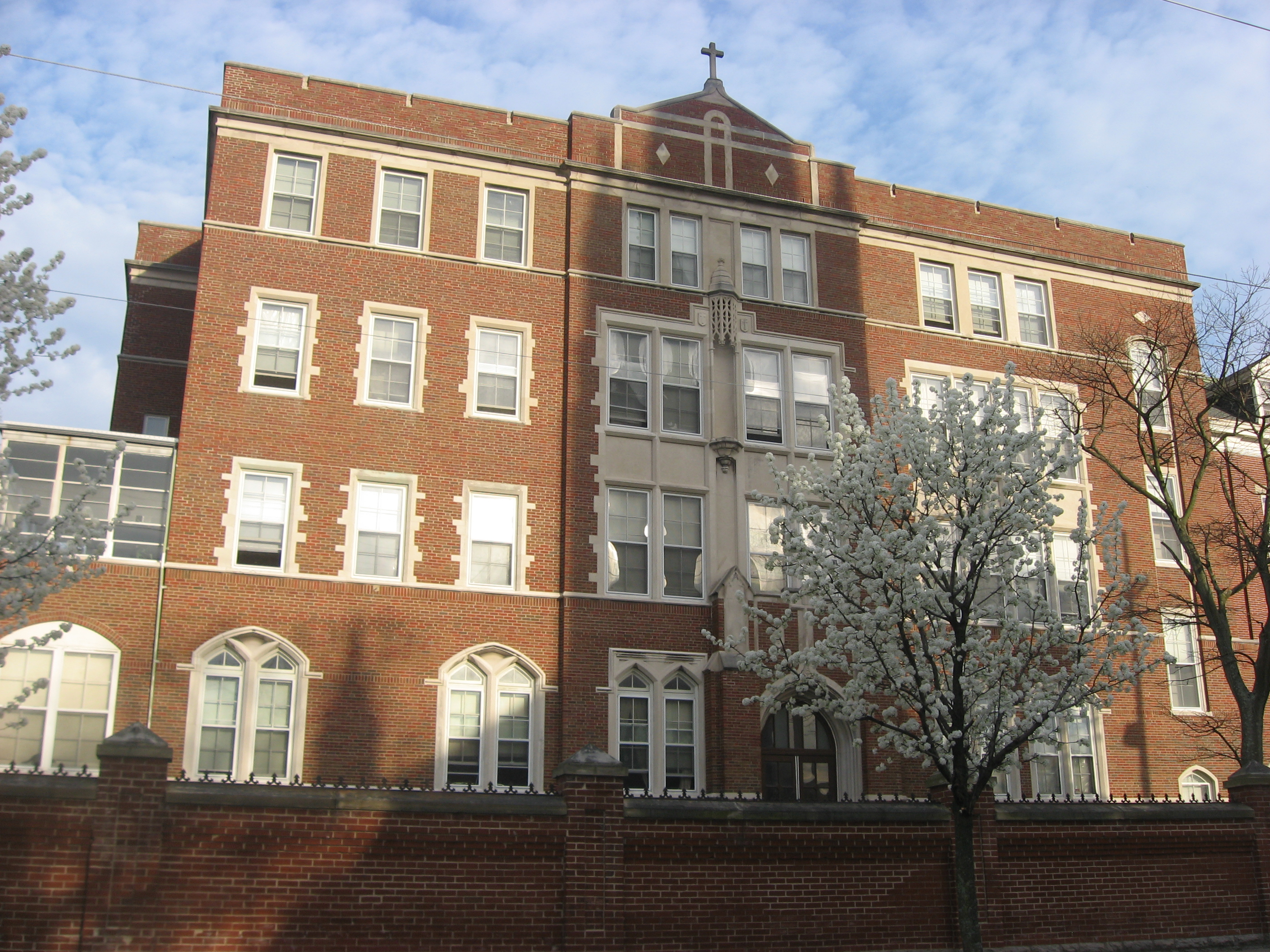
- Street view of the school building

Location
- 926 Second St. Hamilton, Ohio; 39.3909°N 84.5646°W

Information
- Type: Private, All-Female
- Religious affiliation: Roman Catholic
- Closed: 1966
- Grades: 9-12
- Notre Dame Academy and Notre Dame High School
- U.S. National Register of Historic Places
- Area: 1 acre (0.40 ha)
- Architect: Crowe and Schulte; Edward J. Schulte
- Architectural style: Greek Revival, Gothic Revival
- NRHP reference No.: 01000048
- Added to NRHP: February 2, 2001

Notre Dame High School opened up in the late 19th century on South Second Street across from St. Joseph's Church in Hamilton, Ohio. The school served as a Catholic high school for young ladies until 1966. The school's students were transferred to the newly opened Father Stephen T. Badin High School.

In 1924 due to increasing enrollment, the school built a new building that replaced two previous buildings on the same site. The building was listed on the National Register of Historic Places in 2001. It has since been refurbished and is currently a senior citizens apartment complex.

== See also ==
- Hamilton Catholic High School
