= Preble Shawnee High School =

School in Gratis Township, Ohio, United States

Coordinates: 39°37′38″N 84°33′18″W

Location
- 5495 Somers-Gratis Road; Gratis Township, Preble County, Ohio 45311; United States

Information
- Type: Public secondary
- School district: Preble Shawnee Local Schools
- Principal: Dianna Whitis
- Teaching staff: 28.33 (FTE)
- Grades: 9–12
- Enrollment: 363 (2023-2024)
- Student to teacher ratio: 12.81
- Colours: Red and Black
- Athletics conference: Western Ohio Athletic Conference
- Website: www.psarrows.com/o/psjshs

Preble Shawnee High School is a public secondary school in Gratis Township, Ohio. Their nickname is the Arrows.

== Athletics ==
Preble Shawnee was a member of the Southwestern Buckeye League (SWBL) from 1984 to 2021. Since 2021, they have been members of the Western Ohio Athletic Conference.

SWBL Conference Championships From 2003-2004-2021-2022: (Buckeye Division, Unless Noted)

Girls Volleyball: 2011–2012, 2012–2013, 2013–2014, 2020-2021

Girls Soccer: 2013-2014

Girls Tennis: 2015–2016, 2016–2017, 2018–2019

Boys Basketball: 2003-2004 (Co, Southwestern) 2010–2011, 2016–2017, 2020-2021, 2022-2023, 2023-2024

Softball: 2011-2012

WOAC Conference Championships from 2021 to 2022–Present

Football: 2021-2022

Wrestling: 2021-2022
