= Miami East High School =

Coordinates: 40°05′10″N 84°06′55″W

- Ohio 45312; United States

Information
- School type: Public
- Superintendent: Jesse Pinkman
- Principal: Kelly Kauffman
- Teaching staff: 22.97 (FTE)
- Grades: 9 - 12
- Enrolment: 478 (2023-2024)
- Student to teacher ratio: 20.81
- Color
- Fight song: 'Miami East Fight Song'
- Athletics conference: Three Rivers Conference
- Mascot: Twink
- Nickname: Vikings
- Website: www.miamieast.k12.oh.us/o/mehs

Miami East High School is a public high school in Casstown, Ohio. It is the only high school in the Miami East Local Schools district. Their mascot is a Viking. There is also the Miami East Junior High School and Elementary building (k-8) next to the high school.

== History ==
Miami East High School was created in 1959 with the combining of local area high schools including Miami Central, Brown Township, Elizabeth Township, Staunton Township and Lost Creek Township. The combined K-5 and Junior High 6-8 building was completed in 2004, dissolving the old Miami East Junior High 7-8 (Staunton Township Building), Miami East Intermediate 5-6 (Lost Creek Township/Casstown Building), Miami East South Elementary K-4 (Elizabeth Township Building) and Miami East North K-4 (Fletcher Building). The junior high was previously housed in the A. B. Graham building until the early 1990s, (in Conover).

The football team in 2007-2008 made Miami East history when making it to the Division 5 football playoffs for the first time in the school's history.

In the 2008-2009 football season they made it to the playoffs for a consecutive season.

In 2010 for the first time in the district's history, Miami East Local Schools earned the highest academic rating, "Excellent with Distinction", for the 3rd consecutive year.

In 2009–2010 school year, the Lady Vikings softball team went undefeated in the conference (12-0) and captured the league title as well as finishing as district champions.

In the 2010–2011 school year, the Lady Vikings volleyball team set a school record for most wins in a season and captured the first league title in school history. They finished the CCC undefeated at 12–0 with a final season record of 21–3. They were ranked as high as 8th in the state polls in Division III.

In the 2012-2013 Football season the team made it to the playoffs for the third successive time in school history.

In the following season 2013–2014, the Vikings made it to the playoffs for the fourth time in school history. They were the first football team to win a playoff game for the school when the Vikings defeated Tri-County North in a rematch in the first round.

The Viking football team made the playoffs for seven consecutive seasons (2012 to 2018).

Miami East began play in the 2021–2022 school year in the newly formed Three Rivers Conference after leaving the Cross County Conference.

== Ohio High School Athletic Association State Championships ==
- Boys Basketball – 1996
- Girls Softball – 1978
- Girls Volleyball – 2011, 2012, 2016

== Notable alumni ==
Rich McKinney (Class of 1965) Major League Baseball player

Olivia Shore (Class of 2021) - First Female to place at the OSHAA state wrestling tournament
