= Ross High School (Hamilton, Ohio) =

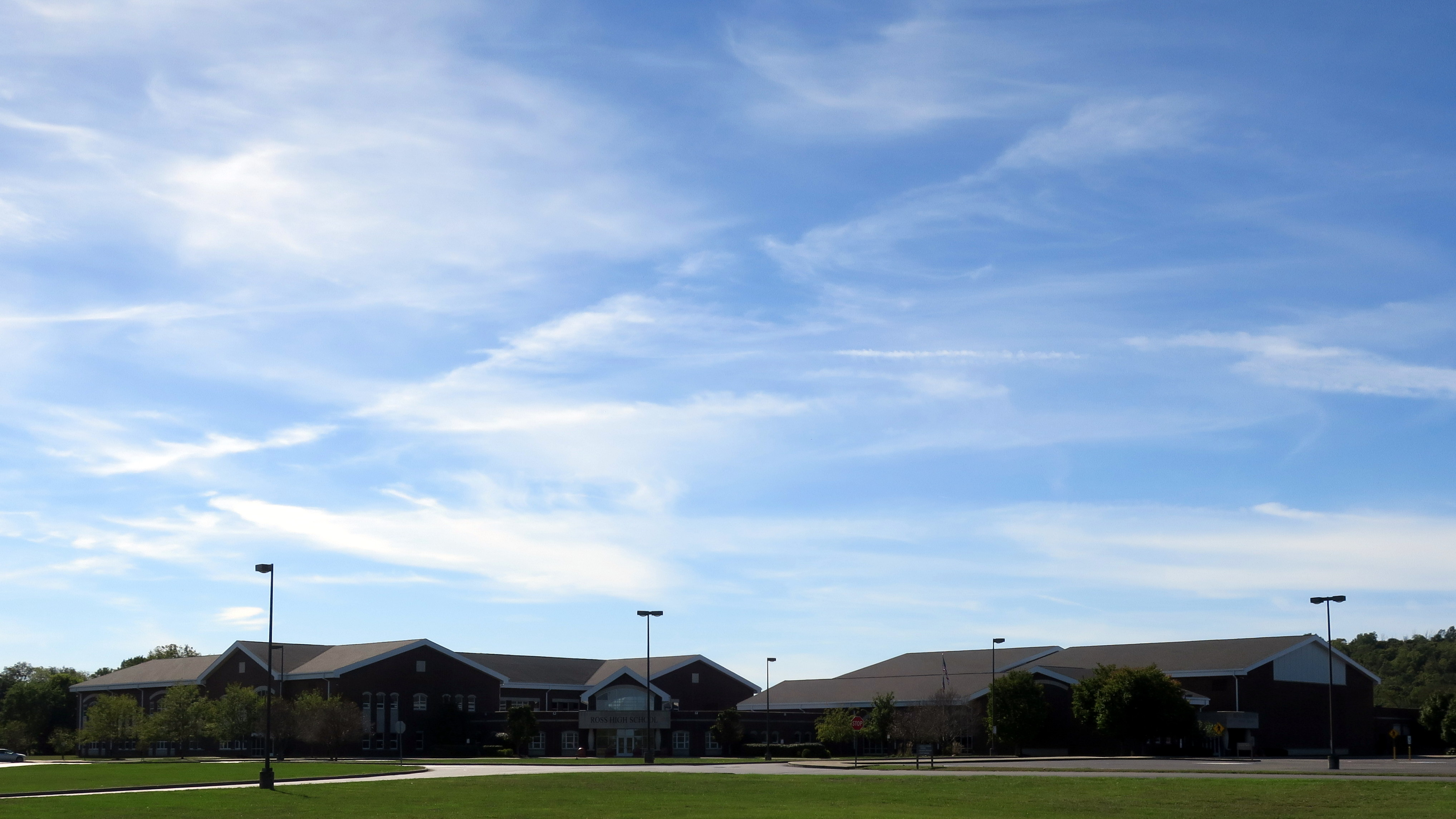

Location
- 3601 Hamilton-Cleves Road, Hamilton, OH 45013; Hamilton, (Butler County), Ohio 45013; United States; 39°19′57″N 84°38′0″W

Information
- Type: Public high school
- Status: Open
- School district: Ross Local Schools
- Superintendent: Scott Gates
- Principal: Brian Martin
- Teaching staff: 44.25 (on an FTE basis)
- Grades: 9–12
- Enrollment: 893 (2024–2025)
- Student to teacher ratio: 20.18
- Campus: Rural
- Colors: Maroon and Gold
- Fight song: On, Wisconsin! (Go Ross Rams!)
- Athletics: Football, Basketball, Baseball, Softball, Soccer, Cheerleading, Tennis, Golf, Track, Wrestling, Volleyball, Cross Country, Swimming, Competitive Cheerleading Club, Competitive Swimming
- Athletics conference: Southwestern Buckeye League
- Mascot: Rams
- Accreditation: North Central Association of Colleges and Schools
- Newspaper: Ross High Times
- Yearbook: Rossonian
- Communities served: Okeana, Shandon, Ross, Hamilton
- Feeder schools: Elda Elementary, Morgan Elementary, Ross Middle School
- Affiliation: SWOC
- Website: rhs.rossrams.com

Ross High School is a public high school in Ross Township, Butler County, Ohio, United States. It is the only high school in the Ross Local School District which serves Ross Township and Morgan Township. Ross High School has an enrollment of around 850 students. The school's mascot is the Ram. The Rams compete in the Southwest Ohio Conference (SWOC). In 2005, a new high school was built and the old high school became the middle school. At the beginning of the school year in 2015, Ross High School received the National Blue Ribbon Award.

== State championships ==
- Boys Basketball – 1980
- Girls Softball - 2009

== Notable alumni ==
- Simon Stepaniak, a drafted NFL player in 2020 for the Green Bay Packers but placed on the retired list in 2021.
