= Edythe Kirchmaier =

American social worker and centenarian (1908-2015)

- Born: Edythe King; January 22, 1908; Springfield, Ohio, U.S.
- Died: October 24, 2015 (aged 107)
- Education: Ohio State University, University of Chicago
- Occupations: Retired social worker; 42 year volunteer with organisation Direct Relief
- Known for: Oldest Facebook user; Oldest living former graduate of University of Chicago; Oldest registered driver in California
- Children: 2

Edythe Kirchmaier (née King, January 22, 1908 – October 24, 2015) was an American social worker, who, at age 105, was the oldest user of social media site Facebook, the oldest registered driver in California and the oldest living graduate of University of Chicago.

== Biography ==
She was the University of Chicago's oldest living former graduate, and resided in Santa Barbara, California. Kirchmaier attended Springfield High School in Ohio and graduated from Ohio State University in 1930. She spent spring quarters from 1931 to 1934 taking courses and doing field work. She also enrolled in the University of Rochester. She took a position in the welfare department of Cook County, Illinois and in a state welfare office, where she became a supervisor. She met her husband Joe Kirchmaier while working in state welfare and they married in 1938. They had 2 children.

She was the eldest registered driver in California and had a perfect record during her 86 years as a motorist. She was donated a Honda Civic to help her work with her organisation after her caravan was destroyed.

She was married for over 70 years. Her husband died in 2008 at age 98, when she was 100 years of age.

On January 22, 2013, she signed up to Facebook on her 105th birthday. Facebook engineers however had to "recode the system" to support her, as her birth year was not recognized. In retirement, she volunteered once a week for the charity Direct Relief.

== Media appearances ==
She was featured on The Ellen DeGeneres Show, The Tonight Show with Jay Leno, Today, and on the Oprah Winfrey Network program Super Soul Sunday, for her volunteer work at Direct Relief.

== Death ==
She died at the age of 107 on October 24, 2015.
