= Casstown, Ohio =

- Village
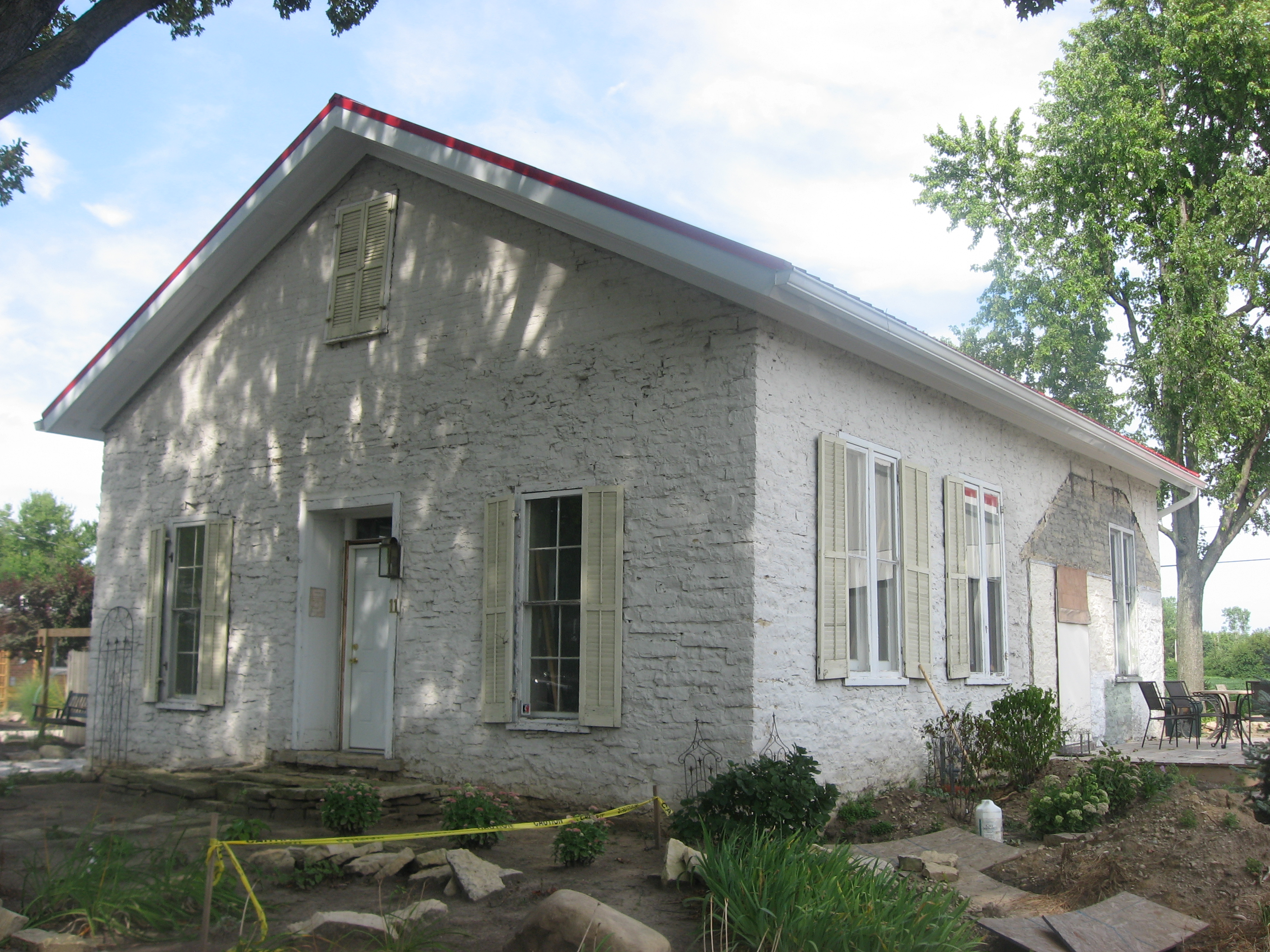
- Casstown Lutheran Stone Church

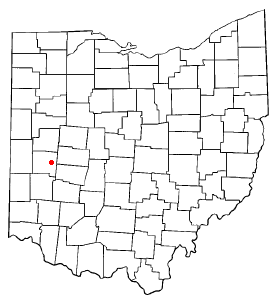
- Location of Casstown, Ohio

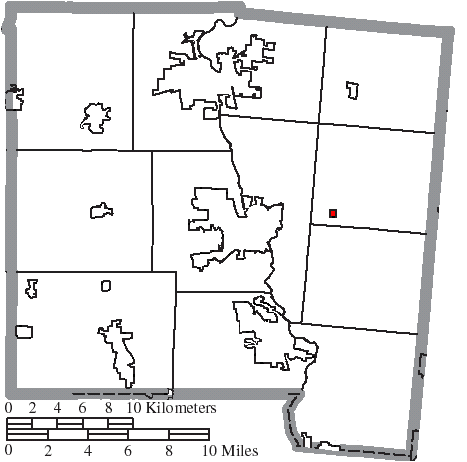
- Location of Casstown in Miami County
- Coordinates: 40°03′10″N 84°07′43″W
- Country: United States
- State: Ohio
- County: Miami
- Township: Lostcreek

Area
  - Total: 0.097 sq mi (0.25 km^{2})
  - Land: 0.097 sq mi (0.25 km^{2})
  - Water: 0 sq mi (0.00 km^{2})
- Elevation: 932 ft (284 m)

Population (2020)
  - Total: 270
  - Estimate (2023): 271
  - Density: 2,781.0/sq mi (1,073.76/km^{2})
- Time zone: UTC-5 (Eastern (EST))
  - Summer (DST): UTC-4 (EDT)
- ZIP code: 45312
- Area codes: 937, 326
- FIPS code: 39-12462
- GNIS feature ID: 2397572

Casstown is a village in Miami County, Ohio, United States. The population was 270 at the 2020 census. It is part of the Dayton Metropolitan Statistical Area.

== History ==
Casstown was originally called Trimmensburgh, and under the latter name was laid out in 1832 by one Mr. Trimmens, and named for him. The present name honors Lewis Cass, an American military officer, politician, and statesman. A post office called Casstown has been in operation since 1846.

== Geography ==
According to the United States Census Bureau, the village has a total area of 0.10 square miles (0.26 km^{2}), all land.

== Demographics ==
Historical population
Census	Pop.	Note	%±
1850	394		—
1860	232		−41.1%
1870	241		3.9%
1880	331		37.3%
1890	292		−11.8%
1900	262		−10.3%
1910	265		1.1%
1920	291		9.8%
1930	298		2.4%
1940	306		2.7%
1950	368		20.3%
1960	366		−0.5%
1970	380		3.8%
1980	331		−12.9%
1990	246		−25.7%
2000	322		30.9%
2010	267		−17.1%
2020	270		1.1%
2023 (est.)	271	▲	0.4%
U.S. Decennial Census

=== 2010 census ===
As of the census of 2010, there were 267 people, 113 households, and 71 families living in the village. The population density was 2,670.0 inhabitants per square mile (1,030.9/km^{2}). There were 122 housing units at an average density of 1,220.0 per square mile (471.0/km^{2}). The racial makeup of the village was 100.0% White.

There were 113 households, of which 30.1% had children under the age of 18 living with them, 46.9% were married couples living together, 10.6% had a female householder with no husband present, 5.3% had a male householder with no wife present, and 37.2% were non-families. 34.5% of all households were made up of individuals, and 14.2% had someone living alone who was 65 years of age or older. The average household size was 2.36 and the average family size was 3.07.

The median age in the village was 36.8 years. 24% of residents were under the age of 18; 11.2% were between the ages of 18 and 24; 27.7% were from 25 to 44; 23.6% were from 45 to 64; and 13.5% were 65 years of age or older. The gender makeup of the village was 46.8% male and 53.2% female.

=== 2000 census ===
As of the census of 2000, there were 322 people, 127 households, and 83 families living in the village. The population density was 3,017.0 inhabitants per square mile (1,164.9/km^{2}). There were 132 housing units at an average density of 1,236.8 per square mile (477.5/km^{2}). The racial makeup of the village was 100.00% White.

There were 127 households, out of which 28.3% had children under the age of 18 living with them, 56.7% were married couples living together, 6.3% had a female householder with no husband present, and 34.6% were non-families. 31.5% of all households were made up of individuals, and 15.7% had someone living alone who was 65 years of age or older. The average household size was 2.54 and the average family size was 3.17.

In the village, the population was spread out, with 25.5% under the age of 18, 9.3% from 18 to 24, 26.7% from 25 to 44, 23.6% from 45 to 64, and 14.9% who were 65 years of age or older. The median age was 40 years. For every 100 females there were 92.8 males. For every 100 females age 18 and over, there were 83.2 males.

The median income for a household in the village was $41,250, and the median income for a family was $48,333. Males had a median income of $31,250 versus $23,000 for females. The per capita income for the village was $16,296. About 2.6% of families and 4.3% of the population were below the poverty line, including 7.9% of those under age 18 and 5.6% of those age 65 or over.

== Education ==
The Miami East High School district's middle school was formerly located in Casstown. The district recently has built a new K-8 building around 2002 and has sold all other school buildings except the high school to private buyers. The building is now privately owned.

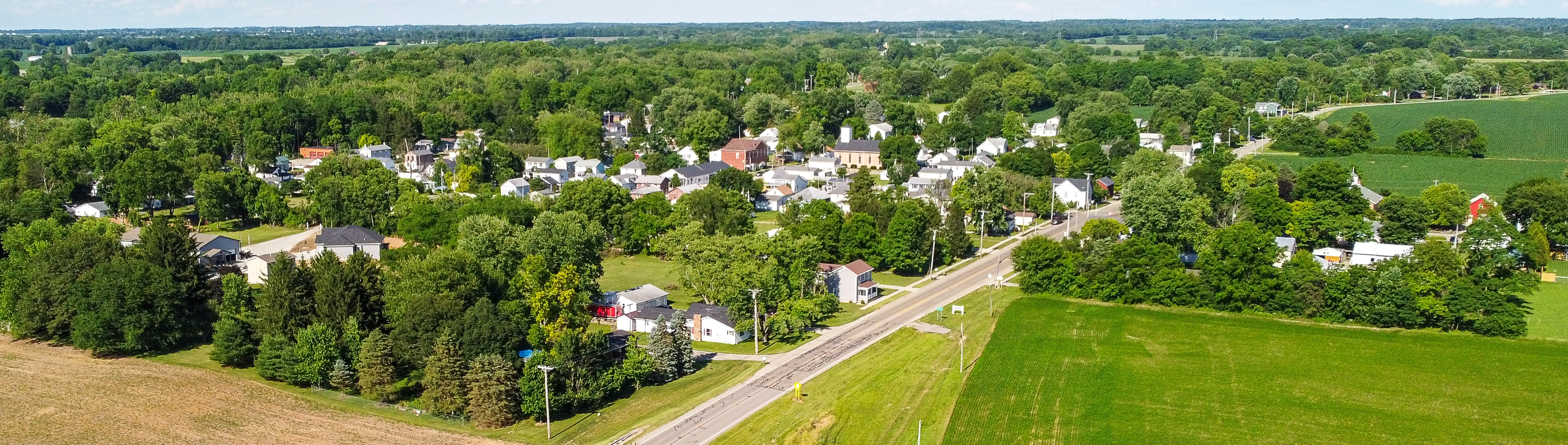
Casstown in 2020
