= Springfield High School (Springfield, Ohio) =

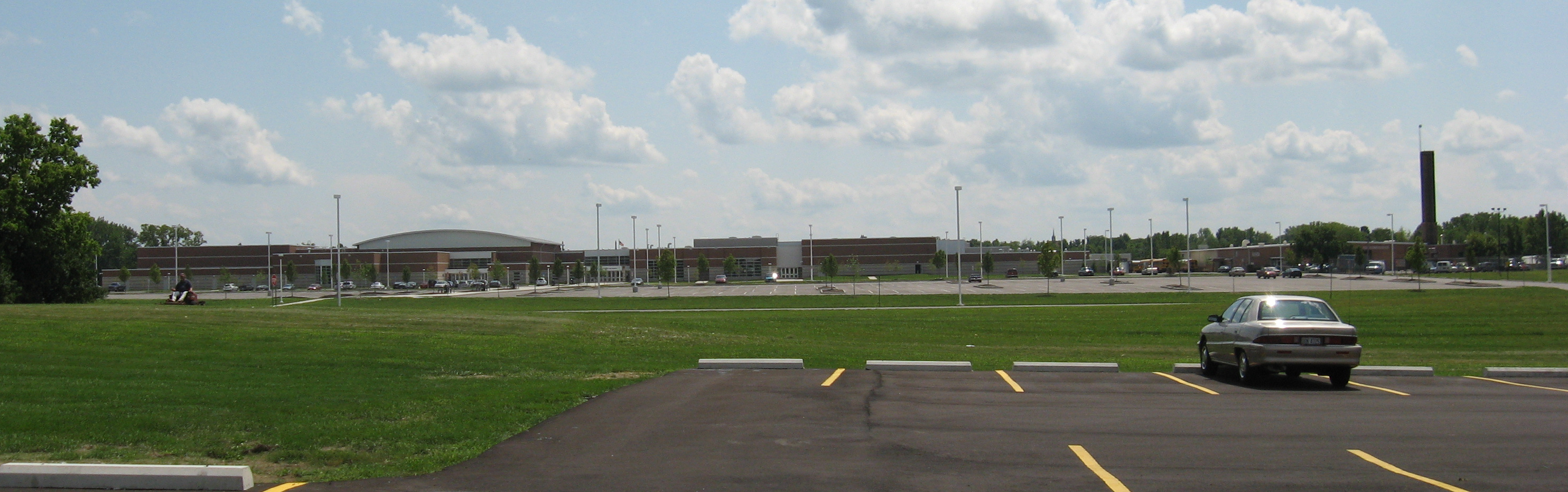
- Springfield High School campus in 2009

Location
- 701 East Home Road; Springfield, Clark County, Ohio 45503-2714; United States; 39°56′54″N 83°47′49″W

Information
- Type: Public high school
- Motto: Every Student. Every Opportunity. Every Day.
- Established: 1911 (original); 2008 (re-established)
- Closed: 1960–2008
- School district: Springfield City School District
- NCES District ID: 3904481
- School code: OH-044818-035527
- CEEB code: 364794
- NCES School ID: 390448101701
- Principal: Lisa Cunningham
- Teaching staff: 110.00 (on an FTE basis)
- Grades: 9–12
- Enrollment: 1,602 (2023–2024)
  - Grade 9: 486
  - Grade 10: 431
  - Grade 11: 353
  - Grade 12: 332
- Student to teacher ratio: 14.56
- Campus type: City: small
- Colors: Gold, white, and blue
- Athletics conference: Greater Western Ohio Conference
- Nickname: Wildcats
- Accreditation: Ohio Department of Education
- USNWR ranking: 11,279
- Feeder schools: Hayward, Roosevelt, & Schaefer Middle Schools
- Website: www.scsdoh.org/o/shs

Springfield High School (SHS) is a public comprehensive high school in Springfield, Ohio, United States. It is the only high school in the Springfield City School District, which includes the majority of the city limits.

It is administratively divided into five academies, but all classes are available to all students. The school was first established in 1911 and existed until 1960, when it split into two separate high schools, Springfield North and Springfield South. SHS was re-established in 2008 with the merger of North and South High Schools.

== History ==
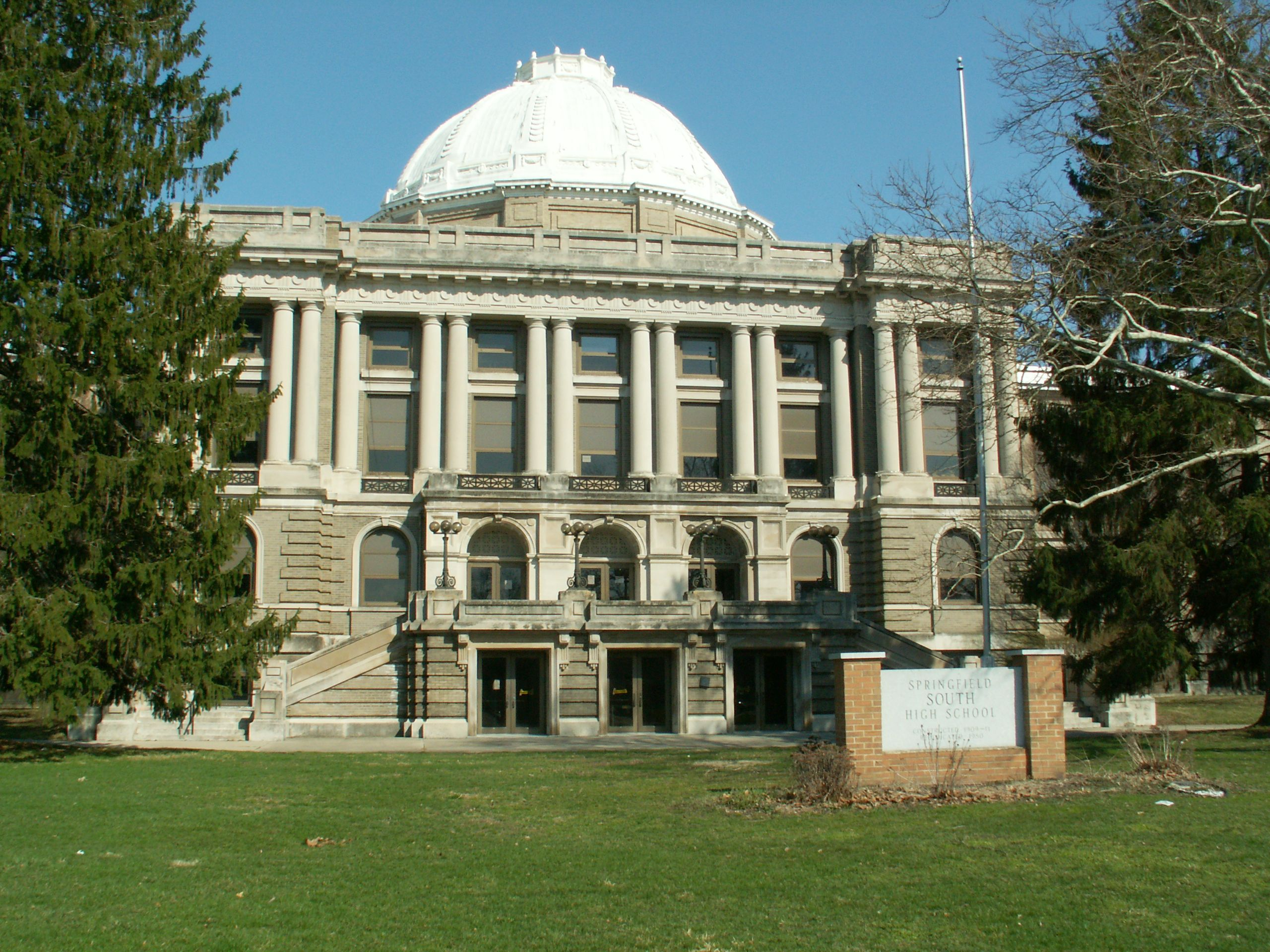
Original Springfield High School that later served as South High School, 1960–2008

The school was founded in 1911, then split into two high schools (North and South) in the fall of 1960. South High kept the original Springfield High School building, located at 700 South Limestone Street near the city's downtown, which was modeled after the Library of Congress and renowned for its large white dome. South also kept Springfield High's nickname, "Wildcats," and school colors of navy and gold. North High was nicknamed "Panthers" and used red, blue, and white as school colors. The two high schools shared Evans Stadium, which Springfield High used until North High built a stadium on the campus of its school. In 2008, North and South merged into "Springfield High School". A new high school building and campus were built at the location of the old North High. The new Springfield High took the "Wildcats" nickname, adopted blue, gold, and white as its colors, and continues to use Evans Stadium for football. It also uses the on-campus stadium North High, built for other sporting events. The school district uses the old Springfield High/South High building for administrative purposes but is no longer allowed to be used for teaching or classroom purposes per state guidelines.

In the second year of Springfield High School's reopening, a decision was made to change the names of the four small schools. Starting in the 2010–2011 school year, instead of having the four small schools Problem-Based Learning, Humanities, Leadership, and Global Perspectives, the fall of 2010 marked those four small schools' transformation into five separate academies. These academies allow each student to join with students and staff with similar interests and needs. The five academies are Preparatory Academy, Exploratory Academy, STEM Academy, International Arts & Communications Academy, and Health & Human Services Academy.

== Athletics ==
=== Basketball ===
During the final season of existence for the National Basketball League, after the Detroit Vagabond Kings left the NBL as the last team to essentially fold operations there during a season, the independently ran, all-black New York Renaissance barnstorming franchise were allowed express permission to join the NBL under short operations of time in the rest of its 1948–49 season, with the Rens moving their operations to Dayton, Ohio to play at Springfield High School under the new name of the Dayton Rens, though they would also inherit the Vagabond Kings' record of 2–17 at the time they first joined the league by late December 1948. Due to the nature and history of racial segregation and American sports at the time, including in the city of Dayton, the Dayton Rens would become the first fully integrated team in professional sports history in a league that had previously been considered all or mostly white-based up until that point in time. Unfortunately for the Rens, the inherited record from the Vagabond Kings franchise would prove to be too much for the Rens to overcome in their only season of professional play in the NBL, as they would get a 14–26 in the remaining 40 games they played, which was good enough for a fourth-place finish in their division they played in (despite the inclusion of the 2–17 record from Detroit giving them an overall total of 16–43), but didn't get them a playoff spot due to the awkward formatting of their division only having four official teams that season. The poor record combined with the racial segregation of the time period would led to the Rens joining the Hammond Calumet Buccaneers and Oshkosh All-Stars as one of three NBL teams from their side of things to be left out of the NBL-BAA merger that's now known as the National Basketball Association.

=== Football ===
Springfield competes in the Greater Western Ohio Conference in the Ohio High School Athletic Association. The Wildcats have been coached by NFL veteran Maurice Douglas since 2014. He has compiled a .598 winning percentage in eight seasons with appearances in the state semifinals in 2019 and 2020 and the state finals in 2021.

=== State championships ===
- Boys' cross country – 1938, 1940
- Boys' track and field – 1957, 1958
- Boys' basketball – 1925, 1950

== Notable alumni ==
- Ron Burton, professional football player in the American Football League; member of the College Football Hall of Fame
- Trey DePriest, professional football player in the National Football League (NFL)
- Alice Hohlmayer, professional baseball player in the All-American Girls Professional Baseball League
- Edythe Kirchmaier, centenarian known for being the oldest user on Facebook
- Johnny Lytle, boxer, jazz musician
- Henry Maier, Mayor of Milwaukee from 1960 to 1988
- Jim Rhodes, Governor of Ohio
- Jonathan Winters, comedian and actor
