= Batavia High School (Ohio) =

Location
- 1 Bulldog Place; Batavia; Batavia, Ohio, (Clermont County), Ohio 45103; United States; 39°4′21″N 84°7′42″W

Information
- Type: Public, Coeducational high school
- Opened: Current Building: 2023
- School district: Batavia Local Schools
- Superintendent: Keith Millard
- Administrator: Allen Holmes
- Principal: Andrea Conner
- Teaching staff: 28.00 (FTE)
- Grades: 9-12
- Average class size: 25
- Student to teacher ratio: 23.71
- Colors: Green and Black and White
- Song: 'Alma Mater'
- Fight song: 'Batavia Fight Song'
- Athletics conference: Southern Buckeye Conference
- Mascot: Bulldog
- Team name: Bulldogs
- Accreditation: North Central Association of Secondary Schools and Colleges Ohio Department of Education
- Yearbook: The Batavian
- Communities served: Village of Batavia
- Website: http://www.bataviaschools.org

Batavia High School is a public high school located in Batavia, Ohio. It is the only high school in the Batavia Local School District. Past enrollment has exceed 600 students. The school mascot is the Bulldog. The school is located 20 miles east of Cincinnati within the village of Batavia, which is a village of about 1,700 people and is the county seat of Clermont County, a county with a population of approximately 211,973. The school district encompasses the village and surrounding areas serving a total population of approximately 14,300. Batavia High School is a participant with the Southern Buckeye Conference, or SBAAC, and the rival of the Batavia Bulldog sports teams are the Williamsburg Wildcats who are located just 10 minutes away.

== History of Batavia High School ==
The village of Batavia was founded in 1814. The first settler in the area was Ezekiel Dimmitt, who often paid itinerant teachers to come school not only his children, but children of other locals throughout the area.

There had been several designated areas throughout the village for the teaching of children, including a public school established at a Presbyterian Church, which was a small frame building located on the east side of market street, with two teachers, and a wooden floor with a hold in it that was used for discipline. The other unofficial Establishment was a log malt house that was part of a deserted distillery at the head of Spring Street.

The next building to house the youth of Batavia include the first building built as a school, which was an eight-room brick building on the upper end of Main Street that can still be seen today, existing as a private residence and church. It was here that the citizens of Clermont County took advantage of the Akron Law, which provided for the establishment of school boards, and allowed for an organized school to be produced. On June 1, 1850, Batavia became the first community in Clermont County to take advantage of the Akron Law, and created the School of District #1 of Batavia Township, possessing a Board of Education and creating Batavia Local Schools. The first president of the schools was Edward Scofield.

In 1871, a tax levy passed for a new public school to be built on Broadway St. In 1872, the 2.71-acre lot was purchased for $759 with a final construction cost of $18,800. When the school was completed in 1873, it consisted of six large classrooms and a 24-78" lecture hall, which became the location of many village events for the following decades. It is believed that this school upon completion housed first through eighth grade, with enrollment in 1878-79 being 267 pupils. In the late 1870s, a three year High School program was offered with the first graduating class being 1881, with five graduates. With the exception of 1882, every year at Batavia High School since has had a graduating class. The program became four years by 1887. A separate small schoolhouse for non-whites was run by the village school district until integration in 1888.

By 1914, the school had become overcrowded to the point of holding two half day sessions. In 1915, a $30,000 bond was passed to build a new High School on the same property, with an additional $4,000 bond being passed the next year to finish construction. The new High School was dedicated on September 9, 1917 and was in use by the district as an Elementary School until the 2015–16 school year, being demolished in the spring of 2017. In 1929, the school colors were changed from Scarlet and Gray, to the Green and White of today.

In 1934, overcrowding again became a concern. A $57,000 bond was passed by the Village for an addition to the High School in 1935. While the addition was being constructed, five hotel rooms on Main Street were rented out to be used as temporary classrooms. Upon completion in November 1936, the total cost of the addition was $104,579.51 with the Public Works Administration (PWA) covering 45% of the cost. That year, the Batavia Village School District and the Batavia Township Rural School District merged with all students attending the school on Broadway Street. Four private bus drivers were hired to transport pupils who had previously attended Elmwood, Greenbriar, Elklick, and Olive Branch Elementary Schools. Afton Elementary School was split between Batavia and Williamsburg. A process of selling the former schoolhouses began that year.

In 1953, a bond passed for the construction of a New Elementary School on Broadway St, later being conjoined with the High School. This came to form the "Broadway Complex" used until spring of 2016 as the district's Elementary School.

In 1964, a levy passed to build a new High School at the end of Bauer Ave at the southern end of the Village. The building opened for the 1966–67 school year. In the mid 1980s, the building was expanded in three phases, with the last completed for the 1985–86 school year. A new library and several classrooms were some of the additions in these phases. In 1994, a levy for a new High School passed, and the High School on Bauer would serve as a Middle School for nearly three decades. It was last used for the 2022–23 school year.

The location for the new High School was chosen to be a 58.7-acre property that had access to both Old St rt 32, as well as Batavia Rd directly across from the former Batavia Ford Motor Plant. In 1997, the High School opened and served the district until the 2023–24 school year, where the academic wing was demolished to build a new road on campus. The athletic facilities, cafeteria, front offices, music department, and science classrooms remain, and continue to be used by the school district and local community for certain activities.

With a New Elementary School being opened for 2016-17, and both new Middle and High School buildings opening for 2023-24, all 3 buildings reside on the same campus off of Old St Rt. 32 and Batavia Rd.

== Student body ==
At Batavia High School, of the total enrolled, about 9% are part of a minority group, with American Indian/Alaskan Native enrollment being 0.4%, Asian enrollment being 0.4%, African American enrollment being 2%, Hispanic enrollment being 2%, and two or more races being 4%. White enrollment takes up 91% of the student body. Gender is split 50%-50%, and the total percentage of economically disadvantaged students at Batavia High School is 38%.

== Academics ==
Approximately 625 students attend Batavia High School, with 528 attending the High school campus full-time, and the rest either to the Great Oaks Career Center or full-time at the college campuses for CCP credit.

Batavia High School offers a few Advanced Placement (AP) classes, including:

- AP Biology
- AP Calculus AB
- AP Chemistry
- AP Computer Science Principles
- AP English Language and Composition
- AP English Literature and Composition
- AP Environmental Science
- AP Physics 1
- AP Psychology
- AP Spanish Language and Culture
- AP Spanish Literature and Culture
- AP United States Government and Politics
- AP U.S. History
- AP World History

The AP participation rate is 23% at Batavia High School.

Batavia High school also offers a variety of tests at its facilities, offering the ASVAB test on two separate dates in the 2015–2016 school year, as well as the American Legion's Americanism Test two separate years, in the 2013–2014 and 2015–2016 school years. Batavia High School seats several sittings of the ACT, offering four sittings in the 2015–2016 school year. Batavia also offers a sitting for the PSAT/NMSQT.

Further, Batavia High School has become more involved with the newly created CCP, or College Credit Plus programs created to allow High school students to take college credits at local universities. Batavia High School students are eligible for both Southern State and the University of Cincinnati- Clermont Campus credits. Several CCP classes are also taught on campus at the high school by several qualified teachers, with most of the AP classes doubling as CCP Credit through one of the two universities listed.

Students are also given the option to dually attend several of the Great Oaks Vocational Career Campuses, choosing to go to one of four available campuses.

== Extracurricular activities ==
Batavia students have a variety of clubs they can participate in, with many opportunities being presented in both the National Honor Society and Business Professionals of America (BPA) at Batavia. The National Honor Society participates in Leadership Conferences, such as the Anthony Munoz Youth Leadership Seminar, and around the school events. The NHS also funds a scholarship offered to Non-NHS members of the Batavia student body in honor of Alan Gordon.

The Batavia BPA sponsors fundraisers and organizes events. The BPA participates yearly in the Polar Plunge for Special Olympics, in the past being one of the top teams to raise money for the event.

The Interact Club at Batavia is sponsored by the Batavia Rotary. They participate within the community and actively do volunteer work.

The Batavia Student Council is also an active part of the student body, working with the Batavia Student Representatives to organize Prom, Homecoming, Spirit Weeks, and most recently, working with the BPA for the State Farm Celebrate My Drive, a national awards sweepstakes that Batavia High School has won twice; winning a $25,000 grant in the 2013–2014 school year, and then $100,000 in the 2014–2015 school year.

The Batavian, formerly known as The Echo, is the yearbook of Batavia High School. It is put together in cooperation with a teacher sponsor, students of all grades, and produced using Josten's software.

The Science Department at Batavia also participates in the Clermont County Science Challenge, and had a team place fourth, and by technicality, be able to proceed to the 2013–2014 Science Olympiad, and had a team place third and proceed to the Science Olympiad in the 2015–2016 school year.

Several Spanish class sponsored trips have been undertaken by Kevin Scheel at Batavia High School through EF Education First, having students journey to Costa Rica in the 2010–2011 school year, to Peru in the 2014–2015 school year, to Spain in the 2017–2018 school year, and to Europe in the 2021–2022 school year.

== Athletics ==
The Batavia Bulldogs sports teams participate in the Southern Buckeye Conference, offering the following sports teams:

- Batavia Men's Varsity Soccer
- Batavia Men's Jr. Varsity Soccer
- Batavia Girls' Varsity Soccer
- Batavia Girls' Jr. Varsity Soccer
- Batavia Girls' Tennis
- Batavia Men's Tennis
- Batavia Golf Team
- Batavia Football
- Batavia Girls' Volleyball
- Batavia Cross Country
- Batavia Academic Quiz Team
- Batavia Boys' Basketball
- Batavia Girls' Basketball
- Batavia Wrestling
- Batavia Softball
- Batavia Bulldog Baseball
- Batavia Swim Team

The high school campus is home to Holman Stadium, and the Stadium is used by the Football, Men's Soccer, Girls' Soccer. and Cross Country teams during their regular seasons. The high school houses one gymnasium, doubling as a performance space for the Music Department, although it is ill-equipped for such a job. The swim team uses the local YMCA's facilities. The campus also has vast practice fields, recently installing a fence for soccer practice fields, and also possesses baseball/softball diamonds.

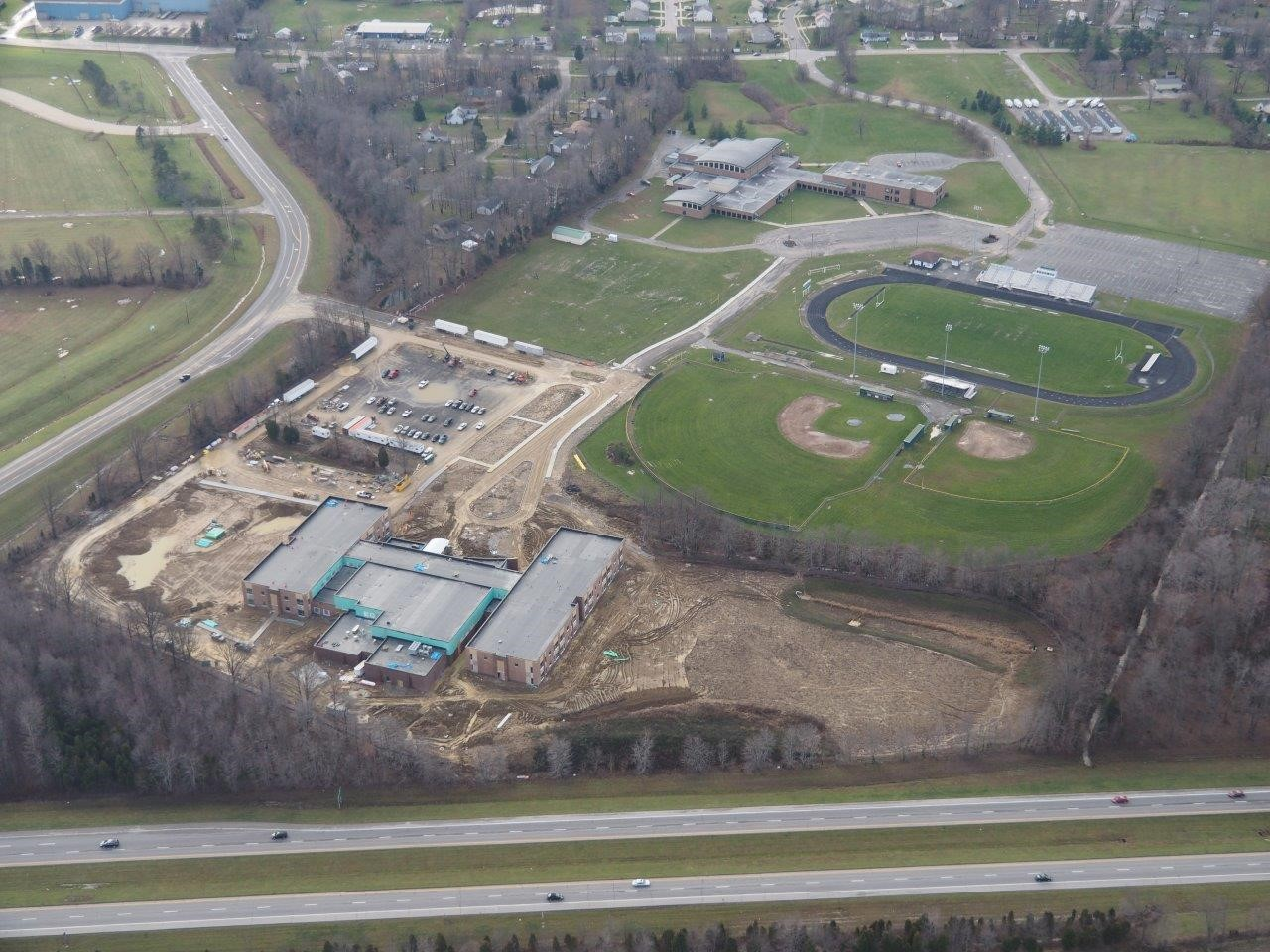
Aerial view of the high school campus, featuring the new Batavia Elementary school being built in 2015.

The campus originally had more space for training fields, however, in the year of 2015 construction began on the new Batavia Elementary School, moving from the village address of 215 Broadway, Batavia, OH and the old building to a newly built $22 million complex that is set to be completed by the fall of 2016.

The Batavia Bulldogs teams participated in the OHSAA Southwest Region athletic conferences since 1919, which was formed as the Clermont County League in 1919 and changed its name to the Southern Buckeye in 1987. The Bulldogs were part of the league from 1919–1985, and 1989 to present day. In the years of 1985–1989, Batavia Athletics were part of the Miami Valley Conference. As of the 2014–2015 school year, however, Batavia High School switched Divisions within the SBAAC, going from National to American.

Several individuals and Teams have made State Pride, with several state champions:

Individual

- Leroy Smith – 1949 state champion, 440 meter dash/track
- Lynn Beck – 1964 state champion, high jump/track
- Don Ogletree – 1964 and 1964 state champion, 440 meter dash/track
- Dave Smith – 1966 state champion, 100 yard dash/track
- Grady Reid, Jr. – 1971 state champion, 880 meter run/track, 1970 state runner-up, 880 meter run/track
- Terry Shinkle- 1991 and 1992 state runner-up, 125 lb. wrestling

Team

- Boys' Track – state runner-up
- Boys' Track – 1965 state runner-up
- Boys' Track – 1966 state champions

=== Athletic Hall of Fame ===
Batavia High School features an Athletic Hall of Fame, showcasing numerous athletes in the Main Hall of the High School who have achieved records and or fame with either the high school or later in life.

- Mel Hoderlein Class of 1942
- Herb Hoberg Class of 1933
- Grady Reid, Jr. Class of 1977
- Leroy Smith Class of 1949
- Chris Kent Class of 2000
- Terry Shinkle Class of 1992
- Chad Kelley Class of 2000
- Dave Miller Class of 1990
- Lynn Beck Class of 1964
- Kristine Dabbelt Class of 1999
- Larry Smith Class of 1987
- Eugene Johnson Class of 1980
- Amber Bishop Kelley Class of 2000
- Rick Crawford
- Robert Clousson Varsity Basketball and Track Coach
- Rhonda Murphy Class of 1989
- Scott Dotson Class of 1975
- Joel Gallimore Class of 1994
- Richard Dial Class of 1924
- Keith Crider Class of 1986
- Brent Bein Class of 1998
- Walt Carver Class of 1987
- Chris Kennedy Class of 1990
- George Knapp Athletic Director 1964-1989
- Dennis "Ike" Clepper Class of 1998
- Dave Smith Class of 1967
- Robert Hewitt Class of 1986
- Boys' Basketball Teams 1964, 1965, 1966
- Don Ogletree Class of 1966
- Rob Miller Class of 1983
- William Kennedy Class of 1987
- Sandy Woods Class of 1986

== Notable alumni ==
- Audrey Bolte, 2012 Miss Ohio winner (Class of 2007)
- Mel Hoderlein, former Major League Baseball player (Boston Red Sox, Washington Senators) (Class of 1942)
- Julius Penn, U.S. Army brigadier general in World War I (Class of 1881)

== OHSAA State Championships ==
- Boys Track and Field - 1966
