= Casstown Lutheran Stone Church =

Historic church in Casstown, Ohio, United States

- U.S. National Register of Historic Places
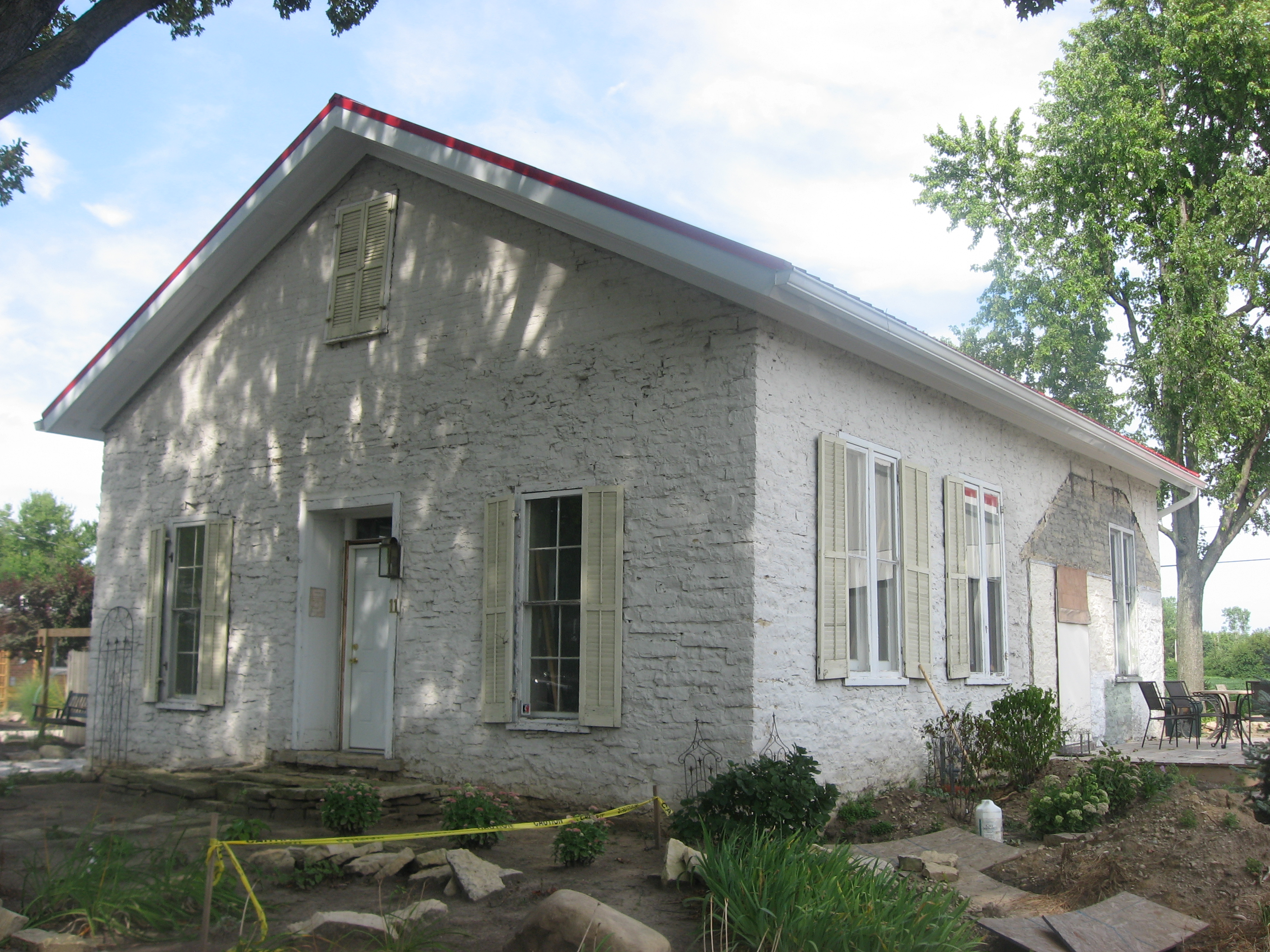
- Front and southern side

- Location within Ohio Location within the United States
- Location: 11 S. Main St., Casstown, Ohio
- Coordinates: 40°3′5″N 84°7′46″W
- Area: Less than 1 acre (0.40 ha)
- Built: 1839
- NRHP reference No.: 84003783
- Added to NRHP: May 31, 1984

The Casstown Lutheran Stone Church is a historic former church building in the village of Casstown, Ohio, United States. Built in the late 1830s, it was home to one of the region's earliest Lutheran congregations for just a short time before being converted for profane use. Its solid stone construction has made it architecturally important, and it has been named a historic site.

One story tall, the building is a simple stone structure with a basic gabled roofline; the sides are divided into four bays with windows, while the front has a central entrance with one window on each side. Unlike most other stone buildings, constructed of ashlar stone, the church in Casstown is built of rough, comparatively unworked stone. Its roof is of a rare form: the wooden beams supporting the roof form a fuller truss system than in many comparable buildings, and the complex system of pegs and mutually supporting beams enables the roof to stand without any interior load-bearing walls whatsoever.

Casstown's first Lutherans organized a church around 1835, just four years after the Evangelical Lutheran Joint Synod of Ohio was formed. Composed largely of emigrants from Pennsylvania, the congregation had no church building in its earliest years, so the members worshipped in that of the village's Methodist Episcopal congregation. Construction of the present building began in 1839, and upon its completion in the following year, the Lutherans left the Methodist building and occupied their own edifice. It remained their home for little more than a quarter century, as the congregation erected a larger brick building and moved to it in 1867. Following this time, it was converted into a residence, with two of its more prominent inhabitants being C.R. and Eunice Randall.

In 1984, the old church was listed on the National Register of Historic Places. It qualified for historic designation both because of its architecture and because of its place in the area's history, for it was considered to represent an important stage in the emigration of Pennsylvania Lutherans to western Ohio. One of more than forty National Register sites in Miami County, it is the only one in Casstown.
