= Hamilton Catholic High School =

Coordinates: 39°24′01″N 84°33′19″W

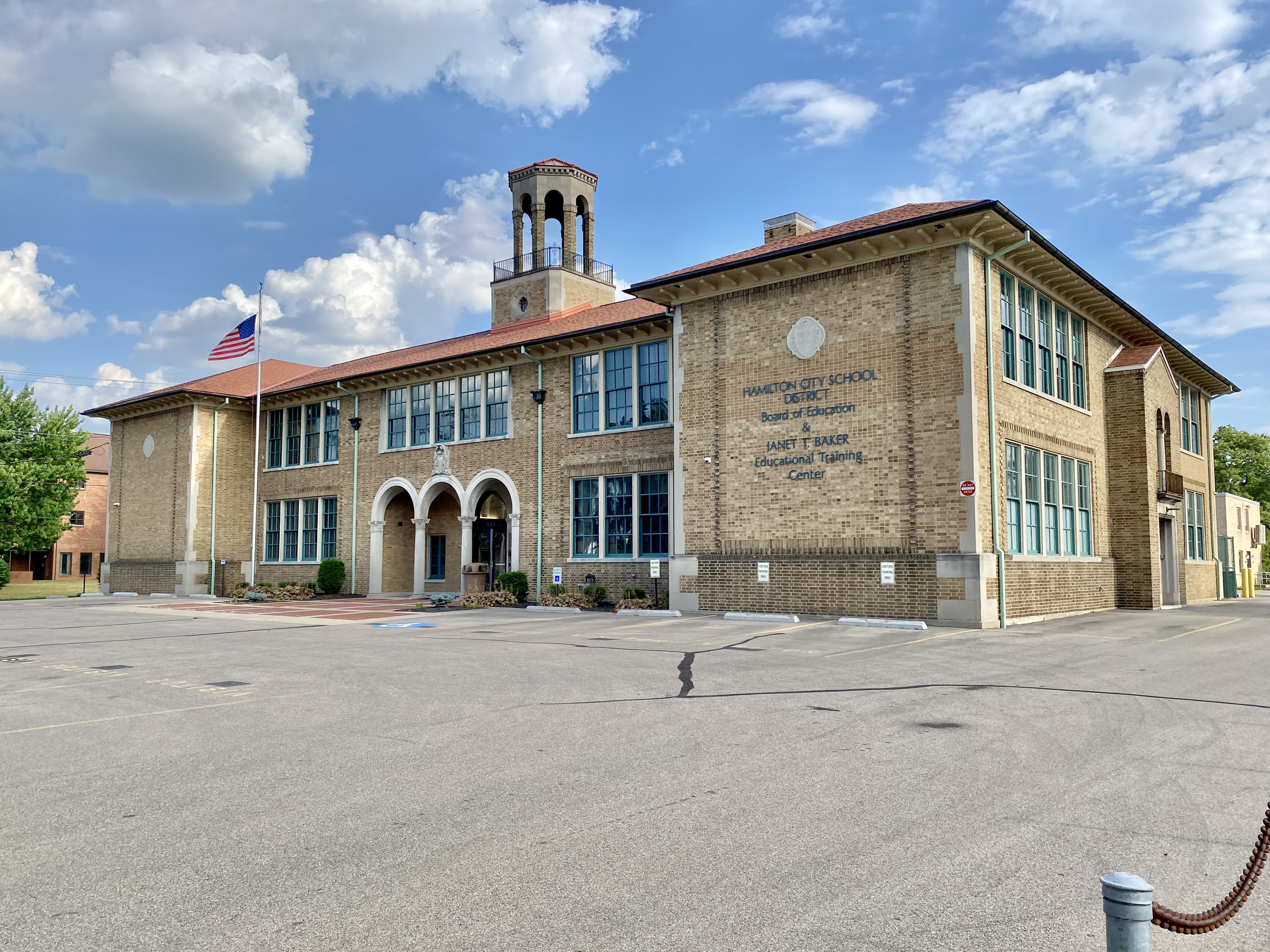
- Hamilton, Ohio

Information
- Type: Private, Coeducational
- Religious affiliation: Catholic
- Established: 1909
- Closed: 1966
- Grades: 9-12
- Athletics conference: Greater Cincinnati League (1949–1966)

Hamilton Catholic High School opened up in 1909 on Dayton Street in Hamilton, Ohio. The school originally served the young Catholic men of the area. The school closed in 1966, and its students were moved to the newly opened Father Stephen T. Badin High School. The former Hamilton Catholic High School building currently serves as the Hamilton Board of Education Office.

== Notable alumni ==
- Jim Holstein, former pro basketball player, head coach at Ball State University
- Kent Tekulve, former MLB pitcher (Pittsburgh Pirates, Philadelphia Phillies, Cincinnati Reds)

Navy Veteran Earl A. Rust Jr,

== See also ==
- Notre Dame High School
