= Archbishop Carroll High School (Dayton, Ohio) =

Catholic high school in Ohio, US

Location
- 4524 Linden Avenue; Dayton, Ohio 45432; United States; 39°44′31″N 84°06′47″W

Information
- Type: Parochial secondary school
- Motto: It’s a Great Day to be a Patriot!
- Religious affiliation: Catholic Church
- Opened: 1961
- Authority: Roman Catholic Archdiocese of Cincinnati
- Principal: Matthew Sableski
- Grades: 9-12
- Enrollment: 693 (2025)
- Colors: Red, white & blue
- Athletics conference: Greater Catholic League
- Website: www.carrollhs.org

Archbishop Carroll High School is a Catholic high school located in Dayton, Ohio, United States. It is run by the Roman Catholic Archdiocese of Cincinnati. Archbishop Carroll High School is recognized as the full, official name of the school on July 1, 2022.

== History ==
Archbishop Carroll High School is named for John Carroll (1735–1815), the first bishop and subsequently the first archbishop of the United States. The school opened its doors to students on August 18, 1961. Carroll's first class graduated May 31, 1965.

== Athletics ==
Carroll's mascot is the Patriot. The Carroll Patriots teams compete in the Greater Catholic League. Carroll's school colors are red, white, and blue.

Ohio High School Athletic Association State Championships:

- Boys Soccer– 1980, 2008, 2010, 2011, 2012

== Notable alumni ==
- Steve Austria – United States House of Representatives, Ohio's 7th congressional district
