= St. Rita School for the Deaf =

Private school in Evendale, Ohio, U.S.

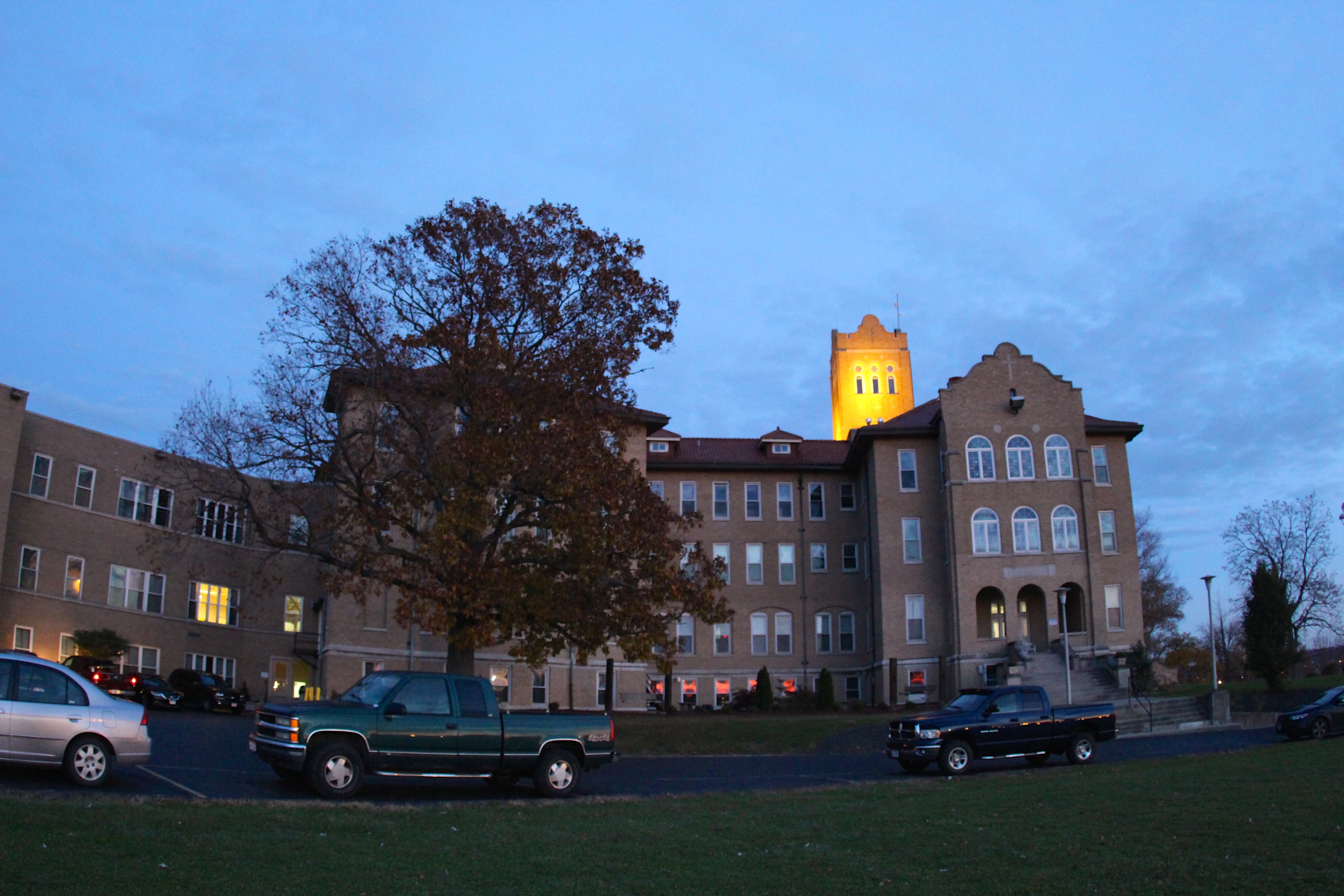

Location
- 1720 Glendale Milford Road; Cincinnati, (Hamilton County), Ohio 45215; United States; 39°15′10″N 84°26′54″W

Information
- Type: Private, Coeducational
- Motto: Teaching communication for life
- Religious affiliation: Catholic
- Established: 1915
- Executive Director: Angela Frith
- Chaplain: Rev. Wysong
- Faculty: 99
- Grades: PK–12
- Campus size: 237 acres (0.96 km^{2})
- Colors: Green and Gold
- Slogan: Dream, Achieve, Soar
- Athletics: none
- Mascot: Lions
- Nickname: Lions
- Website: http://www.srsdeaf.org

St. Rita School for the Deaf is an independent Roman Catholic school located in the village of Evendale, near Cincinnati, Ohio.

== History ==
Challenged by Archbishop Henry Moeller, Father Henry J. Waldhaus, with the help of the Knights of De l'Epee and the Saints Mary and Joseph Society, was able to raise the funds necessary to purchase the land for St. Rita School. The school opened in 1915 and became the first accredited high school for the deaf in Ohio. In 2016, Sr. Marianne Van Vurst SC was named as interim Executive Director of the school.

== Approach and languages used ==
Currently, their philosophy is "comprehensive communication"—essentially Total Communication with a different name. The school's deaf and hearing teachers use ASL as a method of instruction, but the majority use is Simultaneous Communication.

== Academics and programs ==
While based in the Catholic Archdiocese of Cincinnati, St. Rita School works to meet the needs of Deaf and hard of hearing and students with special communication needs. Students come from all over Cincinnati in addition to students from northern Kentucky and other parts of Ohio.

St. Rita's is one of the first schools in the country to develop a program for dyspraxic children, sometimes referred to as "global" apraxia. The program teaches to the students communication disabilities (oral-buccofacial apraxia) and encompasses each student's global dyspraxic apraxia disabilities that affect the student's fine and gross motor skills with their motor planning; sequencing and motor- processing abilities (which include but is not limited to ideomotor, ideation, limb-kinetic and ocular motor apraxias).

The school's Montessori pre-school program is designed to meet the development needs of hearing and deaf children, starting at 3 years of age. The school also features an elementary, high school, and Career Plus programs.

=== Athletics ===
St. Rita's competes with area schools in basketball and volleyball. In 1962, the high school division petitioned the Greater Catholic League to compete in football at the reserve level. Later, the high school became a member of the Girls Greater Cincinnati League. Due to small class sizes, in 2017/2018 the school switched to intramural sports and did not compete competitively.

== Fundraising ==
Like many Greater Cincinnati Catholic parishes, major funding comes from annual festivals. The St. Rita Fest began in 1916 but stopped in 2016 It was one of the area's largest. The school still holds a Grand Raffle and a scholarship benefit dinner.
