= South High School (Springfield, Ohio) =

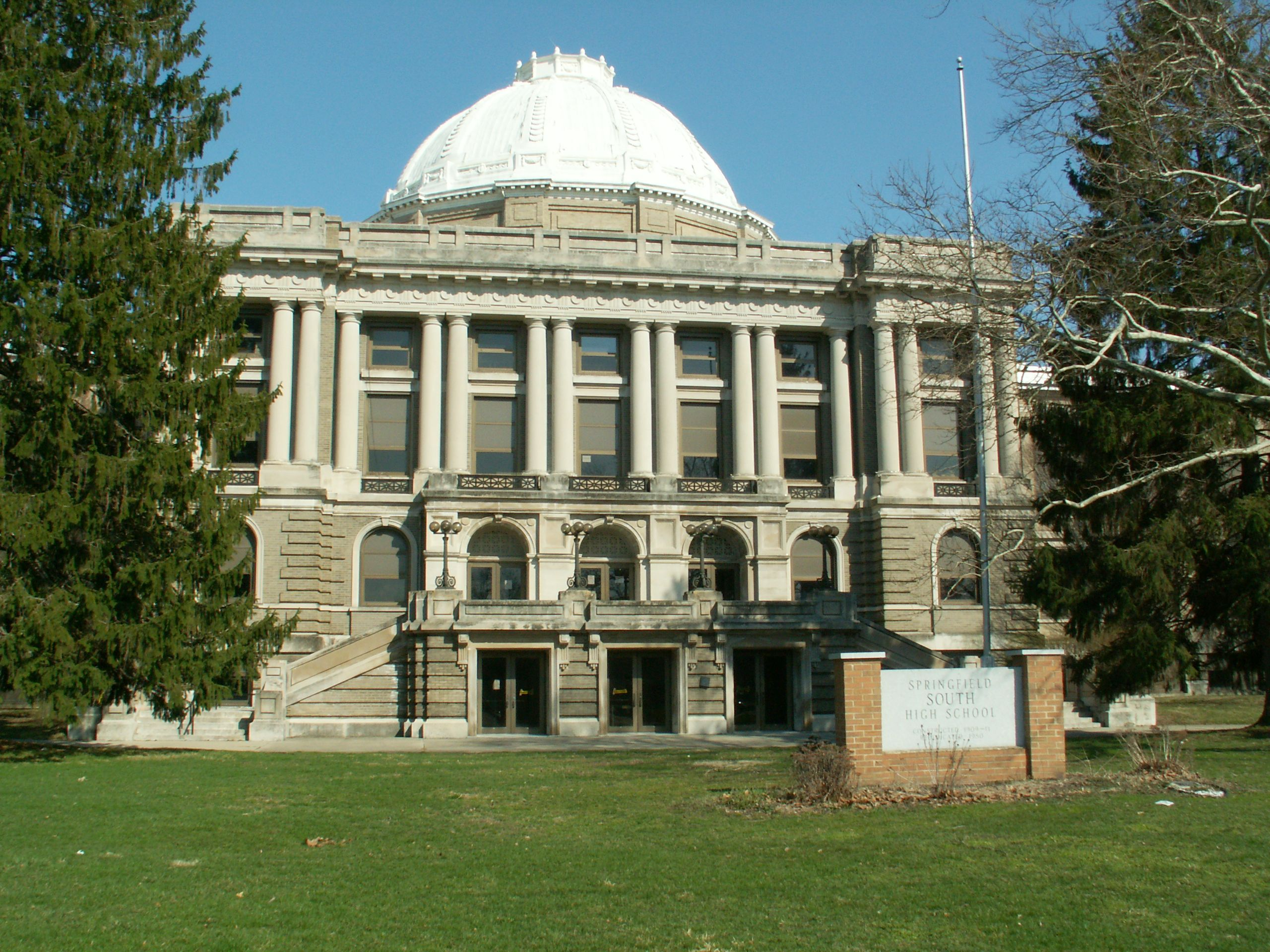

Location
- 700 South Limestone Street; Springfield, Ohio 45503; United States
- Coordinates: 39°54′59″N 83°48′31″W

Information
- Type: Public
- Established: 1960
- Closed: 2008
- School district: Springfield City School District
- Colors: Blue and gold
- Team name: Wildcats

South High School was a public high school in Springfield, Ohio. It was one of two high schools in the Springfield City School District (SCSD), the other school being North High School. The school was created in 1960 when the original Springfield High School was divided into North and South High Schools. South was housed in the original Springfield High School, built in 1911, and assumed the SHS school colors of blue and gold and the athletic team name Wildcats. The building was designed by Albert Pretzinger of Dayton and modeled after the Library of Congress.

South was closed in 2008 when enrollment declines in the Springfield City School District necessitated consolidating the two high schools and re-establishing Springfield High School. The new Springfield High School was built at what had been the North High School campus and the North High School building was demolished. Thanks to a large state grant, local donations, and the school district's investment, the former South High School building reopened in 2015 as the Springfield Center of Innovation: The Dome. It is still owned and operated by the Springfield City School District. SCSD operates the CareerConnectED Center and John Legend Theater within the building, and leases space in the Dome to the Global Impact STEM Academy and to Clark State Community College.

== Athletics ==
- Springfield South and North had a cross-town rivalry. In basketball, North won 21 of the final 25 meetings between the schools.
- The 2002-03 South football team reached the state semifinals.
- The Dayton Rens would play in the South High School's Gymnasium back when it was originally a part of the original Springfield High School at the time of the 1948–49 NBL season (the final season of the National Basketball League, as well as their only season of play as a franchise here) after taking over a spot originally held by the Detroit Vagabond Kings earlier that season.

== Notable people ==
- Fred Foster; professional basketball player in the National Basketball Association (NBA)
- Alaina Reed Hall, actress, starring on the television series Sesame Street and 227
