= North High School (Springfield, Ohio) =

Location
- 701 East Home Road; Springfield, Ohio 45503; United States; 39°56′54″N 83°47′49″W

Information
- Type: Public
- Established: 1960
- Closed: 2008
- School district: Springfield City School District
- Colors: Scarlet, navy blue, and white
- Team name: Panthers

North High School was a public high school in Springfield, Ohio, that opened in 1960. It was one of two high schools in the Springfield City School District, the other school being South High School. On September 8, 2008, the two schools were combined into Springfield High School. The North High School building was demolished on May 30, 2008, to make way for the new Springfield High School building.

North's mascot was the panther and the school colors were scarlet and navy on white.

== State championships ==
- Girls Basketball – 1977

== Notable alumni ==
- Randy Ayers, assistant professional basketball coach, Phoenix Suns
- Marsha Dietlein Bennett, actress
- Justin Chambers, model and actor, Grey's Anatomy
- Griffin House, musician, singer, and songwriter
- Jimmy Journell, former professional baseball player, St. Louis Cardinals
- John Legend, Grammy and Academy award-winning musician
- Will McEnaney, former professional baseball player, Cincinnati Reds, Montreal Expos, Pittsburgh Pirates, and St. Louis Cardinals
- Rob Rue, mayor of Springfield, Ohio
