= Father Stephen T. Badin High School =

Catholic high school in Ohio

Stephen T. Badin High School

Location
- 571 New London Road; Hamilton, Ohio, (Butler County) 45013; United States; 39°23′43″N 84°35′32″W

Information
- School type: Private, co-ed
- Religious affiliation: Catholic
- Denomination: Catholic
- Established: 1966
- NCES School ID: 01895214
- Dean: Patty Gibbons
- Principal: Patrick Keating
- Chaplain: Father Ed Pratt
- Staff: 34
- Teaching staff: 52.6 (FTE)
- Grades: 9–12
- Enrollment: 608 (2021–2022)
- Student to teacher ratio: 11.6
- Hours in school day: 7:30-2:30 PM
- Colors: Green and white
- Slogan: Serving God, Serving Others
- Athletics conference: Greater Catholic League Co-Ed
- Mascot: Rams
- Nickname: Badin Rams
- Team name: The Rams
- Accreditation: North Central Association of Colleges and Schools
- Newspaper: Badin Blast
- Tuition: $12,560 (2024-2025) Plus Fees
- Affiliation: Sisters of Notre Dame de Namur
- Website: www.badinhs.org

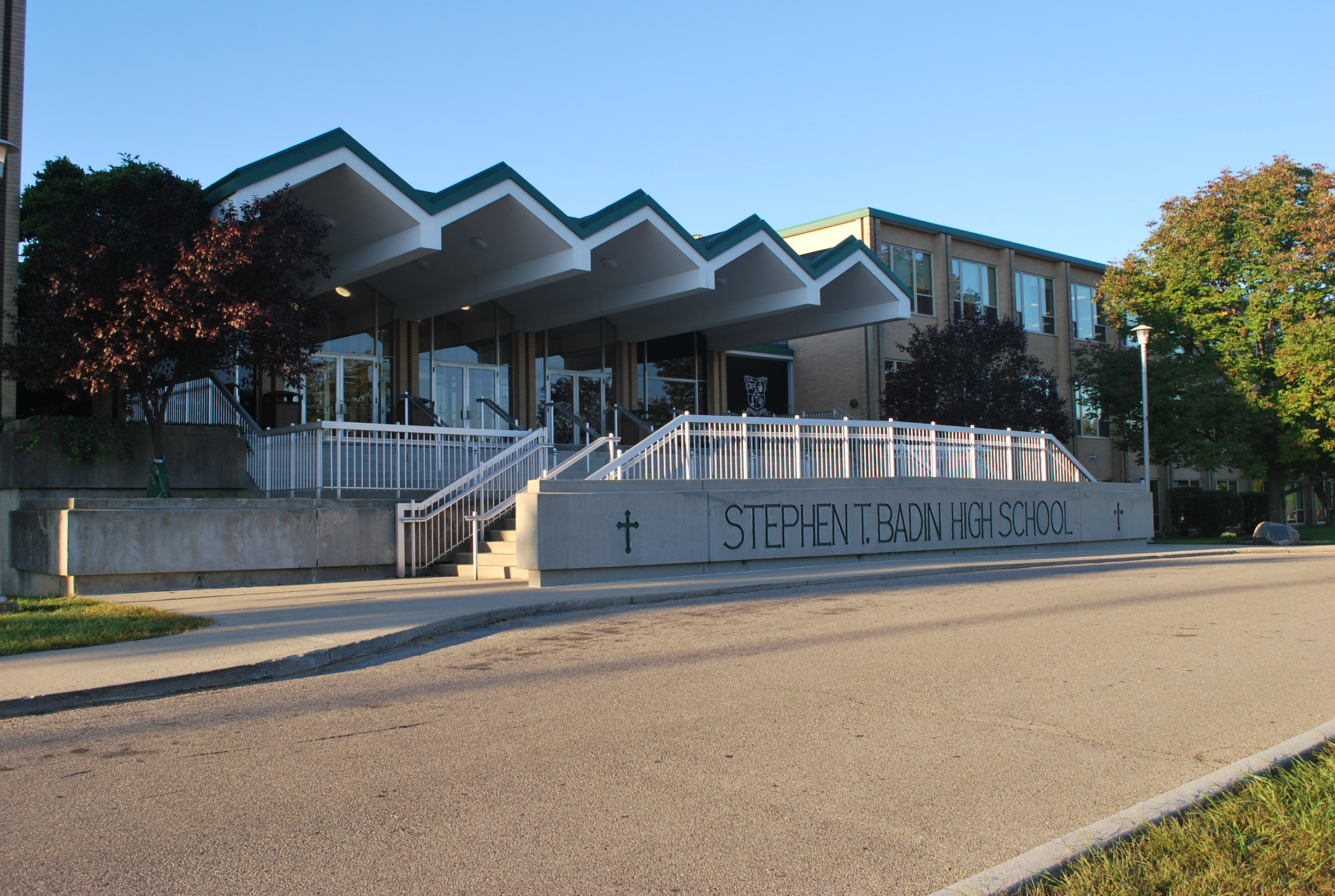
Stephen T. Badin High School, founded 1966

Stephen T. Badin High School, (commonly known as Badin High School) is a Catholic high school of the Archdiocese of Cincinnati school system, serving grades nine through twelve in Hamilton, Ohio, United States. It is a comprehensive high school which admits students of all levels of ability.

== History ==
Badin High School is named after Father Stephen T. Badin, the first Catholic priest ordained in the United States. Badin High School first opened its doors the fall of 1966. Previously, two high schools served the area from the early 1900s until their closings in 1966: Hamilton Catholic High School for young men and Notre Dame High School for young women. The Sisters of Notre Dame de Namur, the Brothers of St. Mary, archdiocesan priests, other religious orders and committed lay persons laid the foundation of Badin High school at its current location near Potter's golf course on New London Road. Father Frank Miller (Purcell '42) organized the merger and became the first principal of the combined school.

== Notable alumni ==
- Malia Berkely — professional soccer player currently with the North Carolina Courage
- Spencer Giesting – professional baseball player in the Arizona Diamondbacks organization

== Athletics ==
The teams from Badin are known as the Rams. Student athletes compete in the GCL Co-Ed Division through the Archdiocese of Cincinnati.

=== State championships ===
The Rams have won a total of 8 combined OHSAA team state titles in boys and girls sports.

- Girls basketball – 1998
- Girls soccer – 2005, 2013, 2014
- Baseball – 1991, 1996, 2026
- Football – 1990
- Boys basketball – 1988

=== Non-OHSAA sanctioned state championships ===
- Boys volleyball - 2022
- Girls flag football - 2025

== See also ==
- St. Peter in Chains School
