= Catholic Central School (Springfield, Ohio) =

School in Springfield, Ohio, United States

Location
- 1200 East High Street; Springfield, (Clark County), Ohio 45505; United States; 39°55′19″N 83°47′29″W

Information
- Denomination: Roman Catholic
- School district: Roman Catholic Archdiocese of Cincinnati
- President: Mike Raiff
- Principals: Katherine Anderson(pre-K–12)

Catholic Central School is a private, Roman Catholic school in Springfield, Ohio. Part of the Archdiocese of Cincinnati, Catholic Central provides education for grades PreK-12 at two campuses. It was recentlyranked #938 Best Catholic High School in America. The school's sports teams are known as the Fighting Irish.

They have multiple specials for K-8 which includes Music, P.E, Art, and Spanish.

== History ==
Catholic Central High School opened in 1929, as a unified name given to all the local parish high schools in the Springfield area. These three schools merged in 1932, moving operations over to the high school located at St. Raphael's Church in downtown Springfield. However, as the site began to become too crowded, the need for a larger campus became evident, and the school eventually moved again to a new building built down the street from the St. Raphael campus. Operations would move to this site, located at 1200 E. High Street in the fall of 1958.

Kindergarten through 8th grade classes were taught independently of Catholic Central at the local parish sites. These included St. Joseph, St. Raphael, St. Mary (Springfield), St. Mary (Urbana), St. Teresa, and St. Bernard. However, in 1980, the economy forced the merger of the St. Joseph, St. Raphael and St. Mary (Springfield) feeder elementary school sites into one school: Holy Trinity. All of the Parish Catholic Elementary Schools subsequently closed and in 2004 all of the parish schools were consolidated into Catholic Central Schools with grades 7–12 on the High Street Campus and grades K-6 housed at the Lagonda and Limestone campuses. As financial conditions continued to plague the Catholic education system in the community, the schools eventually decided to unite into one single school: Catholic Central. In 2004, grades 7 and 8 were moved to the high school's East High Street campus, thus renamed Catholic Central Jr./Sr. High School, while the elementary school sites at St. Bernard Church and St. Teresa Church continued to remain open under the name Catholic Central Elementary School - Lagonda or Limestone campus, respectively. This consolidation, made complete in 2005, marked the first whole unification of the Catholic schools in Springfield. In 2011, a restructuring of grade levels was enacted, and the Lagonda campus began to teach students in grades 4–6, while the Limestone campus taught students in grades PreK-3.

The Catholic Central Board of Trustees moved to adopt the Principal-CEO model of governance in 2013. Under this model, Catholic Central consolidated its three campuses – closing the Lagonda campus and building a new high school addition at the East High Street campus. With this consolidation, the Limestone campus now houses PreK – 2. Grades 3 – 12 are now all located at the East High Street campus.

== Academics ==
For graduation from Catholic Central High School, students are required to have accumulated 4 credits in religion and language arts, 3 credits in math, science and social studies, and 1 credit in art and foreign languages. Students are taught basic courses in the fields. AP courses are available on-campus as an option for advanced students, as well as a dual-credit 100-level religion course from University of Dayton. Students also have the availability to take classes off-campus for dual-credit through PSEO at Clark State Community College and Wittenberg University. In addition, students can work to receive a diploma from Catholic Central, while learning a specific trade and taking classes at the local Springfield-Clark Career Technology Center.

Various elective classes are also offered on-campus to the high school students throughout the year, including courses in the study of music, business, art, etc.

Academics for grades pre-K through 8 are structured through requirements from the Archdiocese of Cincinnati. While teaching usual grade-school content, students also take a religion course each year and teachers are instructed to inject Christian morality and teachings into their everyday lessons.

=== Winter Term ===
During the month of January, Catholic Central breaks the month down into a whole, single semester called January Term, or, "J-Term." Students participate in two classes during the semester, both meeting each weekday of the month for three hours, as opposed to the normal fifty minutes. The courses offered (including Comparative Anatomy and Physiology: Dissection and Service Ministry, etc.) are not available to be taken during the rest of the year. Freshman students are required to take physical education and health courses as a means to fulfill the graduation requirement. Sophomore students also take physical education, and may choose to take either an Ohio Graduation Test preparation course or an elective. Junior and senior students are able to complete any class they wish, assuming they have completed their gym and health credits. Upperclassmen students also have the opportunity to complete an independent study and seniors may go on a class trip to Ireland.

Grades pre-K through 8 do not participate in "J-Term."

The term has been nationally recognized. In 2005, the semester term lead to Catholic Central being ranked as one of the "Top 50 Catholic Schools in the Nation".

== Campus ==
The school is at 1200 E. High Street in Springfield, Ohio. Students from grades k-12 attend classes at the Catholic Central School campus. Preschool classes are taught at the Catholic Central Limestone campus also located in Springfield.

=== Consolidation ===
As of 2004, the seventh and eighth grade classes are taught at the main high school classes. The feeder school sites were renamed to Catholic Central Elementary in 2005. As the consolidation was considered successful by Catholic Central and the Archdiocese of Cincinnati, plans began to circulate about Catholic Central potentially finding one location to teach all grades Pre-K through 12. While a fund would have made the purchase of the former site of Springfield South High School available for Catholic Central, they eventually declined the offer. In 2012, however, school officials issued the public announcement of a capital campaign with a long-term vision of the complete consolidation onto the East High Street campus. The first phase of the project includes a $5 – $6 million investment which would bring more students to the main campus while at the same time reducing the number of sites from three to two.

Completed in August 2014, Phase 1 of the project included the construction of a new addition on the East High site, on the rear and side of the existing high school building. The high school students will take classes in the new addition, while grades 3 - 8 will attend school in the original high school portion of the building. Grades pre-K - 2 are housed at the St. Teresa parish school site/Catholic Central Limestone campus. Phase 2, the new multi-story chapel and elementary school offices addition on the front of the original building was completed in March 2015 with formal dedication by the Archbishop of Cincinnati in April of that year.

== Athletics ==
Since 2001, Catholic Central High School's athletic teams have participated in the Ohio Heritage Conference (OHC).

Students can participate in the following sports:

- Fall: Cheerleading, Boys'/Girls' Cross Country, Football, Girls' Tennis, Boys'/ Girls' Golf, Boys'/Girls' Soccer, and Volleyball
- Winter: Cheerleading, Boys'/Girls' Basketball, and Boys'/Girls' Swimming, Bowling, and Wrestling
- Spring: Baseball, Softball, Boys' Tennis, and Track

Elementary students can compete against other schools in a variety of sports through CYO ("Catholic Youth Organization"). Junior high students also have the ability to play many of the same sports as the high school against other local junior highs.

=== Ohio High School Athletic Association State Championships ===
Catholic Central High School has won the state championship in the following sports:

- Boys Basketball – 1996
- Boys Soccer - 2001, 2007

== Notable alumni ==
- Jason Collier, professional basketball player
- Jim Paxson, Sr., professional basketball player

=== Hall of Honor ===
In 2008, Catholic Central inducted the first class into its "Hall of Honor," which was established to recognize the school's distinguished alumni. There are two categories of inductees: the "Distinguished Hall of Honor" is for alumni who have made significant contributions to their professions and the school, while being active in their community; the "Athletic Hall of Honor" recognizes alumni who have made significant contributions to the school's athletic program. According to the school, inductees stand as representatives of the school's "Legacy of Leadership."

== Notes and references ==
https://goxavier.com/news/2015/9/26/MSOC_0926152808.aspx
