= Cincinnati Christian Schools =

Private school in Fairfield, Ohio, United States

Location
- 7474 Morris Rd. Administrative Office; Fairfield, Ohio, (Butler County) 45011; United States

Information
- Type: Private, Christian
- Motto: Believe, Belong, Become
- Religious affiliations: Christian, non-denominational
- Superintendent: Raymond C. Kochis
- Principal: Jennifer Fluegge, Elementary Campus & Kim Stone, JH/SH Campus
- Chaplain: Caleb Snyder
- Grades: PK-12
- Average class size: 16 students
- Colors: Royal Blue and White
- Athletics: Cross Country, Golf, Soccer, Volleyball, Basketball, Bowling, Swim, Baseball, Softball, and Track & Tield
- Athletics conference: Miami Valley Conference
- Mascot: Cougar
- Team name: Cougars
- Rival: Cincinnati Hills Christian Academy
- Accreditation: North Central Association of Colleges and Schools
- Elementary Campus: 7350 Dixie Hwy; Fairfield, OH 45014
- JH/SH Campus: 7474 Morris Road, Fairfield, OH 45011
- Website: cincinnatichristian.org

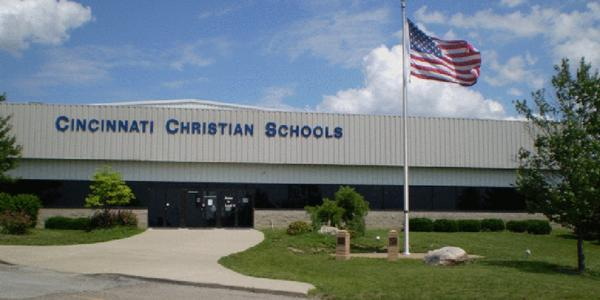
Picture of the front of the Junior/Senior high school building of Cincinnati Christian Schools.

Cincinnati Christian Schools is a private Christian school near Fairfield, Ohio.

Cincinnati Christian Schools is a private, PK-Grade 12, non-denominational Christian school located in Fairfield, Ohio. The Elementary Campus is on State Route 4 just north of I-275 and serves PK-Grade 6. The JH/SH Campus is on Morris Road near the intersection of State Route 4 Bypass and State Route 129 and serves Grades 7-12.

== Background ==
Greater Cincinnati Christian High School was established in 1971 at the Springdale Baptist Church. The same year, Tri-County Christian Elementary School opened for grades kindergarten through third, operated by Tri-County Assembly Church of God. In 1973, Tri-County added fourth through sixth grades. In 1975 Tri-County assumed control of Greater Cincinnati Christian, forming a kindergarten through twelfth grade educational system.

In 1993, the schools separated financially and operationally from the Tri-County Assembly Church of God and became Cincinnati Christian Schools. The schools are now operated by a non-denominational board of directors.

Brief Historical Timeline

1971—Greater Cincinnati Christian High School began (Grades 7—11; added Grade 12 in 1972; utilized the facilities of Springdale Baptist Church)

1971—Tri-County Christian Elementary School began (Grades K—3; added Grades 4—6 in 1973; utilized the facilities of TCA)

1975—Greater Cincinnati Christian High School and Tri-County Christian Elementary School merged; operated by TCA under the name Tri-County Christian Schools

1993—Tri-County Christian Schools became independent from TCA and was incorporated as Cincinnati Christian Schools, Inc.

2002—Grades K—5 remained at the facilities of TCA; Grades 6—12 moved to the newly acquired campus of the Courts of Praise Christian Center

2007—An early education (preschool) program was added at the Elementary Campus
