= Blanchester Local Schools =

School district in Ohio

Location
- Southwestern Ohio United States
- Coordinates: 39°17′32″N 83°59′9″W

District information
- Type: Public school district
- Motto: Home of the Wildcats
- Grades: K to 12
- School board: Blanchester Board of Education
- NCES District ID: 3904638

Students and staff
- Enrollment: 1,307 (2020-2021)
- Faculty: 74.80 (on FTE basis)
- Student–teacher ratio: 17.47

Other information
- Other name: Blanchester Local School District
- Website: www.blanschools.org

Blanchester Local Schools is a public school district in southwestern Ohio. The district serves approximately 1,850 students from Brown, Clermont, Clinton and Warren Counties.

== Schools ==
In 2002, the district opened a new high school and elementary school. Extensive renovations were done to the existing Junior and Senior High schools, turning them into the Intermediate and Middle schools. At that same time Jefferson Elementary and Main Street Middle School were closed.

School	Grades
Putman Elementary School	PK–3
Blanchester Intermediate School	4–5
Blanchester Middle School	6–8
Blanchester High School	9–12
