= Williamsburg High School (Ohio) =

Public high school in Williamsburg, Ohio, US

Location
- 500 South 5th Street; Williamsburg, (Clermont County), Ohio 45176; United States
- Coordinates: 39°3′6″N 84°3′57″W

Information
- Type: Public, Coeducational high school
- Superintendent: Matt Earley
- Principal: Jason Tackett
- Grades: 6-12
- Colors: Blue and White
- Athletics conference: Southern Buckeye Athletic/Academic Conference
- Team name: Wildcats
- Website: www.burgschools.org/o/mshs

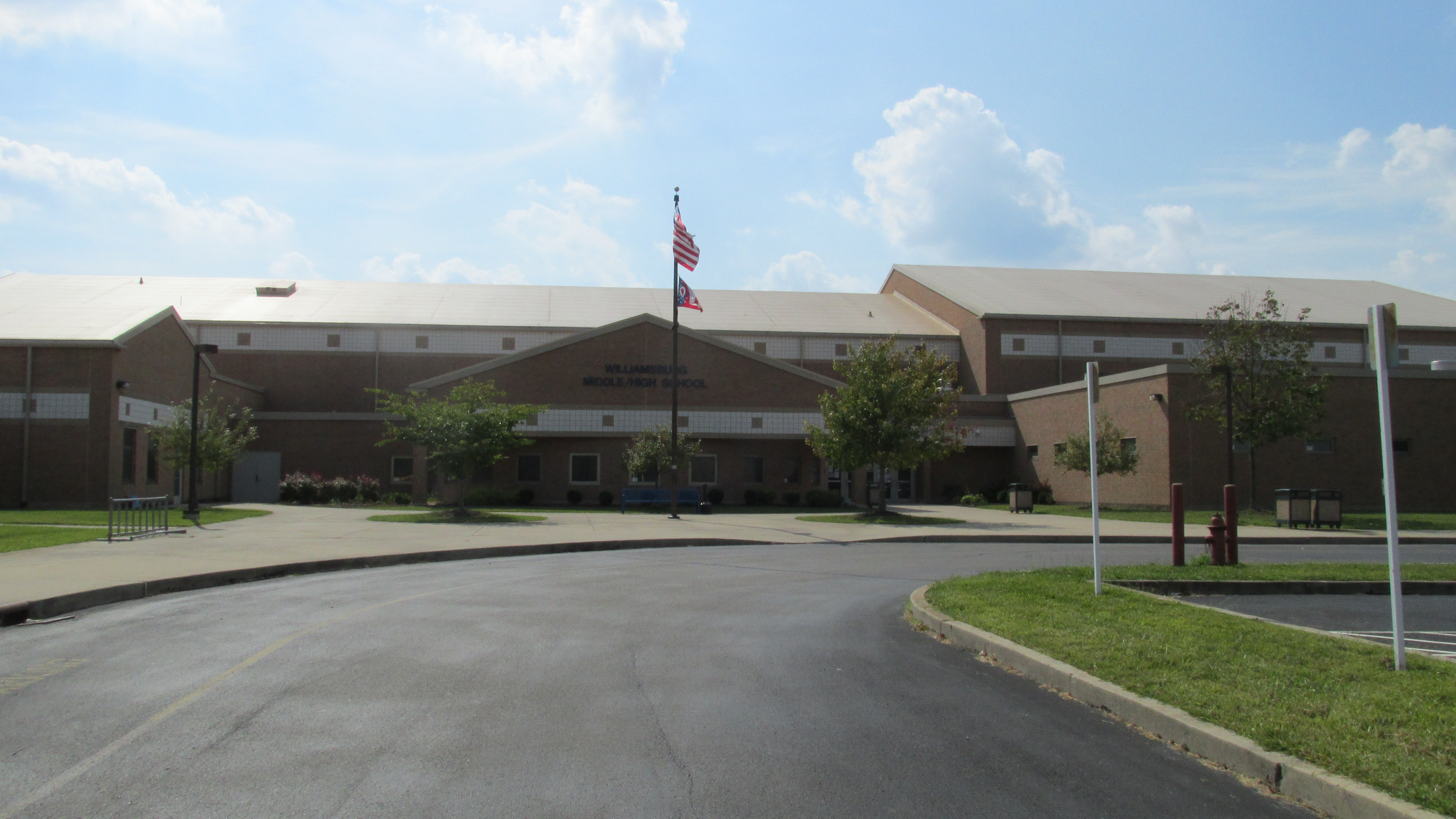
Williamsburg High School

Williamsburg High School is a public high school in Williamsburg, Ohio. It is the only high school in the Williamsburg Local School District. It serves around 600 students in the Middle and High Schools. There was a new building built in 1996 and still runs today.

== Athletics ==
=== Ohio High School Athletic Association State Championships ===
- Girls Softball – 2017
