= Springfield City School District =

School district in Ohio, United States

Address
- 700 S Limestone Street Springfield, Ohio, 45505; United States

District information
- Type: Public
- Grades: PK–12
- NCES District ID: 3904481

Students and staff
- Students: 7,099 (2022–2023)
- Teachers: 444.7 (on an FTE basis)
- Staff: 807 (on an FTE basis)
- Student–teacher ratio: 15.96:1

Other information
- Website: www.scsdoh.org

Springfield City School District is the public school district that serves the majority of the city of Springfield, Ohio, United States. It operates 14 schools: ten elementary, three middle, and one high. The superintendent is Robert Hill.

== Schools ==
=== Elementary schools ===
- Fulton Elementary School
- Horace Mann Elementary School
- Kenton Elementary School
- Kenwood Elementary School
- Lagonda Elementary School
- Lincoln Elementary School
- Perrin Woods Elementary School
- Snowhill Elementary School
- Snyder Park Elementary School
- Warder Park/Wayne Elementary School

=== Middle schools ===
- Hayward Middle School
- Roosevelt Middle School
- Schaefer Middle School

=== High school ===
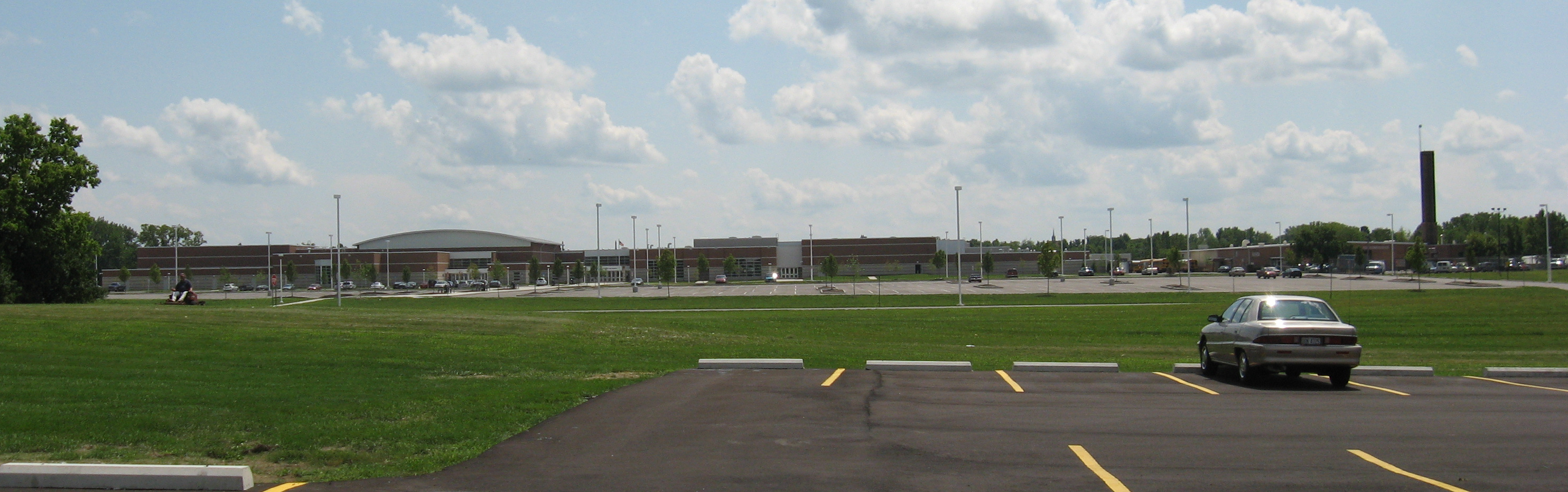
Springfield High School

- Springfield High School

=== Alternative schools ===
- Keifer Alternative School

=== Former schools ===
- Franklin Middle School, closed 2004
- North High School, closed 2008
- South High School, closed 2008
- Clark Middle School (Springfield, Ohio), closed 2009
