= Ohio Southwest Region defunct athletic conferences =

This is a list of former high school athletic conferences in the Southwest Region of Ohio, as designated by the Ohio High School Athletic Association. If a conference had members that span multiple regions, the conference is placed in the article of the region most of its former members hail from. Because the names of localities and their corresponding high schools do not always match and because there is often a possibility of ambiguity with respect to either the name of a locality or the name of a high school, the following table gives both in every case, with the locality name first, in plain type, and the high school name second in boldface type. The school's team nickname is given last.

== Brown County League ==
The BCL was one of the local small-school county leagues in Southwest Ohio. Consolidation reduced the number of teams to five by 1967, and in 1970 these five joined with the Adams and Highland county leagues to form the Southern Hills Athletic League.

- **Aberdeen** Pirates (1930s–53, consolidated into Ripley-Union-Lewis-Huntington)
- **Decatur** Bulldogs (1930s–62, consolidated into Eastern Brown)
- **Fayetteville-Perry** Rockets (1930s–70, to Southern Hills)
- **Georgetown** G-Men (1930s–70, to Southern Hills)
- **Hamersville** Hornets (1930s–67, consolidated into Western Brown)
- **Higginsport** Wildcats (1930s–53, consolidated into Ripley-Union-Lewis-Huntington)
- **Mount Orab** Mounties (1930s–67, consolidated into Western Brown)
- **Ripley-Union-Lewis-Huntington** Bluejays (1930s–70, Ripley before 1953, to Southern Hills)
- **Russellville** Ramblers (1930s–62, consolidated into Eastern Brown)
- **Sardinia** Zephyrs (1930s–62, consolidated into Eastern Brown)
- Sardinia **Eastern Brown** Warriors (1962–70, to Southern Hills)
- Mount Orab **Western Brown** Broncos (1967–70, to Southern Hills)

== Butler County League ==
- **Fairfield** Indians (<1925-53, to Mid-Miami League)^{1}
- Darrtown **Hanover** Eagles (<1925-56, consolidated into Talawanda)
- Monroe **Lemon-Monroe** Hornets (<1925-51, to Little 6 League and Mid-Miami League)^{2}
- Wetherington **Liberty** Lions (<1925-59, consolidated into Liberty-Union)
- Oxford **McGuffey** Green Wave (<1925-56, consolidated into Talawanda)
- Okeana **Morgan Township** Mustangs (<1925-53, Okeana before 1942, consolidated into Ross)
- **Reily** Bluebirds (<1925-65, to Southwestern Ohio Conference)
- **Ross** Rams (<1925-65, to SWOL)^{3, 4}
- **Seven Mile** Panthers (<1925-65, to SOC)^{3, 4}
- **Shandon** Spartans (<1925-42, consolidated into Morgan Township)
- **Somerville** Eagles (<1925-44, consolidated into Stewart)
- Oxford **Stewart** Tigers (<1925-56, consolidated into Talawanda)
- **Trenton** Trojans (<1925-65, to SOC)
- West Chester **Liberty-Union** Thunderbirds (<1925-59, Union before 1959, to SOC)
- Jacksonburg **Wayne** Warriors (<1925-58, consolidated into Seven Mile)
- **New Miami** Vikings (1954–65, to SOC)^{5}
- Oxford **Talawanda** Braves (1956–59, to SOC)^{3}
1. Concurrent with MML 1951-53.
2. Concurrent with Little 6 League 1939-51.
3. Concurrent with Little Southwestern League 1956-59.
4. Concurrent with Southwestern Ohio Conference 1959-65.
5. Concurrent with SOC 1960-65.

== Cincinnati Public League/Interscholastic Athletic Association of Cincinnati ==
The Interscholastic Athletic Association was founded March 23, 1896, and continued for several years with both public and private high schools until 1931, when it rebranded itself as the Public High School League. Now encompassing solely the public high schools in Cincinnati, the league lasted until 1985, when reshuffling of city and suburban Cincinnati high schools took place, which led to the formation of the Cincinnati Hills League, Eastern Metro Conference, Metro County Conference, and Western Metro Conference.

- Cincinnati **Courter Tech** Cavaliers (1896–1973, was Cincinnati Tech until 1923, then Central Tech until 1960, school closed)
- Cincinnati **Franklin Preparatory** Falcons (1896–1926, school burned down and closed)
- Cincinnati **Hughes** Big Red (1896–1985, to Western Metro)
- Cincinnati **Walnut Hills** Eagles (1896–1985, to Metro County)
- Cincinnati **Woodward** Bulldogs (1896–85, to Western Metro)
- Covington (KY) **Central** Bulldogs (1898–1911, dropped Ohio competition)
- Cincinnati **Ohio Military** Cadets (1898–1910, to Independents, school closed 1951)
- Cincinnati **St. Xavier** Conquistadors (1898–1931, to Greater Catholic)
- Cincinnati **Withrow** Tigers (1919–85, to Eastern Metro)
- Cincinnati **East Tech** Engineers (1923–53, school closed)
- Cincinnati **Western Hills** Mustangs (1928–85, to Metro County)
- Cincinnati **Aiken** Falcons (1962–85, to Metro County)
- Cincinnati **Taft** Senators (1965–85, to Metro County)
- Cincinnati **Academy of Physical Education (CAPE)** Crusaders (1980–85, to Cincinnati Hills)

== Clinton County League ==
This small-school county league is another that hosted members from outside their borders. In this case, Harveysburg from Warren County joined a few years before the conference ended, as the school would merge with three Clinton County schools to become Clinton-Massie. The school would actually be based in Harveysburg until a new school was built near Clarksville, in Clinton County. Blanchester was not included in the 1959–60 standings, due to growing to a AA-sized school by annexing Jefferson, but were allowed back into league play the following season. Blanchester and Clinton-Massie would concurrently play in the CCL and Fort Ancient Valley Conference for the 1964–65 school year, after which the other two CCL schools consolidated into East Clinton, who would join the FAVC nine years later.

- Ogden **Adams** Eagles (pre–1933–63, consolidated into Clinton Massie)
- **Blanchester** Wildcats (pre–1931–65, to Fort Ancient Valley Conference)
- **Clarksville** Indians (pre–1931–63, consolidated into Clinton-Massie)
- Midland **Jefferson** Blue Jays (pre–1931–59, consolidated into Blanchester)
- **Kingman** Bulldogs (pre–1931–63, consolidated into Clinton-Massie)
- **Martinsville** Rockets (pre–1931–63, consolidated into Wilmington)
- **New Vienna** Tigers (pre–1931–63, consolidated into New Kenton)
- **Port William** Bulldogs (pre–1931–63, consolidated into Wilmington)
- **Sabina** Golden Eagles (pre–1931–65, consolidated into East Clinton)
- Lees Creek **Simon Kenton** Tigers (was Wayne before 1953, pre–1931–63, consolidated into New Kenton)
- **Harveysburg** Tigers (from Warren County, 1960–63, consolidated into Clinton-Massie)
- Harveysburg/Clarksville **Clinton-Massie** Falcons (1963–65, to Fort Ancient Valley Conference)
- New Vienna **New Kenton** Tigers (1963–65, consolidated into East Clinton)

== Cross County Conference ==
The conference was originally the Darke County League, began in 1923. The League renamed itself after most of the Wayne Trace League merged with the DCL in 1978. The conference ended in 2021, as the schools split into the Three Rivers Conference and the Western Ohio Athletic Conference.

- **Ansonia** Tigers (1923-2021 (Football, 1978-2021), to WOAC)
- **Arcanum** Trojans (1923-2021, to WOAC)
- Tipp City **Bethel** Bees (1978-2021, to TRC)
- **Bradford** Railroaders (1936-2021), to WOAC)
- **Covington** Buccaneers (1991-2021, to TRC)
- Arcanum **Franklin Monroe** Jets (no football) (1952-2021, to WOAC)
- **Fort Loramie** Redskins (Football only, 2017-2021)
- Casstown **Miami East** Vikings (2006-2021, to TRC)
- Union City **Mississinawa Valley** Blackhawks (1959-2021, to WOAC)
- New Paris **National Trail** Blazers (1978-2021, to WOAC)
- Pleasant Hill **Newton** Indians (no football) (1959-2021, to WOAC)
- Lewisburg **Tri-County North** Panthers (1978-2021, Twin Valley North before 1983, to WOAC)
- New Madison **Tri-Village** Patriots (1973-2021, to WOAC)
- West Alexandria **Twin Valley South** Panthers (1978-2021, to WOAC)

Former members

- Union City **Eastside** Eagles (1923–59, consolidated into Mississinawa Valley)
- Painter Creek **Franklin Township** Falcons (1923–52, consolidated into Franklin Monroe)
- **Gettysburg** Cardinals (1923-73?, consolidated into Greenville)
- **Hollansburg** Rams (1923–55, consolidated into Westmont)
- Hunchberger Corners **Jackson** Blue Jays (1923–59, consolidated into Mississinawa Valley)
- Pitsburg **Monroe Township** Pirates (1923–52, consolidated into Franklin Monroe)
- **New Madison** Mohawks (1923–73, consolidated into Tri-Village)
- **Palestine** Eagles (1923–55, consolidated into Westmont)
- **Versailles** Tigers (1923–41, 1951–73)
- Hollansburg **Westmont** Wildcats (1955–73, consolidated into Tri-Village)
- Camden **Preble-Shawnee** Arrows (1978–84)
- **Anna** Rockets (football only, 2001–05)

== Cross County League ==
One of the short-lived conferences resulting from realignment in the Cincinnati area, the league merged into the Queen City Conference superconference in 1989.

- Batavia **Amelia** Barons (1985–89, to Queen City)
- **Forest Park** Chargers (1985–89, to Queen City)
- Cincinnati **McNicholas** Rockets (1985–89, to Queen City)
- **Norwood** Indians (1985–89, to Queen City)
- Cincinnati **Northwest** Knights (1985–89, to Queen City)
- Cincinnati **Walnut Hills** Eagles (1985–89, to Queen City)

== Darby Valley League ==
The DVL was formed in 1956, as the Madison County League was reduced through consolidation from nine schools to four over a two-year period, forcing the schools to seek other schools to compete with. Growing from its five initial schools, the conference grew to 11 schools by 1963, but never achieved any sense of stability, as schools joined and left for other conferences throughout its existence. The conference folded in 1977, as five of its members left for other leagues at the same time.

- **Ashville-Harrison** Broncos^{1} (1956–62, consolidated into Teays Valley)
- Jamestown **Greeneview** Rams^{2} (1956–77, to Kenton Trace Conference)
- Newport **Madison-South** Lions^{3} (1956–73, consolidated into Madison-Plains)
- North Lewisburg **Triad** Cardinals^{4} (1956–74, to West Central Ohio League)
- **West Jefferson** Roughriders^{3} (1956–63, to Franklin County League)
- Plain City **Jonathan Alder** Pioneers^{6} (1957–77, to Central Buckeye League)
- Mount Sterling **The Plains** Blue Devils (1957–73, consolidated into Madison-Plains)
- **Cedarville** Indians (1961–77, to Kenton Trace Conference)
- **West Liberty-Salem** Tigers (1961–67, to Logan County League)
- **Yellow Springs** Bulldogs (1961–77)
- Ashville **Teays Valley** Vikings (1962–64, to South Suburban League)
- **Mechanicsburg** Indians (1963–74, to West Central Ohio League)
- South Charleston **Southeastern** Trojans (1963–77, to Kenton Trace Conference)
- Xenia **Woodrow Wilson** Cadets (1972–77)
- London **Madison-Plains** Golden Eagles^{5} (1974–77, to South Central Ohio League)
- Dayton **Jefferson** Broncos (1975–77)
1. Concurrent with Pickaway County League 1956–61.
2. Concurrent with Greene County League 1956–61.
3. Concurrent with Madison County League 1956–57.
4. Concurrent with Champaign County League 1956–61.
5. Concurrent with South Central Ohio League 1974–75.
6. Concurrent with Central Buckeye League 1976–77)

== Eastern Hills League ==
This conference began as Milford and New Richmond, kicked out of the Clermont County League after becoming exempt schools, joined with neighbors from far eastern Hamilton County. The league ended in 1985, as major realignment took place in the Cincinnati area.

- **Indian Hill** Braves (1957–85, to Cincinnati Hills League)
- **Loveland** Tigers (1957–85, to Cincinnati Hills League)
- **Madeira** Mustangs (1957–85, to Cincinnati Hills League)
- **Mariemont** Warriors (1957–85, to Cincinnati Hills League)
- **Milford** Eagles (1957–85, to Eastern Metro Conference)
- **New Richmond** Lions (1957–69, to Clermont County League)
- **Deer Park** Wildcats (1963–85, to Cincinnati Hills League)
- Montgomery **Sycamore** Aviators (1965–85, to Eastern Metro Conference)
- **Glen Este** Trojans (1967–85, to Eastern Metro Conference)

== Eastern Metro Conference ==
One of the short-lived conferences resulting from realignment in the Cincinnati area, the league merged into the Queen City Conference superconference in 1989.

- Cincinnati **Anderson** Redskins (1985–89, to Queen City)
- Cincinnati **Glen Este** Trojans (1985–89, to Queen City)
- **Milford** Eagles (1985–89, to Greater Miami)
- Cincinnati **Sycamore** Aviators (1985–89, to Greater Miami)
- Cincinnati **Turpin** Spartans (1985–89, to Queen City)
- Cincinnati **Withrow** Tigers (1985–89, to Queen City)

== Fort Ancient Valley Conference ==
The FAVC started in 1964, as schools from the dwindling Clinton County League joined with the Warren County League, by 1999 the league became a superconference in the Southwest Region, as a large chunk of the Queen City Conference joined to help form two divisions. A later expansion took place in 2006, as the Mid-Miami League folded. However, this aggressive expansion also led to the conference's demise, as the schools decided to split into the Eastern Cincinnati Conference and Southwest Ohio Conference in 2012.

- **Blanchester** Wildcats (1964–1992, to Southern Buckeye Conference)
- Clarksville **Clinton-Massie** Falcons (1964–1977, to Kenton Trace Conference)
- Kings Mill **Kings** Knights (1964–2012, to Eastern Cincinnati Conference)
- Morrow **Little Miami** Panthers (1964–2012, to Southwest Ohio Conference)
- **Mason** Comets (1964–2007, to Greater Miami Conference)
- **Springboro** Panthers (1964–1998, to Mid-Miami League)
- **Waynesville** Spartans (1964–1977, to Kenton Trace Conference)
- Sabina **East Clinton** Astros (1974–1977, to Kenton Trace Conference)
- **Lockland** Panthers (1977–1980, to Hamilton County League)
- Hamilton **Ross** Rams (1977–2012, to Southwest Ohio Conference)
- Middletown **Madison** Mohawks (1979–1984, to Southwestern Buckeye Conference)
- **Goshen** Warriors (1986–2004, to Southern Buckeye Conference)
- **Norwood** Indians (1993–2012, to Southern Buckeye Conference)
- **Wilmington** Hurricanes (1992–2012, to South Central Ohio League)
- **Lebanon** Warriors (1997–2003, to Mid-Miami League)
- **Loveland** Tigers (1997–2012, Eastern Cincinnati Conference)
- Batavia **Amelia** Barons (1999–2010, to Southern Buckeye Conference)
- Cincinnati **Anderson** Redskins (1999–2012, to Eastern Cincinnati Conference)
- Cincinnati **Glen Este** Trojans (1999–2012, to Eastern Cincinnati Conference)
- **Harrison** Wildcats (1999–2012, to Southwest Ohio Conference)
- Cincinnati **Northwest** Knights (1999–2012, to Southwest Ohio Conference)
- Cincinnati **Turpin** Spartans (1999–2012, to Eastern Cincinnati Conference)
- Cincinnati **Walnut Hills** Eagles (2003–2012, to Eastern Cincinnati Conference)
- Cincinnati **Winton Woods** Warriors (1999–2012)
- Trenton **Edgewood** Cougars (2006–2012, to Southwest Ohio Conference)
- Cincinnati **Mount Healthy** Fighting Owls (2006–2012, to Southwest Ohio Conference)
- Oxford **Talawanda** Braves (2006–2012, to Southwest Ohio Conference)
- **Milford** Eagles (2007–2012, to Eastern Cincinnati Conference)

=== Football divisions ===
Fort Ancient Valley Conference Divisions (1999–2012)
Buckeye	Cardinal	Scarlet
Amelia (1999–2006)	Amelia (2006–2010)	Edgewood (2006–2012)
Anderson	Goshen (1999–2005)	Mount Healthy (2006–2012)
Glen Este	Kings	Northwest (2006–2012)
Harrison	Lebanon (1999–2001)	Norwood (2006–2012)
Mason (1999–2007)	Little Miami	Ross (2006–2012)
Northwest (1999–2003)	Loveland (1999–2003)	Talawanda (2006–2012)
Turpin (1999–2003)	Northwest (2003–2006)	
Winton Woods	Norwood (1999–2006)	
Loveland (2003–2012)	Ross (1999–2006)	
Walnut Hills (2003–2006)	Turpin (2003–2012)	
Milford (2007–2012)	Walnut Hills (2006–2012)	
	Wilmington	

== Girls Greater Catholic League ==
Conference Website: http://ggcl.gclsports.com/

The Girls' Greater Catholic League merged with the Greater Catholic League under one banner in 2013.

- Cincinnati **Marian** Roadrunners (1969–1981, merged with Purcell and Regina High Schools)
- Cincinnati **McAuley** Mohawks (1969–2013)
- Cincinnati **Mother of Mercy** Bobcats (1969–2013)
- Cincinnati **Mount Notre Dame** Cougars (formerly Mountaineers) (1969–2013)
- Cincinnati **Our Lady of Angels** Angels (1969–1984, merged with Roger Bacon High School)
- Cincinnati **Regina** (1969–1978)
- Cincinnati **Academy of the Sacred Heart** (1969–1970)
- Cincinnati **Seton** Saints (1969–2013)
- Evendale **St. Rita** Lions (1969–?)
- Cincinnati **St. Ursula** Bulldogs (1969–2013)
- Cincinnati **Summit Country Day** Silver Knights (1969–1978)
- Cincinnati **Ursuline Academy** Lions (formerly Hornets) (1969–2013)

== Greater Miami Valley Conference ==
The Greater Miami Valley Conference began operation during the 1982–83 school year but folded at the conclusion of the 2000–01 school year when the league merged with the Western Ohio League, forming the Greater Western Ohio Conference. The initial GMVC was formed with six schools from the Miami Central Conference - Vandalia-Butler, Northmont, Piqua, Sidney, Trotwood-Madison, and Tecumseh. They were joined by Greenville from the Southwestern Buckeye League and Troy, which withdrew from the Western Ohio League. Tecumseh left the league at the conclusion of the 1989–90 school year and was replaced with West Carrollton from the Mid-Miami League. West Carrollton eventually left the GMVC after the 1998–99 school year to re-join the Mid-Miami League, but was not replaced, leaving the league with seven schools.

- **Troy** Trojans (1982–2001)
- Vandalia **Butler** Aviators (1982–2001)
- Clayton **Northmont** Thunderbolts (1982–2001)
- **Piqua** Indians (1982–2001)
- **Sidney** Yellow Jackets (1982–2001)
- **Greenville** Green Wave (1982–2001)
- New Carlisle **Tecumseh** Arrows (1982–1990, to the Central Buckeye Conference)
- **Trotwood-Madison** Rams (1982–2001)
- **West Carrollton** Pirates (1990–99, to Mid-Miami League)

== Greene County League ==
- **Beavercreek** Beavers (192?–51, to Mid-Miami League)
- **Bellbrook** Golden Eagles (192?–61, to Dayton Suburban League 1964)
- **Bowersville** Bulldogs (192?–56, consolidated into Greeneview)
- **Cedarville** Indians (192?–61, to Darby Valley League)
- Xenia **East** Eagles (192?–58, consolidated into Xenia)
- **Fairborn** Flyers^{1} (192?–54, to Miami Valley League)
- **Jamestown-Silvercreek** Vikings (192?–56, consolidated into Greeneview)
- Grape Grove 'Ross (192?–56, consolidated into Greeneview)
- **Spring Valley** Spartans (192?–59, consolidated into Xenia)
- **Yellow Springs** Bulldogs (192?–61, to Darby Valley League)
- Jamestown **Greeneview** Rams^{2} (1956–61, to Darby Valley League)
1. Concurrent with Little 6 League 1939–54.
2. Concurrent with Darby Valley League 1956–61.

== Hamilton County League ==
- **Colerain** Cardinals (1921–85, to Metro County Conference)
- **Deer Park** Wildcats (1921–36, to Millcreek Valley Interscholastic League)
- **Finneytown** Wildcats (1921–85, to Cincinnati Hills League)
- **Forest Park** Chargers (1921–85), to Western Metro Conference)
- **Glendale** Vikings (1921–54, consolidated into Princeton)
- **Greenhills** Pioneers (1921–42, to MVIL, 1965–85, to WMC)
- **Harrison** Wildcats (1921–85, to WMC)
- **Indian Hill** Braves (1921–57, to Eastern Hills League)
- **Lockland** Panthers (1921–41, to MVIL, 1965–84, to Miami Valley Conference)
- **Madeira** Mustangs (1921–57, to EHL)
- **Mariemont** Warriors (1938–49, Plainville Blue Devils before 1949, to MVIL)
- **Mount Healthy** Owls (1921–85, to MCC)
- **North College Hill** Trojans (1921–36, to MVIL, 1965–84, to MVC)
- **Norwood** Indians (1921–85, to EMC)
- Bridgetown **Oak Hills** Highlanders (1958–85, to MCC)
- **Reading** Blue Devils (1921–31, to MVIL, 1965–85, to CHL)
- **St. Bernard-Elmwood Place** Titans (1921–36, to MVIL, 1965–84, to MVC)
- **Sharonville** Engineers (1921–54, consolidated into Princeton)
- North Bend **Taylor** Yellowjackets (1921–85, to WMC)
- **Terrace Park** Bulldogs (1921–57, consolidated into Mariemont)
- **Wyoming** Cowboys (1921–36, to MVIL, 1965–85, to CHL)
- Forestville **Anderson** Redskins (1929–85, to EMC)
- **Loveland** Tigers (1936–57, to EHL)
- Lockland **Wayne** Tigers (1938–58, consolidated into Lincoln Heights)
- Glendale **Princeton** Vikings (1954–66, to Greater Miami Conference)
- Montgomery **Sycamore** Aviators (1955–65, to EHL)
- **Lincoln Heights** Tigers (1958–70, consolidated into Princeton)
- Pleasant Run **Northwest** Knights (1971–85, to CCL)
- Turpin Hills **Turpin** Spartans (1974–85, to EMC)

The HCL operated in an East-West divisional format until 1969, when it went to American and National divisions. The table below shows the alignment the final school year of 1984-85 before the breakup of the league.

American	National
Anderson	Finneytown
Colerain	Greenhills
Forest Park	Harrison
Mount Healthy	North College Hill
Northwest	Norwood
Oak Hills	Reading
Turpin	Taylor
	Wyoming

== Kenton Trace Conference ==
- **Blanchester** Wildcats (1995–2001, to Southern Buckeye Conference)
- **Cedarville** Indians (1977–2001, to Ohio Heritage Conference)
- Clarksville **Clinton-Massie** Falcons (1977–2001, to Southern Buckeye Conference)
- Sabina **East Clinton** Astros (1977–2001, to Southern Buckeye Conference)
- Jamestown **Greeneview** Rams (1977–2001, to Ohio Heritage Conference)
- London **Madison-Plains** Golden Eagles (1985–91, 1993–97 to Buckeye Athletic Conference)
- South Charleston **Southeastern** Trojans (1977–2001, to Ohio Heritage Conference)
- **Waynesville** Spartans (1977–2001, to Southwestern Buckeye League)
- **Yellow Springs** Bulldogs (1985–98, to Metro Buckeye Conference)

== Little Six League ==
A secondary conference for schools that were larger than most of their county peers, yet too small to be competitive amongst city schools. Football was the primary sport contested, though the league crowned champions in other sports as well. The league folded when all schools had left their county leagues for conferences with similar demographics.

- Vandalia **Butler** Aviators (1939–54, to Southwestern Buckeye League)^{1}
- **Fairborn** Flyers (1939–54, to Miami Valley League)^{2}
- **Franklin** Wildcats (1939–54, to Mid-Miami League)^{3}
- **Lebanon** Warriors (1939–54, to MML)^{3}
- Monroe **Lemon-Monroe** Hornets (1939–54, to MML)^{4}
- **Northridge** Polar Bears (1939–54, to MML)^{5}
1. Concurrent with Montgomery County League 1939-41 and 1945–51, and SWBL 1941-45 and 1951-54.
2. Concurrent with Greene County League 1939-54.
3. Concurrent with Warren County League 1939-51, and MML 1951-54.
4. Concurrent with Butler County League 1939-51, and MML 1951-54.
5. Concurrent with MCL 1939-51, and MML 1951-54.

== Mad River Valley League ==
Originally the Clark County League, the MRVL gained its name in 1955, as the five remaining CCL members added Mechanicsburg, and later others from outside the original boundaries. The league's demise started in 1973, as four schools broke off to form the Three Rivers League in 1973, and folded the next year as three of the five remaining schools formed the Central Buckeye Conference.

- **Catawba** Panthers (192?–52, consolidated into Northeastern)
- Enon **Greenon** Knights (192?–74, Enon Tigers before 1955, to Central Buckeye Conference)
- **Lawrenceville** Bullskinners (192?–48, consolidated into Northwestern
- **New Carlisle** Knights (192?–51, consolidated into Tecumseh)
- **New Moorefield** Falcons (192?–52, consolidated into Northeastern)
- North Hampton **Northwestern** Warriors (192?–73, North Hampton before 1948, to Three Rivers Conference)
- **Oak Grove** Oaks (192?–49, consolidated into Enon)
- **Olive Branch** Spartans (192?–51, consolidated into Tecumseh
- **Pitchin** Panthers (192?–47, consolidated into South Charleston)
- **Plattsburgh** Pirates (192?–52, consolidated into Northeastern)
- **Selma** Spartans (192?–47, consolidated into South Charleston)
- South Charleston **Southeastern** Trojans (192?–63, South Charleston before 1951, to Darby Valley League)
- New Carlisle **Tecumseh** Arrows (1951–74, to Miami Central Conference 1975)
- Springfield **Northeastern** Jets (1952–73, to Central Buckeye Conference)
- **Mechanicsburg** Indians (1955–63, to Darby Valley League)
- St. Paris **Graham** Falcons (1959–73, to Three Rivers Conference)
- Springfield **Shawnee** Braves (1959–73, to Central Buckeye Conference)
- **Covington** Buccaneers (1964–73, to Three Rivers Conference)
- Casstown **Miami East** Vikings (1964–73, to Three Rivers Conference)
- Fairborn **Park Hills** Vikings (1973–74, to Miami Central Conference 1975)

== Metro County Conference ==
A short-lived conference formed as a result of shifting Hamilton County schools in 1985, the league merged into the Queen City Conference in 1989.

- Cincinnati **Aiken** Falcons (1985–89, to Queen City)
- Cincinnati **Colerain** Cardinals (1985–89, to Queen City)
- Cincinnati **Mount Healthy** Fighting Owls (1985–89, to Queen City)
- Cincinnati **Oak Hills** Highlanders (1985–89, to Queen City)
- Cincinnati **Western Hills** Mustangs (1985–89, to Queen City)
- Cincinnati **Woodward** Bulldogs (1985–89, to Queen City)

== Miami Central Conference ==
The Miami Central Conference began operation during the 1975–76 school year but folded at the conclusion of the 1981–82 school year. Vandalia-Butler, Northmont, Piqua, Sidney, Trotwood-Madison, and Tecumseh withdrew from the MCC to form the Greater Miami Valley Conference (GMVC) with Greenville from the Southwestern Buckeye League and Troy from the Western Ohio League. Fairborn Baker and Fairborn Park Hills merged to become Fairborn and joined the Western Ohio League, while Miamisburg and West Carrollton joined the Mid-Miami League at the start of the 1982–83 school year.

- Fairborn **Baker** Flyers (1975–82, consolidated into Fairborn)
- Vandalia **Butler** Aviators (1975–1982, to GMVC)
- **Miamisburg** Vikings (1975–82, to Mid-Miami League)
- Clayton **Northmont** Thunderbolts (1975–1982, to GMVC)
- Fairborn **Park Hills** Vikings (1975–82, consolidated into Fairborn)
- **Piqua** Indians (1975–1982, to GMVC)
- **Sidney** Yellow Jackets (1975–1982, to GMVC)
- New Carlisle **Tecumseh** Arrows (1975–82, to GMVC)
- **Trotwood-Madison** Rams (1975–1982, to GMVC)
- **West Carrollton** Pirates (1975–82, to Mid-Miami League)

== Miami County League ==
- Phoneton **Bethel** Bees (1922–59, to Logan County League 1961)
- **Bradford** Railroaders (1922–36, to Stillwater Valley League)
- **Covington** Buccaneers (1922–36, to Stillwater Valley League, 1950–59, to Mad River Valley League 1963)
- Grayson **Elizabeth Township** Eagles (1922–53, consolidated into Miami Central)
- **Lena-Conover** Red Devils (1922–59, consolidated into Miami East)
- Casstown **Lostcreek** Lions (1922–59, consolidated into Miami East)
- West Milton **Milton-Union** Bulldogs (1922–36, West Milton before 1936, to SVL)
- Pleasant Hill **Newton** Indians (1922–36, to SVL, 1951–59, to Darke County)
- **Staunton** Scotties (1922–36, to SVL, 1941–53, consolidated into Miami Central)
- Tipp City **Tippecanoe** Red Devils (1922–36, to SVL)
- Potsdam **Union Township** Panthers (1922–36, consolidated into Milton-Union)
- Staunton **Miami Central** Jets (1953–59, consolidated into Miami East)

== Miami Valley League ==
The Miami Valley League began competition during the 1926–27 school year, when the MVL held its first league championship in track. Football and basketball began with the 1927–28 school year. The league operated through the 1974–75 school year, when the three long-time members of the league formed the Miami Central Conference with similar-sized schools. In 2019 the league resumed competition after 10 teams left the Greater Western Ohio Conference. The Miami Valley League was resurrected in 2019.

- **Greenville** Green Wave (1926–72, to Southwestern Buckeye League)
- **Miamisburg** Vikings (1926–66, to Greater Miami Conference, 1967–75, to Miami Central Conference)
- **Piqua** Indians (1926–75, to Miami Central Conference)
- **Sidney** Yellow Jackets (1926–75, to Miami Central Conference)
- Tipp City **Tippecanoe** Red Devils (1926–27, to Miami County League)
- **Troy** Trojans (1926–68, to Western Ohio League)
- **Xenia** Buccaneers (1926–64, to Western Ohio League)
- Dayton **Fairview** Bulldogs (1930–33, to Dayton City League)
- Kettering **Fairmont West** Dragons (1932–64, Fairmont before 1963, to Western Ohio League)
- **Oakwood** Lumberjacks (1948–53, to Southwestern Buckeye League)
- **Fairborn** Flyers (1954–64, to Western Ohio League)
- Lima **Central Catholic** T-Birds (1969–75)
- **Bellefontaine** Chieftains (1966–74, to Central Buckeye Conference)
- **Urbana** Hillclimbers (1966–74, to Central Buckeye Conference)
- Lima **Shawnee** Indians (1966–75)
- Springfield **Catholic Central** Fighting Irish (1970–75)

== Mid-Miami League ==
- **Franklin** Wildcats (1964–2006, to Southwestern Buckeye League-Southwest)
- **Lebanon** Warriors (1964–97, to FAVC, 2001–06, to GWOC-South)
- **Lemon-Monroe** Hornets (1964–2006, to Southwestern Buckeye League-Buckeye)
- Middletown **Fenwick** Falcons (1964–2006, to Greater Catholic League-North)
- Oxford **Talawanda** Braves (1964–2006, to Fort Ancient Valley Conference-Scarlet)
- West Chester **Lakota** Thunderbirds (1966–1980, to Greater Miami Conference)
- Middletown **Madison** Mohawks (1966–1979, to Fort Ancient Valley Conference)
- Trenton **Edgewood** (1971–2006, to FAVC-Scarlet)
- **Miamisburg** Vikings (1982–2006, to GWOC-South)
- **West Carrollton** Pirates (1982–87, to Western Ohio League, 1999–2006)
- Dayton **Carroll** Patriots (1987–2006, to Greater Catholic League-North)
- Riverside **Stebbins** Indians (1997–2006, to Central Buckeye Conference-Mad River)
- **Springboro** Panthers (1998–2006, to GWOC-South)
- **Fairborn** Skyhawks (2001–06, to GWOC-South)
- **Greenville** Green Wave (2005–06)

Mid-Miami League Divisions (1999–2006, unless noted)
North Division	South Division
Carroll	Edgewood
Fairborn (2001–06)	Fenwick
Greenville (2005–06)	Franklin
Lebanon (2001–06)	Lemon-Monroe
Miamisburg	Stebbins (2005–06)
Springboro	Talawanda
Stebbins (1999–2005)	West Carrollton (2001–06)
West Carrollton (1999–2001)	

== Millcreek Valley Interscholastic League ==
- **Deer Park** Wildcats (1936–63, to Eastern Hills League)
- **Greenhills** Pioneers (1936–65, to Hamilton County League)
- **Lockland** Panthers (1936–65, to HCL)
- **North College Hill** Trojans (1936–65, to HCL)
- **Reading** Blue Devils (1936–65, to HCL)
- **St. Bernard-Elmwood Place** Titans (1936–65, to HCL)
- **Wyoming** Cowboys (1936–65, to HCL)
- **Mariemont** Warriors (1949–57, to EHL

== Paper Valley League ==
Started in 1956 as Little Southwestern League when Little Miami of the Warren County League joined with Bishop Fenwick and three Butler County League teams, who remained in the BCL initially. Little Miami returned to the WCL and was replaced by Lakota in 1959, prompting a rebrand to become the Southwestern Ohio Conference. While temporarily staving off defections to the Mid-Miami League by absorbing the rest of the BCL and having members concurrently in the MML and SOC, the conference was down to four members by 1970. After changing the name to the PVL in 1972, the league only lasted three years, as New Miami and Ross joined the Wayne Trace League, while Edgewood and Madison retained their membership in the MML.

- Middletown **Bishop Fenwick** Falcons (1956–65, to Mid-Miami League)
- Morrow **Little Miami** Panthers (1956–59, rejoined Warren County League)
- Hamilton **Ross** Rams^{1} (1956–75, to Wayne Trace League)
- **Seven Mile** Panthers^{1} (1956–70, consolidated into Edgewood)
- Oxford **Talawanda** Braves^{1} (1956–65, to Mid-Miami League)
- West Chester **Lakota** Thunderbirds (1959–66, to Mid-Miami League)
- Middletown **Madison** Mohawks^{3} (1960–75, to Mid-Miami League)
- Hamilton **New Miami** Vikings^{2} (1960–75, to Wayne Trace League)
- Oxford **Reily** Bluebirds (1965–68, consolidated into Talawanda)
- **Trenton** Trojans (1965–70, consolidated into Edgewood)
- Trenton **Edgewood** Cougars^{4} (1970–75, to Mid-Miami League)
1. Also played in Butler County League 1956–65.
2. Also played in Butler County League 1960–65.
3. Also played in Mid-Miami League 1966–75.
4. Also played in Mid-Miami League 1971–75.

== Preble County League ==
- **Camden** Cubs (1919–56, consolidated into Preble Shawnee)
- **College Corner** Trojans^{1} (1919–74, consolidated into Union County (IN))
- Five Points **Dixon** Dragons (1919–65, consolidated into Eaton)
- **Gratis** Trojans (1919–64, consolidated into Preble Shawnee)
- Campbellstown **Jackson** Redskins (1919–68, consolidated into National Trail)
- New Paris **Jefferson** Hornets (1919–68, consolidated into National Trail)
- Enterprise **Lanier** Tigers (1919–64, consolidated into Twin Valley)
- **Lewisburg** Tigers (1919–69, consolidated into Twin Valley North)
- West Manchester **Monroe** Wildcats (1919–68, consolidated into National Trail)
- **Verona** Vikings (1919–69, consolidated into Twin Valley North)
- **West Alexandria** Bulldogs (1919–64, consolidated into Twin Valley)
- **West Elkton** Yellow Jackets (1919–56, consolidated into Preble-Shawnee)
- Camden **Preble Shawnee** Arrows ^{2, 5} (1956–74, to Southwestern Ohio League)
- West Alexandria **Twin Valley South** Panthers^{2, 5} (1964–74, to Southwestern Ohio League, was Twin Valley until 1969)
- New Paris **National Trail** Blazers^{3, 5} (1968–74, to Southwestern Ohio League)
- Lewisburg **Twin Valley North** Panthers^{4, 5} (1969–74, to Southwestern Ohio League)
1. Played concurrently in the PCL and Indiana's Union County Conference 1920's-1940, and Whitewater Valley Conference 1940–1967.
2. Played concurrently in the PCL and Dayton Suburban League 1964–72.
3. Played concurrently in the PCL and Dayton Suburban League 1968–72.
4. Played concurrently in the PCL and Dayton Suburban League 1969–72.
5. Played concurrently in the PCL and Southwest Ohio League 1972–74.

== Queen City Conference ==
(1989–2002) After the Cincinnati Hills League left the Queen City Conference Alliance in 1989, the Cross County League, Eastern Metro Conference, Metro County Conference, and Western Metro Conference all combined to form this super-conference. It survived intact with a three division alignment until 1999, when seven members left for the Fort Ancient Valley Conference. Further defections led to the remaining schools (almost all Cincinnati Public Schools) to combine with the Dayton City League to form the Southwest Ohio Public League.

- Cincinnati **Aiken** Falcons (1989–2002, to SWOPL)
- Batavia **Amelia** Barons (1989–99, to FAVC)
- Cincinnati **Anderson** Redskins (1989–99, to FAVC)
- Cincinnati **Colerain** Cardinals (1989–97, to Greater Miami Conference)
- Cincinnati **Forest Park** Chargers (1989–91, consolidated into Winton Woods)
- Cincinnati **Glen Este** Trojans (1989–99, to FAVC)
- Cincinnati **Greenhills** Pioneers (1989–91, consolidated into Winton Woods)
- **Harrison** Wildcats (1989–99, to FAVC)
- Cincinnati **Hughes Center** Big Red (1989–2002, to SWOPL)
- Cincinnati **Mount Healthy** Fighting Owls (1989–2002, to SWOPL)
- Cincinnati **Northwest** Knights (1989–99, to FAVC)
- **Norwood** Indians (1989–93, to FAVC)
- Cincinnati **Oak Hills** Highlanders (1989–99, to Greater Miami Conference 2000)
- Cincinnati **Taft** Senators (1989–2002, to SWOPL)
- Cincinnati **Turpin** Spartans (1989–99, to FAVC)
- Cincinnati **Walnut Hills** Eagles (1989–2002, to SWOPL)
- Cincinnati **Western Hills** Mustangs (1989–2002, to SWOPL)
- Cincinnati **Withrow** Tigers (1989–2002, to SWOPL)
- Cincinnati **Woodward** Bulldogs (1989–2002, to SWOPL)
- Cincinnati **Winton Woods** Warriors (1991–99, to FAVC)
- Cincinnati **Jacobs** Sharks (1999–2002, to SWOPL)

Queen City Conference Divisions, 1990–99
American	Metro	National
Amelia (1990–99)	Aiken (1990–99)	Forest Park (1990–91)
Anderson (1990–99)	Colerain (1990–97)	Harrison (1990–99)
Glen Este (1990–99)	Greenhills (1990–91)	Hughes (1990–99)
Norwood (1990–2)	Oak Hills (1990–99)	Mount Healthy (1990–99)
Taft (1990–99)	Walnut Hills (1991–99)	Northwest (1990–99)
Turpin (1990–99)	Western Hills (1990–99)	Walnut Hills (1990–91)
Woodward (1990–99)	Withrow (1990–99)	Winton Woods (1991–99)

Queen City Conference Football Divisions, 1989–98 seasons (unless noted)
QCC-American	QCC-National	Metro County
Amelia	Greenhills (1989–90)	Aiken
Anderson	Harrison	Colerain (1989–96)
Forest Park (1989–90)	Hughes (1991–96)	Hughes (1997–98)
Glen Este	McNicholas (1989–90)	Mount Healthy (1989–94)
Hughes (1989–90)	Mount Healthy (1995–98)	Oak Hills (1989–96)
Oak Hills (1997–98)	Northwest	Taft (1997–98)
Taft (1991–96)	Norwood (1989–92)	Western Hills (1989–96)
Turpin	Taft (1989–90)	Withrow
Walnut Hills (1989–90)	Walnut Hills (1991–98)	Woodward (1997–98)
Western Hills (1997–98)	Winton Woods (1991–98)	
Woodward (1991–96)	Woodward (1989–90)	

== Southwest Ohio Public League ==
=== Football-Only League (2015-2018) ===
American Division

- Dayton **Dunbar** Wolverines (2015-)
- Cincinnati **Hughes Center** Big Red (2015-)
- Dayton **Meadowdale** Lions (2015-)
- Cincinnati **Shroder Paideia Academy** Jaguars (2015-)
- Cincinnati **Taft** Senators (2015-)
- Dayton **Thurgood Marshall** Cougars (2015-)
- Cincinnati **Western Hills** Mustangs (2015-)

National Division

- Cincinnati **Aiken** Falcons (2015-)
- Dayton **Belmont** Bison (2015-)
- Cincinnati **Cincinnati College Prep** Lions (2015-)
- Cincinnati **Gamble Montessori** Gators (2015-)
- Dayton **Ponitz Career Technology Center** Golden Panthers (2015-)
- Cincinnati **Riverview East Academy** Hawks (2015–16, 2017-)
- Cincinnati **Woodward** Bulldogs (2015-)

=== 2002-07 League ===
American Division

- Dayton **Colonel White** Cougars (2002–07, consolidated into **Thurgood Marshall**)
- Dayton **Dunbar** Wolverines (2002–07)
- Cincinnati **Hughes Center** Big Red (2002–07)
- Cincinnati **Taft** Senators (2002–07, played in National Division 2002-03, 2005–06)
- Cincinnati **Western Hills** Mustangs (2002–07)
- Cincinnati **Withrow** Tigers (2002–07)

National Division

- Cincinnati **Aiken** Falcons (2002–07)
- Dayton **Belmont** Bison (2002-2007)
- Cincinnati **Jacobs Paideia Academy** Sharks (2002–07, school closed)
- Dayton **Meadowdale** Lions (2002–07)
- Cincinnati **Shroder Paideia Academy** Jaguars (2002–07)
- Dayton **Stivers School for the Arts** Tigers (no football) (2002–07)
- Cincinnati **Woodward** Bulldogs (2002-2007, played in American Division 2005-06)

Former members Both teams played in the American Division while in SWOPL play. Both left for the Fort Ancient Valley Conference

- Cincinnati **Mount Healthy** Fighting Owls (2002–05)
- Cincinnati **Walnut Hills** Eagles (2002–03)

== Southwestern Rivers Conference ==
- Springfield **Catholic Central** Irish (1982–2001, to Ohio Heritage Conference)
- **Covington** Buccaneers (1982–1991, to Cross County Conference)
- St. Paris **Graham** Falcons (1982–85, 1989–2001, to Central Buckeye Conference)
- Sidney **Lehman Catholic** Cavaliers (1982–2001, to Northwest Central 2013)
- Casstown **Miami East** Vikings (1982–2001, to Central Buckeye Conference)
- West Milton **Milton-Union** Bulldogs (1982–2001, to Southwestern Buckeye League)
- Tipp City **Tippecanoe** Red Devils (1982–2001, to Central Buckeye Conference)
- **Versailles** Tigers (1982–2001, to Midwest Athletic Conference)
- Riverside **Stebbins** Indians (1993–1997, to Mid-Miami League)
- Bellefontaine **Benjamin Logan** Raiders (1997–2001, to Central Buckeye Conference)

== Stillwater Valley League ==
- **Bradford** Railroaders (1934–64, to Darke County League)^{1}
- **Covington** Buccaneers (1934–64, to Mad River Valley League)
- West Milton **Milton-Union** Bulldogs (1934–51, to Southwestern Buckeye League)^{2}
- Pleasant Hill **Newton** Indians (1934–64, to Darke County League)
- Tipp City **Tippecanoe** Red Devils (1934–51, to SWBL)^{2}
- **Versailles** Tigers (1944–64, to Darke County League)^{3}
1. Concurrent with MCL 1934-41 and 1942–64
2. Concurrent with SWBL 1944-51.
3. Concurrent with SWBL 1944-51.

== Warren County League ==
- **Carlisle** Indians (pre–1929–64, to Dayton Suburban League)
- **Franklin** Wildcats^{1} (pre–1929–51, to Mid-Miami League)
- **Harveysburg** Tigers (pre–1929–60, to Clinton County League)
- Kings Mills **Kings** Knights (pre–1929–64, to Fort Ancient Valley League)
- **Lebanon** Warriors^{1} (pre–1929–51, to Mid-Miami League)
- Mason **William Mason** Comets (pre–1929–64, to Fort Ancient Valley League)
- Morrow **Little Miami** Panthers (Morrow before 1956, pre–1929–56, 1959–64, to Fort Ancient Valley Conference)
- **Springboro** Panthers (pre–1929–64, to Fort Ancient Valley League)
- **Waynesville** Spartans (pre–1929–64, to Fort Ancient Valley League)
1. Concurrent with Little 6 League 1939–51.

== Wayne Trace League ==
The league began in 1922 as the Montgomery County League, then became the Dayton Suburban League in 1964 as the five remaining MCL schools branched out beyond the county. When the Southwestern Ohio Conference rebranded itself as the Paper Valley League in 1972, the DSL once again changed its name to the Southwestern Ohio League. Three years later, after a major shakeup where five schools left, and two Paper Valley League schools joined, leading to the WTL name. This only lasted three years, as most of the conference joined the Cross-County Conference in 1978.

- **Brookville** Blue Devils (1922–59, to Southwestern Buckeye League)
- Vandalia **Butler** Aces^{1} (1922–41, 1945–51, to Southwestern Buckeye League)
- **Centerville** Elks (1922–66, to Western Ohio League)
- New Lebanon **Dixie** Greyhounds (1922–75, to Southwestern Buckeye League)
- Kettering **Fairmont** Dragons (1922–33, left for Miami Valley League)
- Dayton **Fairview** Bulldogs (1922–31, left for Miami Valley League)
- **Farmersville** Wildcats (1922–68, consolidated into Valley View)
- **Germantown** Cardinals (1922–68, consolidated into Valley View)
- **Miamisburg** Vikings (1922–26, left for Miami Valley League)
- **Trotwood-Madison** Rams (1922–42, 1943–51, to Southwestern Buckeye League)
- **West Carrollton** Pirates (1922–46, to Southwestern Buckeye League)
- Dayton **Jefferson** Broncos (1923–75, to Darby Valley League)
- **Moraine** Mustangs (1923–45, consolidated into Fairmont)
- **Northridge** Polar Bears^{2} (1923–51, to Mid-Miami League)
- **Oakwood** Lumberjacks (1923–48, to Miami Valley League)
- **Phillipsburg** Panthers (1923–59, consolidated into Northmont)
- Englewood **Randolph Township** Bobcats (1923–54, to Southwestern Buckeye League)
- Huber Heights **Wayne** Warriors (1923–64, to Western Ohio League)
- **Bellbrook** Golden Eagles (1964–75, to Southwestern Buckeye League)
- **Carlisle** Indians (1964–75, to Southwestern Buckeye League)
- Camden **Preble-Shawnee** Arrows^{3} (1964–78, to Cross-County Conference)
- West Alexandria **Twin Valley South** Panthers^{3} (1964–78, to Cross-County Conference)
- Xenia **Woodrow Wilson** Cadets (1967–72, to Darby Valley League)
- Germantown **Valley View** Spartans (1968–75, to Southwestern Buckeye League)
- Lewisburg **Twin Valley North** Panthers^{4} (1969–78, to Cross-County Conference)
- New Paris **National Trail** Blazers^{4} (1969–78, to Cross-County Conference)
- **Eaton** Eagles (1972–78)
- Hamilton **New Miami** Vikings (1975–78)
- Hamilton **Ross** Rams (1975–78, to Fort Ancient Valley Conference)
1. Concurrent with Little 6 League 1939–41, and 1945–51.
2. Concurrent with Little 6 League 1939–51.
3. Concurrent with Preble County League 1964–74.
4. Concurrent with Preble County League 1969–74.

== West Central Ohio Conference (WCOC) ==
The WCOC began in the 1930s as the Logan County League, rebranding itself as the WCOC in 1970, as the conference had long since grown past the Logan County borders. It lasted until 2001, when most of the schools split into the Northwest Central and Ohio Heritage conferences.

- **Belle Center** Eagles (1930s–74, consolidated into Benjamin Logan)
- **DeGraff** Pirates (1930s–61, consolidated into Riverside)
- **Huntsville** Hunters (1930s–60, consolidated into Indian Lake)
- Valley Hi **Monroe Township** Mustangs (1930s–51, consolidated into Zanesfield-Monroe)
- East Liberty **Perry-Zane** Jayhawks (1930s–1960, known as Perry until 1951, consolidated into Logan Hills)
- **Quincy** Trojans (1930s–61, consolidated into Riverside)
- **Rushsylvania** Rockets (1930s–60, consolidated into Buckeye Local)
- Lakeview **Stokes Township** Spartans (1930s–60, consolidated into Indian Lake)
- Rushsylvania **Buckeye Local** Bucks (1960–70, consolidated into Benjamin Logan)
- Lewistown **Washington Local** Eagles (1930s–60, consolidated into Indian Lake)
- West Liberty **West Liberty-Salem** Tigers (1930s–2001, known as West Liberty until 1960)
- **West Mansfield** Trojans (1930s–60, consolidated into Buckeye Local)
- **Zanesfield-Monroe** Indians (1930s–1960, known as Zanesfield until 1951, consolidated into Logan Hills)
- Middlefield **Zane Township** Middies (1930s–51, consolidated into Perry-Zane)
- Lewistown **Indian Lake** Lakers (1960–1974, to Three Rivers Conference, 1976-2001)
- Zanesfield **Logan Hills** Indians (1960–70, consolidated into Benjamin Logan)
- **Waynesfield-Goshen** Tigers (1960–2001)
- Milford Center **Fairbanks** Panthers (1961–2001)
- Degraff **Riverside** Pirates (1961–2001)
- Ridgeway Ridgemont' Golden Gophers (1962–2001)
- Bellefontaine **Benjamin Logan** Raiders (1970–97)
- **Mechanicsburg** Indians (1974–2001)
- North Lewisburg **Triad** Cardinals (1974–2001)

== Western Metro Conference ==
- Cincinnati **Greenhills** Pioneers (1985–89, to Queen City)
- **Harrison** Wildcats (1985–89, to Queen City)
- Cincinnati **Hughes Center** Big Red (1985–89, to Queen City)
- **North College Hill** Trojans (1985–87, to Southern Buckeye)
- North Bend **Taylor** Yellow Jackets (1985–89, to Cincinnati Hills)
- Cincinnati **Taft** Senators (1985–89, to Queen City)

== Western Ohio League ==
Founded as a conference for larger schools in the Dayton suburban area, the league merged with the Greater Miami Valley Conference to form the Greater Western Ohio Conference in 2001.

- **Beavercreek** Beavers (1964–2001, to GWOC)
- **Fairborn** Flyers (1964–68, split into Baker and Park Hills)
- Kettering **Fairmont East** Falcons (1964–83, consolidated into Fairmont)
- Kettering **Fairmont West** Dragons (1964–83, consolidated into Fairmont)
- Springfield **North** Panthers (1964–2001, to GWOC)
- Springfield **South** Wildcats (1975–2001, to GWOC)
- Riverside **Stebbins** Indians (1964–89, to Southwestern Rivers )
- Huber Heights **Wayne** Warriors (1964–2001, to GWOC)
- **Xenia** Buccaneers (1964–2001, to GWOC)
- **Centerville** Elks (1968–2001, to GWOC)
- Fairborn **Baker** Flyers (1968–75, to Miami Central)
- **Troy** Trojans (1968–82, to Greater Miami Valley)
- Dayton **Carroll** Patriots (1982–87, to Mid-Miami)
- **Fairborn** Skyhawks (1983–2001, to Mid-Miami)
- Kettering **Fairmont** Firebirds (1983–2001, to GWOC)
- **West Carrollton** Pirates (1987–90, to GMVC)

== See also ==
- Ohio High School Athletic Association
- Ohio high school athletic conferences
- OHSAA Southwest Region athletic conferences
