= Eastern Cincinnati Conference =

Ohioan high school athletic conference

The Eastern Cincinnati Conference (ECC) is an Ohio high school athletic conference in the eastern Cincinnati area, part of the Southwestern Ohio Region. The ECC consists of ten high schools: Anderson, Kings, Loveland, Milford, Turpin, Walnut Hills, West Clermont, Lebanon, Little Miami, and Winton Woods. Each of these schools compete in a variety of OHSAA fall, winter, and spring sports in Divisions I, II, and III.

== Timeline of membership ==
- 2012: Conference founded with Anderson, Glen Este, Kings, Loveland, Milford, Turpin, and Walnut Hills as founding members.
- 2014: Withrow joins the conference as the 8th member; they had been a member of the Cincinnati Metro Athletic Conference.
- 2017: Glen Este consolidates with Amelia High School into West Clermont High School, remaining in the conference.
- 2020: Withrow leaves the conference to rejoin the Cincinnati Metro Athletic Conference. Lebanon (formerly GWOC), Little Miami (SWOC), and Winton Woods (independent) join the conference as the 8th, 9th, and 10th members.

== Fall sports ==
The ECC officially recognizes the following as Fall sports: boys and girls cross country, boys football, boys and girls soccer, girls volleyball, girls tennis, and boys and girls golf.

=== Football ===
Football is one of the most competitive sports in the ECC, with games taking place on Friday nights during the fall, usually late August to early November, depending on how far the teams advance in the playoffs. Teams play every other team in the conference once during the regular season, then add the requisite number of non-conference games to complete a 10-game schedule (currently, each team plays 1 non-conference game per regular season).

==== Conference champions ====
- 2012: Turpin (12-1, 6-0 ECC)
- 2013: Loveland (15-0, 6-0 ECC)
- 2014: Kings (11-1, 7-0 ECC)
- 2015: Kings (11-2, 6-1 ECC), Turpin (10-2, 6-1 ECC), Turpin won regular season matchup but lost playoff rematch
- 2016: Turpin (11-1, 7-0 ECC)
- 2017: Anderson (10-2, 6-1 ECC), Milford (8-3, 6-1 ECC), West Clermont (7-4, 6-1 ECC), each team beat each other once
- 2018: Kings (9-2, 7-0 ECC)
- 2019: Turpin (10-1, 7-0 ECC)
- 2020: Winton Woods (9-1, 5-0 ECC), Kings (7-1, 3-0 ECC), teams did not play each other in regular season due to COVID, Winton Woods won playoff matchup
- 2021: Kings (11-1, 8-0 ECC)
- 2022: Winton Woods (12-1, 9-0 ECC)
- 2023: Milford (11-1, 9-0 ECC)
- 2024: Anderson (15-1, 9-0 ECC)
- 2025: Anderson (14-1, 9-0 ECC)

==== Regional champions ====
- 2013: Loveland (won DII Region 8, won DII state title over Glenville)
- 2021: Winton Woods (won DII Region 8, won DII state title over Archbishop Hoban)
- 2022: Kings (won DII Region 8, lost in DII state semifinals to Toledo Central Catholic)
- 2023: Anderson (won DII Region 8, lost in DII state semifinals to Massillon)
- 2024: Anderson (won DII Region 8, lost DII state championship game to Avon)
- 2025: Anderson (won DII Region 8, lost DII state championship game to Avon)

=== Soccer ===
Soccer is another popular sport played by the members of Eastern Cincinnati Conference (ECC) before and even after the establishment of the league in 2012. Seven combined state championships in boys' and girls' soccer have been achieved by Turpin High School since the 1980s. Boys' soccer teams from Walnut Hills and Turpin have taken all ECC championships after the formation of the league. In terms of girls' soccer, Milford won ECC championship in 2012, Loveland in 2013 and 2014, and Turpin in 2015.

=== Cross Country ===
Cross Country is another sport with both boys and girls teams that compete in the ECC. In cross country, schools will send their runners to meets, where they compete for the fastest completion of a 5-kilometer race (referred to as a 5K run). For boys cross country, all schools except Withrow have boys competing in varsity cross country. Casey Gallagher from Anderson set the ECC boys cross country record for the 5K run in 2012 at 15 minutes 56 seconds during the Trinity Meet. A close second was made Alaeldin Tirba from Turpin with a 15-minute 59.70-second run. Since then, nobody in the ECC has gotten under the 16:00 mark at an official 5K run. In the 2015 season, there were 192 runners in the ECC, with the fastest 5K run time going to Nick Stone (Anderson), with a 16:19 time. Girls Cross Country also competes in ECC 5K races, with Walnut Hills or Turpin winning the 5K run fastest time of all four seasons. The fastest girls 5K run in ECC history was set in the 2015 season with an 18:28 time by Samantha Bush (Turpin) at the Ross Meet.

== Winter sports ==
=== Men's basketball ===
At the conference's founding, each team played each conference opponent twice, then played enough non-conference games to fill a 22-game schedule. When the conference expanded to 10 teams, the number of conference games was set at 16, meaning each team plays seven opponents twice and two opponents once.

==== Conference champions ====
- 2012-13: Walnut Hills (27-2, 12-0 ECC)
- 2013-14: Kings (14-7, 9-3 ECC), Walnut Hills (14-9, 9-3 ECC), Turpin (11-12, 9-3 ECC), each team went 1-1 against each other in the regular season
- 2014-15: Milford (22-4, 12-2 ECC), Kings (18-5, 12-2 ECC), Milford won both regular season matchups
- 2015-16: Kings (16-7, 12-2 ECC)
- 2016-17: Walnut Hills (18-7, 12-2 ECC)
- 2017-18: Walnut Hills (18-6, 13-1 ECC)
- 2018-19: West Clermont (17-6, 12-2 ECC)
- 2019-20: Turpin (21-4, 13-1 ECC)
- 2020-21: Walnut Hills (17-4, 12-2 ECC), Turpin (14-8, 12-2 ECC), Lebanon (16-4, 11-2 ECC), Turpin went 3-1 against other two, Walnut Hills 1-2, Lebanon 1-2
- 2021-22: Walnut Hills (23-3, 15-1 ECC)
- 2022-23: Anderson (22-4, 13-3 ECC), Kings (18-6, 13-3 ECC), Turpin (17-6, 13-3 ECC), Turpin went 3-1 against other two, Kings 2-1, Anderson 0-3
- 2023-24: Winton Woods (19-4, 14-2 ECC)
- 2024-25: Winton Woods (23-3, 15-1 ECC)

==== District champions ====
- 2012-13: Walnut Hills (won Dayton 1 district, won DI Region 4 championship over La Salle, lost in state semifinals to Toledo Rogers)
- 2024-25: Winton Woods (won Southwest 1 district, lost DII Region 8 championship to Toledo St. Francis de Sales)
- 2024-25: Loveland (won Southwest 2 district, lost in DII Region 8 semifinals to Toledo St. Francis de Sales)

=== Bowling ===
Bowling is another sport with boys and girls teams that compete in matches and the highest score wins. To determine who wins the ECC is standings. All teams in the ECC do bowling except Withrow. Girls bowling, 2012 Glen Este has been crowned champions in 2012 all the way to 2016. The 2016–17 champions of the ECC was clinched by Glen Este & Milford. In 2017–18 Milford clinched the ECC title. In 2018–19 West Clermont clinched the ECC title. In 2019–20, Loveland got its first title and captured the ECC title. For the 2020 girls statistics, Lexi Stewart, West Clermont was the leader with an average of 191.9. For the boys bowling, Glen Este has had 6 title wins, while Loveland has 1, Anderson has 2, and Kings has 1. For the 2019–20 season the boys' leader is Jarryd Forthuber, West Clermont with an average of 222.7.
