= Joe Smith (pitcher) =

American baseball player (born 1984)

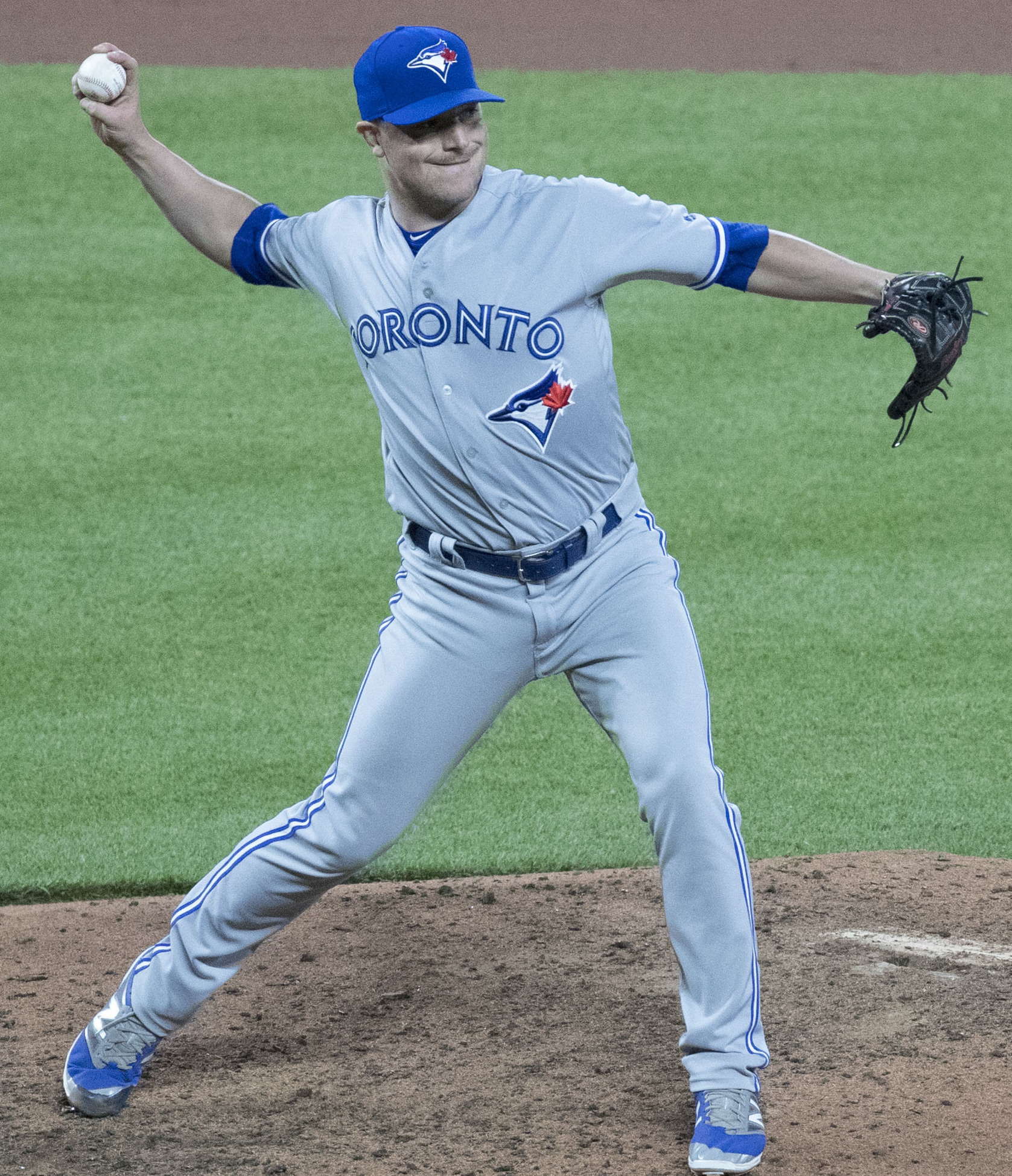
- Smith with the Toronto Blue Jays in 2017
- Pitcher
- Born: March 22, 1984 (age 42); Cincinnati, Ohio, U.S.
- Batted: Right Threw: Right

MLB debut
- April 1, 2007, for the New York Mets

Last MLB appearance
- August 2, 2022, for the Minnesota Twins

MLB statistics
- Win–loss record: 55–34
- Earned run average: 3.14
- Strikeouts: 666
- Stats at Baseball Reference

Teams
- New York Mets (2007–2008); Cleveland Indians (2009–2013); Los Angeles Angels of Anaheim / Los Angeles Angels (2014–2016); Chicago Cubs (2016); Toronto Blue Jays (2017); Cleveland Indians (2017); Houston Astros (2018–2019, 2021); Seattle Mariners (2021); Minnesota Twins (2022)

Joseph Michael Smith (born March 22, 1984) is an American former professional baseball pitcher. He played in Major League Baseball (MLB) for the New York Mets, Cleveland Indians, Los Angeles Angels, Chicago Cubs, Toronto Blue Jays, Houston Astros, Seattle Mariners, and Minnesota Twins. Smith attended Wright State University and was drafted by the Mets in the third round of the 2006 Major League Baseball draft. He made his major league debut in 2007.

== High school and college ==
Smith attended Amelia High School in Batavia, Ohio. He was a three-year varsity letterman in baseball and an All-Fort Ancient Valley Conference honoree, Smith also pitched five years for the select American Amateur Baseball Congress Midland team in Cincinnati. Even through his labrum surgery, he was dedicated to returning to baseball.

In college at Wright State University, Smith redshirted for the Wright State Raiders and played three years in Horizon League competition. Ultimately, Smith became Wright State's closer during his junior and senior years, as he gained 4–6 miles per hour (6.4–9.7 km/h) on his fastball after changing his delivery. In his senior season, he had 13 saves and a 0.98 earned run average (ERA). In three seasons Smith posted 22 saves, 145 strikeouts, and 39 walks. In 2005, he was the WSU team MVP and in 2006 he was awarded second-team All-Mideast Region, first-team Horizon League, Horizon League Pitcher of the Year, and WSU Most Valuable Male Athlete.

In 2004, Smith played collegiate summer baseball with the New England Collegiate Baseball League with the North Adams Steeplecats. In 2005, Smith briefly pitched for the Rockville Express, a team in the Cal Ripken, Sr. Collegiate Baseball League. In 2005, he made nine appearances for the Express, posting a 4.66 ERA, a 1–0 win–loss record, and earning two saves. Later in the summer of 2005, Smith also pitched for the Edenton Steamers in the Coastal Plain League. In 16 regular-season appearances, totaling 17 1/3 innings pitched, he tallied nine saves with a 2.08 ERA, a .197 batting average against, and struck out 19 batters. He also recorded the final out of the 2005 Petitt Cup tournament, on a comebacker, to give Edenton its second consecutive league championship.

== Professional career ==
=== New York Mets ===
The New York Mets selected Smith in the third round of the 2006 MLB draft. Smith began his professional career with the Brooklyn Cyclones of the Low–A New York–Penn League. He was named one of the top 20 prospects in the New York–Penn League by Baseball America. When Duaner Sánchez was hurt during a taxi cab incident in 2006, Mets general manager Omar Minaya considered recalling Smith to the major leagues. Instead, the Mets traded for Roberto Hernández and Óliver Pérez to give Smith more time in the minors.

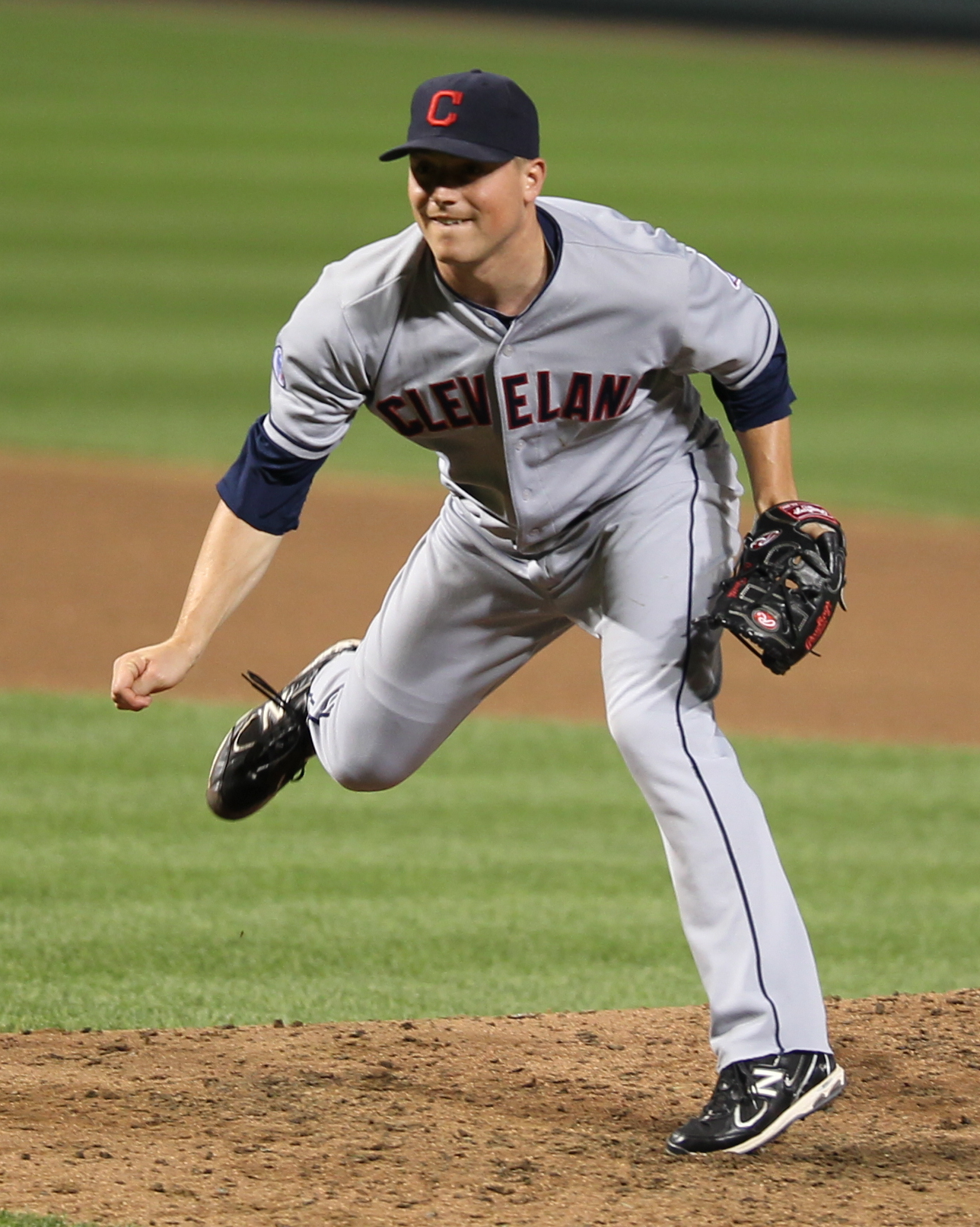
Smith with the Cleveland Indians in 2011

Smith made the Mets' Opening Day 25-man roster in 2007. On April 1, 2007, Smith made his major league debut. He struck out one (Preston Wilson) and walked one (Albert Pujols). He also gave up a single to David Eckstein. Smith earned his first major league win on April 24, 2007, after coming on in relief in the 12th inning. Smith enjoyed much success at the beginning of 2007 but began to tire and was sent down to the minors at mid-year. Smith was with the Mets for the 2008 season, enjoying varied success. He went 6–3 in 63.3 innings with a 3.55 ERA.

=== Cleveland Indians ===
On December 10, 2008, Smith was traded by the Mets to the Cleveland Indians as part of a twelve-player, three-team deal. On January 18, 2013, the Cleveland Indians announced they had avoided arbitration with Smith, signing him to a one-year contract worth $3.15 million.

Smith became a free agent following the 2013 season but expressed interest in remaining with the Tribe.

=== Los Angeles Angels of Anaheim / Los Angeles Angels ===
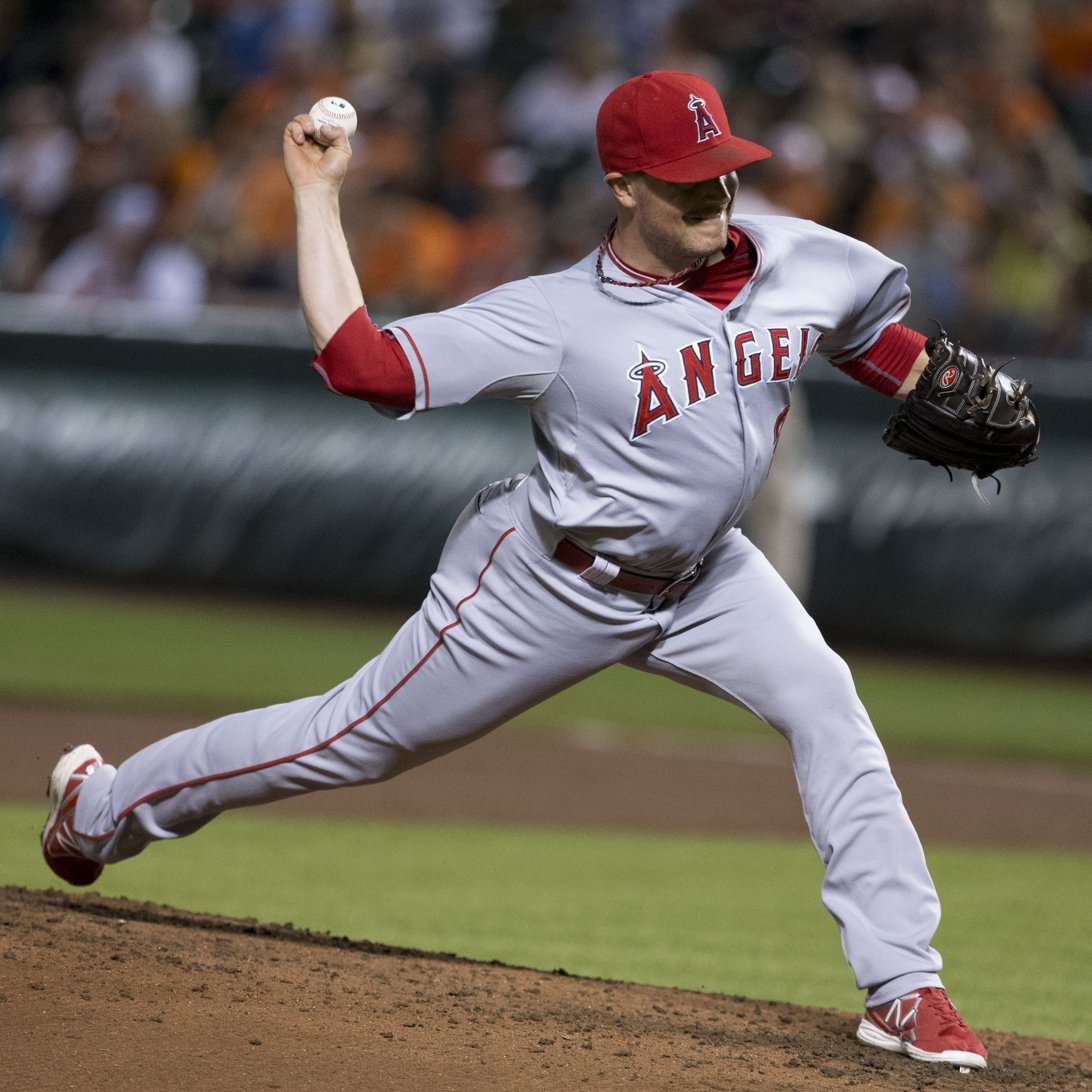
Smith with the Angels in 2015

On November 24, 2013, Smith reportedly agreed to a three-year contract for $15 million with the Los Angeles Angels of Anaheim, pending the completion of a physical. On November 27, 2013, the Angels confirmed that the team and Smith agreed to the terms. On April 25, 2014, Smith was named the Angels' new closer after multiple struggles by former closer Ernesto Frieri. After the Angels traded for San Diego Padres' All-Star closer Huston Street on July 18, 2014, Smith was moved to an eighth-inning setup role. Smith finished 2014 with 15 saves in 76 games, achieving a 1.81 ERA on 1105 pitches.

On June 8, 2016, Smith went on the disabled list with a hamstring injury.

=== Chicago Cubs ===
On August 1, 2016, the Angels traded Smith to the Chicago Cubs for prospect Jesús Castillo. In 16 more appearances with the Cubs to finish 2016, Smith had a 1-1 record and a 2.51 ERA. Overall in 2016, combined with both teams he played for, Smith made 54 total appearances with a 1-4 record and a 3.82 ERA. Smith was a member of the Cubs' 2016 World Series championship team but did not make any postseason appearances.

=== Toronto Blue Jays ===
On February 9, 2017, Smith signed a one-year, $3 million contract with the Toronto Blue Jays. Smith became the Blue Jays setup man early in the season, after Jason Grilli struggled in the role and Joe Biagini was moved to the starting rotation. He was placed on the 10-day disabled list on June 19 with shoulder inflammation. In 38 games, he was 3-0 with a 3.28 ERA in 35 2/3 innings.

=== Cleveland Indians (second stint) ===
On July 31, 2017, the Blue Jays traded Smith to the Cleveland Indians for Thomas Pannone and Samad Taylor. In 18 1/3 innings, he had an ERA of 3.44 for the Indians.

=== Houston Astros ===
On December 13, 2017, Smith signed a two-year contract with the Houston Astros worth $15 million. In his first season in Houston, Smith appeared in 56 games, recording a record of 5-1 in 45 2/3 innings with a 3.74 ERA. On December 13 while working out, Smith suffered a ruptured left Achilles tendon. He underwent surgery for it on December 20.

In 2019, Smith was 1–0 with a 1.80 ERA in 28 relief appearances in which he pitched 25.0 innings.

On December 16, 2019, Smith resigned with the Astros on a two-year contract worth $8 million. Smith did not play in the abbreviated 60-game 2020 season and forfeited his $4M salary after returning to Ohio to spend time with his mother who was battling the final stages of Huntington's disease. Smith returned to the Astros in 2021, but struggled to a 7.48 ERA in 27 appearances with the team.

=== Seattle Mariners ===
On July 27, 2021, Smith was traded to the Seattle Mariners along with Abraham Toro in exchange for Rafael Montero and Kendall Graveman.

=== Minnesota Twins ===
On March 20, 2022, Smith signed with the Minnesota Twins. In 34 appearances for Minnesota, he registered a 4.61 ERA with 17 strikeouts across 27 1/3 innings of work. On August 3, Smith was designated for assignment by the Twins. He was released on August 5.

On January 31, 2024, Smith announced his retirement from professional baseball via Instagram.

== Pitching style ==
Smith's pitching style is different from most. According to hitters, he comes at the batter from third base. His release point is about 4:30 on the analog clock, lower than sidearm, and higher than submarine. Smith's fastball usually is at 88–90 mph, sometimes reaching 93 mph. His fastball can even be considered a sinker because of its hard downward movement. He routinely gets ground balls because of this. Smith also throws a slider and a changeup.

== Personal life ==
Smith is married to Turner Sports reporter Allie LaForce. Their first child, a son, was born in 2022.

In 2012, Smith's mother was diagnosed with Huntington's disease; the condition leads to the death of nerve cells in the brain. Smith has a 50% chance of inheriting the condition. Smith and LaForce dedicate much of their free time to raising awareness for their organization HelpCureHD.org, which provides funding for couples to go through the PGD-IVF process as a way to stop the disease from continuing to future generations.
