= Madison Junior-Senior High School =

Madison Junior-Senior High School may refer to:

- Madison Junior-Senior High School in Middletown, Ohio.
- James Madison Junior-Senior High School in Houston, Texas, now known as Madison High School
