= William Henry Harrison High School =

William Henry Harrison High School is a name for at least three high schools in the United States. William Henry Harrison High Schools include:

- William Henry Harrison High School (Evansville, Indiana), Evansville, Indiana
- William Henry Harrison High School (Tippecanoe, Indiana), with a West Lafayette, Indiana post office address
- William Henry Harrison High School (Ohio), Harrison, Ohio
