= Curtis Enis =

American football player (born 1976)

No. 39, 44,26
- Position: Running back

Personal information
- Born: June 15, 1976 (age 50); Union City, Ohio, U.S.
- Listed height: 6 ft 0 in (1.83 m)
- Listed weight: 250 lb (113 kg)

Career information
- High school: Mississinawa Valley (Union City)
- College: Penn State (1995–1997)
- NFL draft: 1998: 1st round, 5th overall pick

Career history
- Chicago Bears (1998–2000); Cleveland Browns (2001)*
- * Offseason or practice squad member only

Awards and highlights
- Consensus All-American (1997); Big Ten Co-Offensive Player of the Year (1997); Big Ten Co-Freshman of the Year (1995); 2× First-team All-Big Ten (1996, 1997)

Career NFL statistics
- Rushing yards: 1,497
- Rushing average: 3.3
- Rushing touchdowns: 4
- Receptions: 59
- Receiving yards: 428
- Receiving touchdowns: 2
- Stats at Pro Football Reference

Curtis D. Enis (born June 15, 1976) is an American former professional football player who was a running back for three seasons in the National Football League (NFL). He played college football for the Penn State Nittany Lions, earning consensus All-American honors in 1997. Enis was selected by the Chicago Bears in the first round of the 1998 NFL draft.

== Early life ==
Enis was born in Union City, Ohio. He attended Mississinawa Valley High School in Union City, where he was named a Parade magazine high school All-American, and voted Ohio's Mr. Football Award by the Associated Press. He was a three-time all-state selection at linebacker, and Most Valuable Player of the 1994 Big 33 Football Classic. He spent one year at The Kiski School in Saltsburg, Pennsylvania.

== College career ==
Enis attended Pennsylvania State University, where he majored in recreational management and played for coach Joe Paterno's Penn State Nittany Lions football team from 1995 to 1997. Following his junior season in 1997, he was recognized as a consensus first-team All-American.

His rushing stats at Penn State were:

- 1995–113 attempts, 683 yards, 4 Touchdowns
- 1996-224 Attempts, 1,210 yards, 13 Touchdowns
- 1997-228 attempts, 1,363 yards, 19 Touchdowns

== Professional career ==
Pre-draft measurables
Height	Weight	Arm length	Hand span
6 ft 0 5/8 in (1.84 m)	242 lb (110 kg)	32 1/8 in (0.82 m)	10 in (0.25 m)
All values from NFL Combine

Enis initially held out and missed 26 days of training camp and two preseason games after being drafted by the Chicago Bears in the first round with the fifth overall pick.

Enis made just one start before tearing a ligament in his left knee in November 1998. His career in Chicago was largely defined by struggling to stay on the field as a result of injuries, and by poor production when he did play. By 2000, Enis had been supplanted by James Allen and was being utilized as a FB. In three years, he played 36 games, accumulating 1,497 rushing yards and 4 touchdowns.

In 2001, at the age of 24, Enis signed a one-year deal with the Cleveland Browns, but a degenerative condition in his left knee forced him into retirement.

=== NFL statistics ===
Year	Team	GP	Rushing					Receiving				
Year	Team	GP	Att	Yds	Avg	Lng	TD	Rec	Yds	Avg	Lng	TD
1998	CHI	9	133	497	3.7	29	0	6	20	3.3	7	0
1999	CHI	15	287	916	3.2	19	3	45	340	9.6	28	2
2000	CHI	12	36	84	2.3	11	1	8	68	8.5	18	0
Career		36	456	1,497	3.3	29	4	59	428	7.3	28	2

== Post-playing career ==
After retiring, Enis was hired by ABInBev as an Operation Manager.

Enis was the head football coach at Bradford High School in Bradford, Ohio from 2010 to 2013. Enis was the Ohio High School Athletic Association (OHSAA) Division VI Coach of the Year in 2010. He resigned from that position in August 2014.
