= 1901 St. Xavier Saints football team =

American college football season

1901 St. Xavier Saints football

Interscholastic League champion
- Conference: Interscholastic League
- Record: 9–0 ( Interscholastic League)
- Head coach: None
- Captain: Mark Mitchell
- Home stadium: Norwood Inn Park

The 1901 St. Xavier Musketeers football team was an American football team that represented St. Xavier College (later renamed Xavier University) as a member of the Interscholastic League during the 1901 college football season. The team compiled a 9–0 record, shut out five of nine opponents, and outscored all opponents by a total of 234 to 28. The team won the Interscholastic League championship and, with it, The Enquirer Pennant. Fullback Mark Mitchell was the team captain.

== Schedule ==
Date	Opponent	Site	Result	Attendance	Source
October 3	at Hamilton High School	Butler County Fairgrounds; Hamilton, OH	W 11–0	4,000	
October 10	Cincinnati Technicals		W 28–5		
October 17	Franklin School	Norwood Inn Park; Cincinnati, OH	W 26–0		
October 24	Woodward High School	Cincinnati, OH	W 22–0		
November 14	Hughes High School	Cincinnati, OH	W 50–5		
November 21	Walnut Hills High School	Norwood Inn Park; Cincinnati, OH	W 12–6		
December 3	St. Xavier alumni	Norwood Inn Park; Cincinnati, OH	W 18–12		
	Ohio Military Institute		W 17–0		
	Hamilton High School		W 50–0		
