= West Clermont High School =

Location
- 4101 Bach Buxton Road; Batavia, Ohio 45103; United States; 39°04′15″N 84°14′55″W

Information
- Type: Public, coeducational high school
- Opened: August 30, 2017
- School district: West Clermont Local School District
- CEEB code: 360994
- Principal: Kristin Kauffman
- Teaching staff: 109.00 (FTE)
- Grades: 9–12
- Enrollment: 2,172 (2023-2024)
- Student to teacher ratio: 19.93
- Campus size: 79.12 acres (32.02 ha)
- Campus type: Suburban
- Colors: Navy blue and gray
- Athletics conference: Eastern Cincinnati Conference
- Nickname: Wolves
- Website: www.westcler.k12.oh.us/WCHS/home
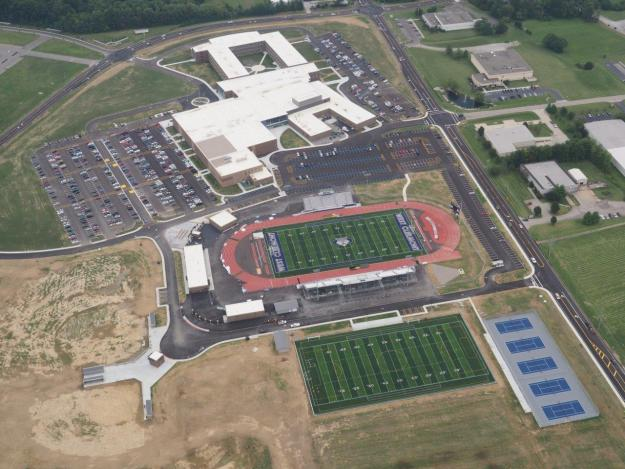

West Clermont High School (abbreviated WCHS) is a public co-ed high school in Union Township, Clermont County, Ohio, United States. It is the West Clermont Local School District's only high school, due to the 2017 merger of Amelia and Glen Este high schools. WCHS is a suburban area located west of Batavia.
