= Peyton Burdick =

American baseball player (born 1997)

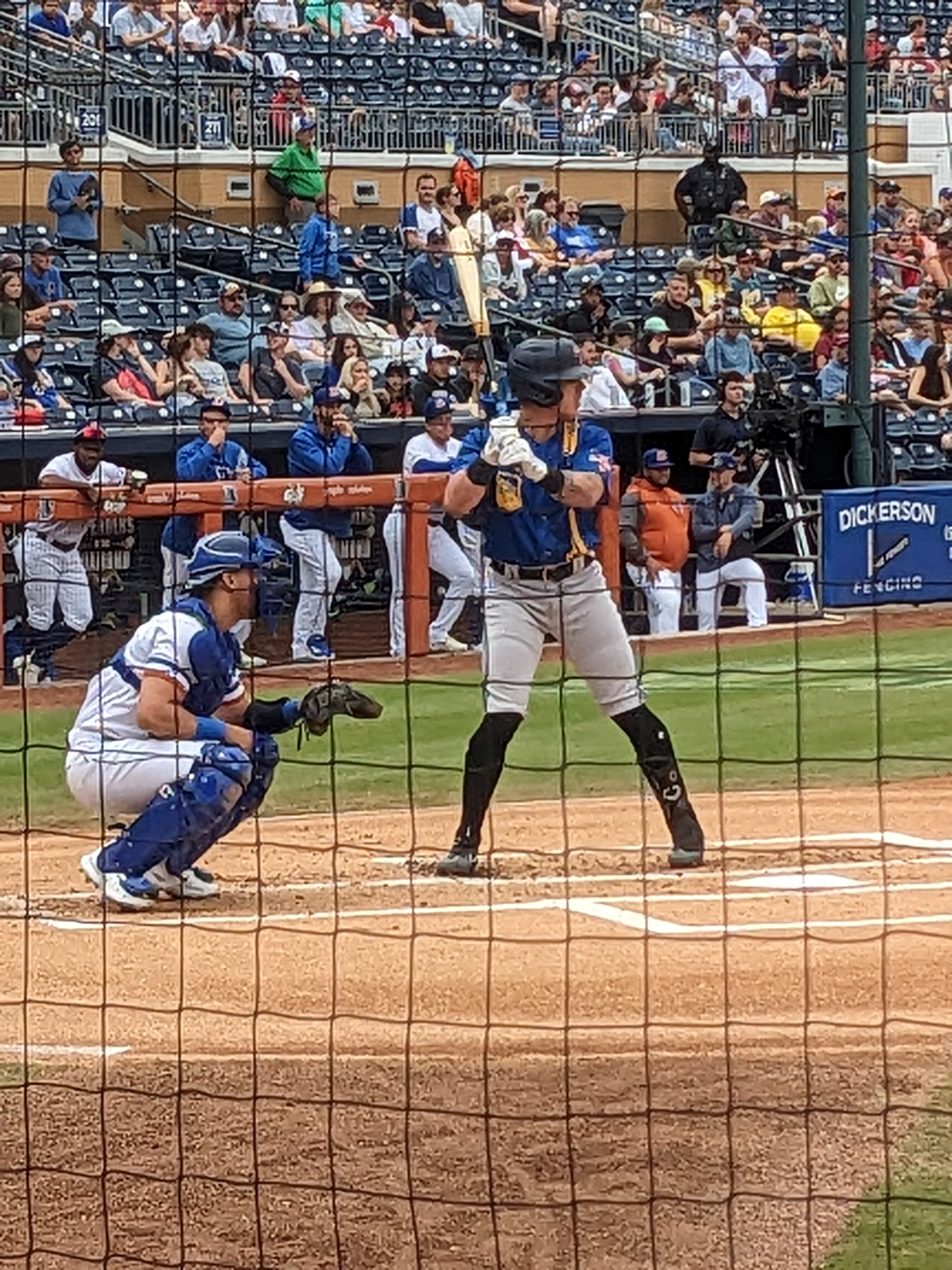
- Burdick at bat for the Jacksonville Jumbo Shrimp in 2022
- Outfielder
- Born: February 26, 1997 (age 29); Batavia, Ohio, U.S.
- Batted: Right Threw: Right

MLB debut
- September 2, 2022, for the Miami Marlins

Last MLB appearance
- May 21, 2023, for the Miami Marlins

MLB statistics
- Batting average: .200
- Home runs: 5
- Runs batted in: 13
- Stats at Baseball Reference

Teams
- Miami Marlins (2022-2023)

Edmund Peyton Burdick (born February 26, 1997) is an American former professional baseball outfielder. He played in Major League Baseball (MLB) for the Miami Marlins. He played college baseball at Wright State University. Burdick was selected by the Marlins in the third round of the 2019 MLB draft and made his MLB debut for them in 2022.

== Amateur career ==
Burdick attended Glen Este High School in Cincinnati, Ohio, where he played baseball, basketball, and football. In 2014, as a junior, he batted .368 alongside pitching to a 2.13 ERA.

He was undrafted in the 2015 Major League Baseball draft, and enrolled at Wright State University where he played college baseball. In 2016, his freshman season at Wright State, he batted .289 with four home runs and 31 RBIs over 63 games. In the summer of 2016, he stayed home and played in the Great Lakes Summer Collegiate League with the Cincinnati Steam, hitting .316 in 19 at-bats before an injury sidelined him for the rest of the summer. He missed the 2017 season after undergoing Tommy John surgery. He returned to play in 2018, hitting .347 with nine home runs and 65 RBIs over 56 starts. That summer, he played in the Cape Cod Baseball League with the Cotuit Kettleers. In 2019, his redshirt junior season, he slashed .407/.538/.729 with 15 home runs and 72 RBIs over 59 games.

== Professional career ==
=== Miami Marlins ===
After the season, Burdick was selected by the Miami Marlins in the third round of the 2019 Major League Baseball draft. He signed and made his professional debut with the Batavia Muckdogs of the Low–A New York–Penn League before being promoted to the Clinton LumberKings of the Single–A Midwest League. Over 69 games between the two clubs, he batted .308 with 11 home runs, 64 RBIs, and twenty doubles. He did not play in a game in 2020 due to the cancellation of the minor league season because of the COVID-19 pandemic. To begin the 2021 season, he was assigned to the Pensacola Blue Wahoos of the Double-A South, slashing .231/.376/.472 with 23 home runs, 52 RBIs, and 135 strikeouts (2nd in the league) over 373 at bats in 106 games. He set Pensacola single-season records for home runs and walks (76). After Pensacola's season ended, he was promoted to the Jacksonville Jumbo Shrimp of the Triple-A East in mid-September with whom he appeared in eight games, batting .143. Miami named Burdick their Minor League Player of the Year. He returned to Jacksonville to begin the 2022 season.

On August 4, 2022, the Marlins selected Burdick's contract and promoted him to the major leagues. He made his MLB debut the next day as the team's starting left fielder versus the Chicago Cubs at Wrigley Field, going hitless over four plate appearances with three strikeouts and an eight pitch walk. He recorded his first MLB hit on August 6 with a single off of Drew Smyly. He hit his first MLB home run on August 7, a solo home run off of Adrian Sampson. He appeared in 32 games in his rookie campaign, hitting .207/.284/.380 with 4 home runs and 11 RBI.

Burdick was optioned to Triple-A Jacksonville to begin the 2023 season, with whom he batted .219 with 180 strikeouts (3rd in the International League) in 420 at bats.

He played in 14 games for Miami in 2023, batting .182/.270/.333 with one home run, two RBI, and one stolen base. Burdick was designated for assignment on February 9, 2024, following the acquisition of Darren McCaughan.

=== Baltimore Orioles ===
On February 14, 2024, the Marlins traded Burdick to the Baltimore Orioles in exchange for cash considerations. He was designated for assignment by them on February 19, following the acquisition of Kaleb Ort. Burdick was then claimed off waivers by the Chicago White Sox on February 23. He was designated for assignment by Chicago on March 13 and re-claimed by Baltimore three days later. Burdick was optioned to the Triple–A Norfolk Tides to begin the 2024 season. In 16 games for Norfolk, he hit .182/.333/.455 with four home runs and nine RBI. Burdick was designated for assignment following the promotion of David Bañuelos on April 22.

=== Cincinnati Reds ===
On April 24, 2024, Burdick was claimed off waivers by the Cincinnati Reds. In 47 games for the Triple–A Louisville Bats, he hit .189/.291/.342 with seven home runs and 16 RBI. On June 28, Burdick was designated for assignment by the Reds. He cleared waivers and was sent outright to Louisville on June 30. Burdick was released by the Reds organization on December 19.
