= Twin Valley Community Local Schools =

School district in Ohio, United States

Address
- 100 Education Drive West Alexandria, Ohio, 45381; United States

District information
- Type: Public
- Grades: PK–12
- Schools: 3
- NCES District ID: 3904900

Students and staff
- Students: 740 (2025–2026)
- Teachers: 42.91 (on an FTE basis) (2025–2026)
- Staff: 96.47 (on an FTE basis) (2025–2026)
- Student–teacher ratio: 17.25 (2025–2026)

Other information
- Website: www.tvs.k12.oh.us

Twin Valley Community Local Schools is a school district headquartered in West Alexandria, Ohio. It includes an elementary school (Twin Valley South Elementary School), a middle school (Twin Valley South Middle School), and a high school (Twin Valley South High School), all at the same address.

The district includes West Alexandria, and covers the majority of Lanier and Twin townships, and portions of Gasper and Gratis townships.

== History ==
Scott Cottingim became the superintendent in 2019.

In 2023, the district had plans to establish a new facility for school buses.

== See also ==
- Brittanie Cecil (1988–2002), a student at the school who died from injuries suffered while attending an NHL game
