= Tri-County North High School =

Location
- 436 North Commerce St. Lewisburg, (Preble County), Ohio 45338; United States; 39°51′02″N 84°32′13″W

Information
- Type: Public, Coeducational high school
- Superintendent: William Derringer
- Principal: Kristen Mills
- Grades: 9-12
- Colors: Scarlet and Gray
- Athletics conference: Western Ohio Athletic Conference
- Team name: Panthers
- Rival: Twin Valley South High School
- Athletic Director: Kristen Mills
- Website: https://www.tcnschools.com/

Tri-County North High School is a public high school located in Lewisburg, Ohio. Their mascot is the panther. They offer basketball, archery, cross country, football, volleyball, soccer, baseball, golf, wrestling, and softball teams. Their main athletic rival is Twin Valley South High School, based in West Alexandria, Ohio. Another rival being National Trail high school, based in New Paris, Ohio.
