= Amelia High School =

Former public high school in Batavia, Ohio

Location
- 1351 Clough Pike; Batavia, (Clermont County), Ohio 45103; United States
- Coordinates: 39°3′42″N 84°13′49″W

Information
- Type: Public, Coeducational high school
- Status: closed
- Closed: 2017
- School district: West Clermont local school district
- Superintendent: Keith Kline
- Principal: Stephanie Walker
- Grades: 9–12
- Colors: Royal Blue and White
- Athletics conference: Southern Buckeye Athletic/Academic Conference American
- Mascot: Baron
- Team name: Barons
- Rival: Glen Este High School
- Accreditation: North Central Association of Colleges and Schools
- Athletic Director: James Collins
- Website: http://www.westcler.org/ah

Amelia High School was a public high school in the West Clermont Local School District in Clermont County, Ohio. It had an average daily student enrollment of approximately 1,100 in 2012. It held an "excellent" rating from the Ohio Department of Education. Amelia and Glen Este high schools closed after the 2016–17 school year and were replaced by a newly built West Clermont High School. Amelia and Glen Este middle schools were consolidated into the West Clermont Middle School on the former Amelia High School/Middle School property.

== Small schools ==
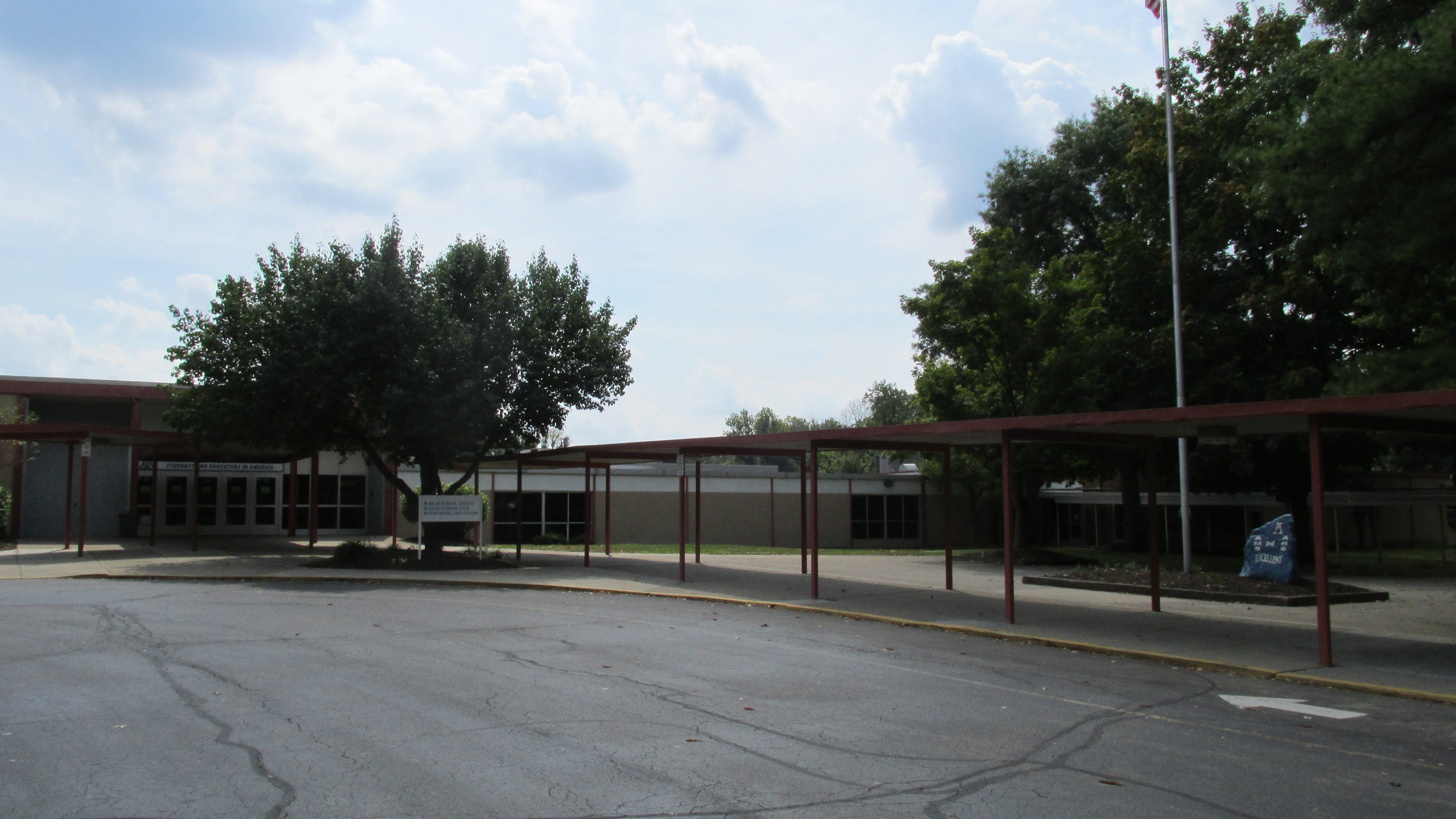
Amelia High School

Amelia High School had a variety of small schools that focused on areas of expertise or interest. Before budget cuts in the 2011–12 school year (due to state of Ohio budget cuts and school levy failures) Amelia High School was composed of the following small schools:

- Math and Science Technology Academy (cut 2011–12)
- International Baccalaureate (program still in place)
- World Studies School (cut 2011–12)
- Business and Technology School (cut 2011–12)
- Creative Arts and Design school (cut 2009–10)

== Clubs and activities ==
Amelia High School had a variety of clubs for its students to join. Among some of the most popular clubs were: Key Club, Business Professionals of America, student council, school newspaper and yearbook, choir, band, Gay Straight Transgender Alliance, and drama. Amelia High School also had varsity and junior varsity sports. Amelia's sports teams, known as the Barons, participated in the Fort Ancient Valley Conference from 1999 to 2010, when the school became a member of the Southern Buckeye Athletic/Academic Conference. Amelia won their only OHSAA team state championship in Baseball in 1950.

== Notable alumni ==
- Jonathan Good, professional wrestler better known by the names Jon Moxley and Dean Ambrose
- Joe Smith, baseball player
- David Taylor, member of the United States House of Representatives from Ohio's 2nd congressional district

== Sources ==
- West Clermont Local School District Website
