= Clinton-Massie High School =

School in Clinton County, Ohio, United States

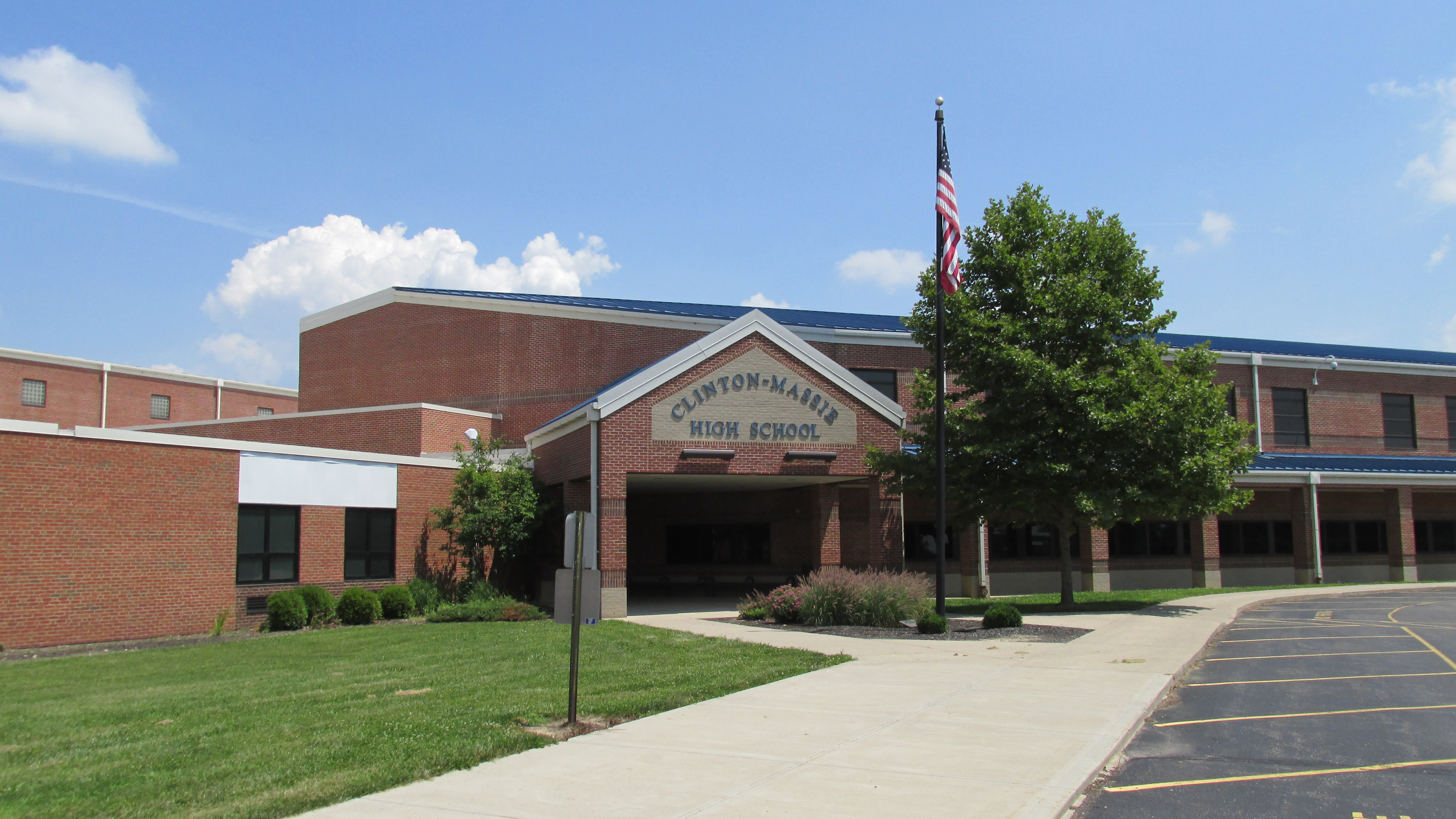

Location
- 2556 Lebanon Road; Clarksville, Clinton County, Ohio 45113; United States; 39°26′47″N 83°59′8″W

Information
- Other name: Clarksville Clinton-Massie
- School type: Public, Secondary school
- Status: Currently operational
- School district: Clinton-Massie Local School District
- NCES District ID: 3904639
- Superintendent: David Moss
- School number: 388 (OHSAA)
- CEEB code: 361190
- NCES School ID: 390463902540
- Principal: Aaron Seewer
- Teaching staff: 26.00 FTE
- Grades: 9^{th} through 12^{th}
- Gender: Coeducational
- Enrollment: 461 (2023-2024)
- Student to teacher ratio: 17.73
- Colors: Red, blue and white
- Athletics conference: Southern Buckeye Athletic/Academic Conference
- Sports: Baseball; Basketball; Bowling; Cross country; Football; Golf; Soccer; Softball; Swimming and diving; Tennis; Track and field; Volleyball; Wrestling; Lacrosse
- Team name: Falcons
- Website: www.cmfalcons.org
- Last updated: August 28, 2019

Clinton-Massie High School is a public high school near Clarksville, Ohio, in the United States, the only high school in the Clinton-Massie local school district. It was named for the county and township it was first located in when it originated as a consolidated school and assumed responsibility for the enrollment of four former schools: Adams Township, North Kingman, Clarksville (all in Clinton County) and Harveysburg (in Warren County). As of 2016 the school's enrollment by gender was 299 boys and 268 girls. It holds a rating of excellent with distinction. The school's superintendent is David Moss.

== Athletics ==
Clinton-Massie's athletic program, known as the Falcons, was a charter member of the Fort Ancient Valley Conference (FAVC) from 1964 until 1977. From 1977 until 2001, the school was part of the Kenton Trace Conference (KTC). From 2002 until 2004, it was a member of the Southern Buckeye Athletic/Academic Conference (SBAAC). The school then left in 2005 to join the South Central Ohio League (SCOL), but rejoined the SBAAC in the 2017 following the disbanding of the SCOL.

=== Ohio High School Athletic Association State Championships ===
- Football - 2012, 2013, 2021

== Notable alumni ==
- Chuck Cleaver, musician
- Cliff Rosenberger, Speaker of the Ohio House of Representatives from 2015 to 2018
