= Fairborn High School =

Public, coeducational high school in Fairborn, Ohio, United States

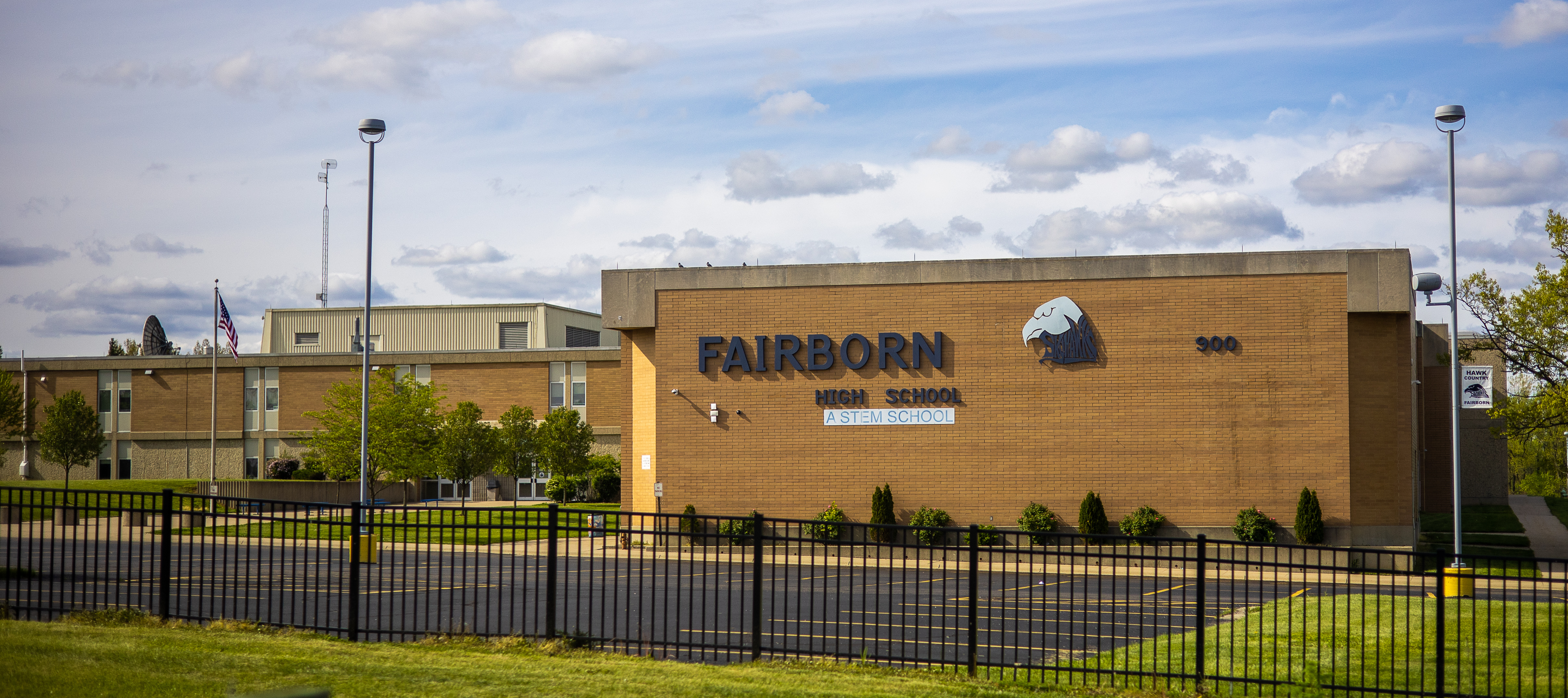

Location
- 1523 Commerce Blvd; Fairborn, (Greene County), Ohio 45324; United States
- Coordinates: 39°47′5″N 84°0′21″W

Information
- Type: Public, Coeducational high school
- Established: 2024
- School district: Fairborn City Schools
- Superintendent: Gene Lolli
- Principal: Karen Chicketti
- Grades: 9-12
- Colors: Navy Blue and Columbia Blue
- Athletics: MVL
- Athletics conference: Miami valley League
- Mascot: Blu
- Team name: Skyhawks
- Accreditation: North Central Association of Colleges and Schools
- Website: School website

Fairborn High School is a public high school for grades 9–12 in Fairborn, Ohio. It currently is the only high school in the Fairborn City Schools district. The mascot is the Skyhawk. The school has approximately 1,500 students, varying by school year. Many students from Wright-Patterson AFB attend the school, which has caused the attendance to fluctuate. As of 2019–20, Fairborn is a member of the Miami Valley League (MVL)

== History ==
The current Fairborn High School was built as Park Hills High School in the late 1960s. Fairborn Baker High School (now Baker Middle School) and Park Hills High School merged into Fairborn High School in 1982. Park Hills High School, known as the Vikings includes graduating classes from 1972 to 1982; school colors during this time were brown and gold. When Baker High School, known as the Flyers (whose colors were blue and gold) and Park Hills high school merged, the school colors also merged to become sky blue and brown (dropping the gold). In 1997 school colors changed from sky blue and brown to navy blue and Columbia blue.

== Notable alumni ==
- Kevin DeWine - politician, member of Ohio House of Representatives
- Gregory H. Johnson - NASA astronaut
- Chris Roetter - Vocalist of Like Moths to Flames and former Vocalist of Emarosa and Agraceful
- Michael J. Saylor - co-founder of MicroStrategy Incorporated
- Jackie Warner - fitness trainer

== Ohio High School Athletic Association State Championships ==
- Boys Golf – 1974*, 1988

*1974 title won by Fairborn Baker HS.
