= Franklin Monroe High School =

Location
- 8639 Oakes Road; Arcanum, Ohio, (Darke County), Ohio 45304; United States; 39°59′0″N 84°28′51″W

Information
- Type: Public, Coeducational high school
- Established: 1952
- School district: Franklin and Monroe Townships
- Superintendent: Jeremy Pequignot
- Principal: Diane Voress
- Grades: 7-12
- Colors: Blue and White
- Fight song: Wave the Flag
- Athletics conference: Western Ohio Athletic Conference
- Sports: Baseball, Basketball, Cross Country, Golf, Softball, Track and Volleyball.
- Mascot: Jet
- Nickname: Jets
- Team name: Jets
- Rival: Arcanum Trojans, Tri-Village Patriots
- Newspaper: Sonic Sound
- Website: http://www.franklin-monroe.k12.oh.us

Franklin Monroe High School is a public high school in Pitsburg, Ohio. It is the only high school in the Franklin Monroe School District. The school name is derived from the fact that it serves large portions of Franklin Township and Monroe Township in Darke County. Franklin Monroe began in 1952, when the Franklin and Monroe Township schools consolidated into one. The school is housed in one building on a property in Pitsburg, Ohio.
