= Madison High School (Middletown, Ohio) =

Madison Jr./Sr. High School
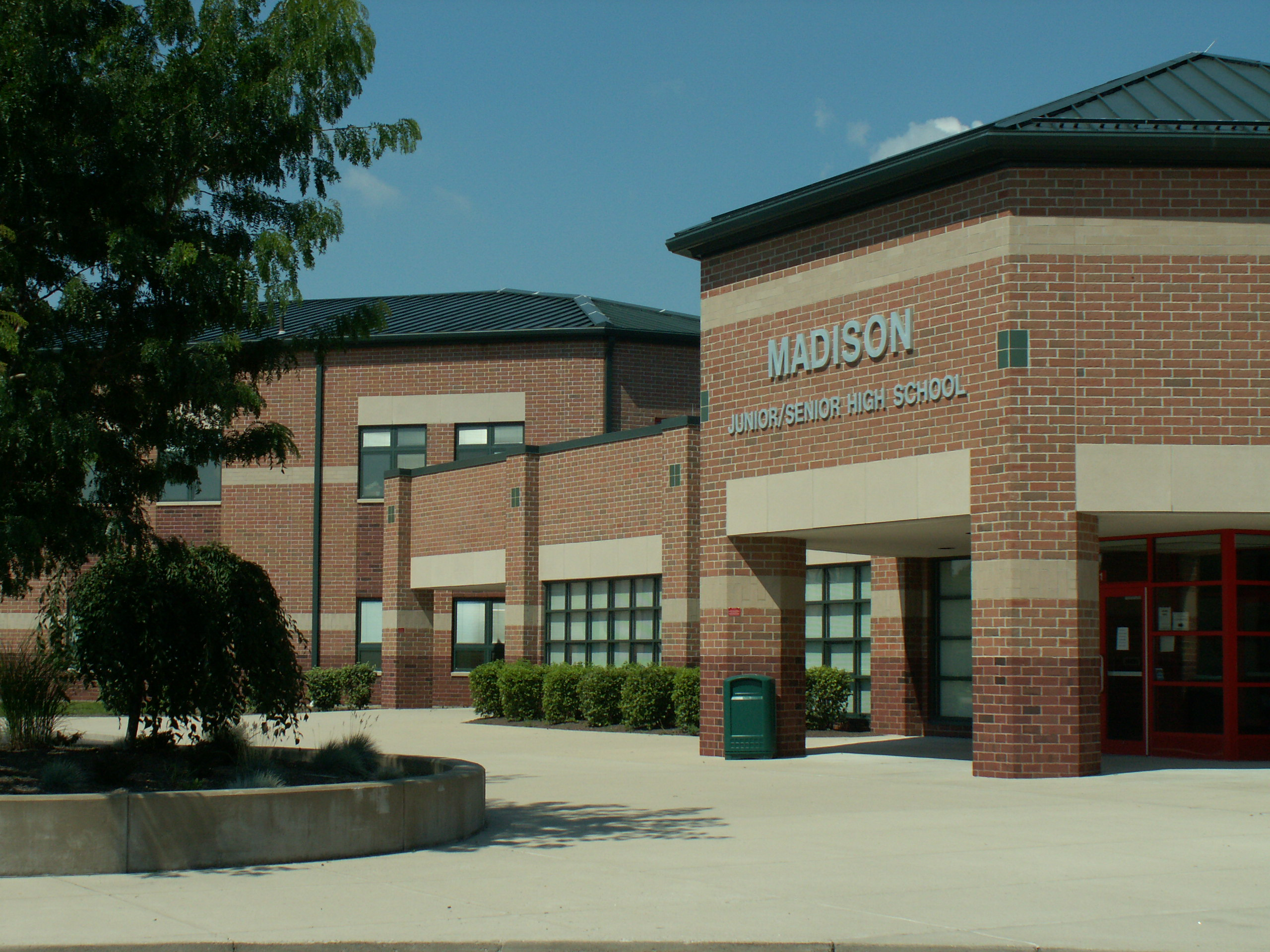
- Madison Jr./Sr. High School

Location
- 5797 West Alexandria Road; Middletown, Ohio (Madison Township) Middletown, (Butler County), Ohio 45042; United States
- 39°32′2″N 84°26′35″W

Information
- Type: Public, coeducational high school
- Motto: "Achieving excellence one student at a time!" & "It's good to be a Mohawk!"
- School district: Madison Local School District
- President: David French
- Administrator: Jeff Staggs
- Principal: Jason Jackson
- Grades: 9-12
- Colors: Red, black and white
- Athletics conference: Southwestern Buckeye League
- Sports: Baseball, softball, tennis, basketball, golf, track & field, cross country, football, soccer, wrestling, and marching band
- Mascot: Mohawk
- Team name: Mohawks
- Rival: Preble Shawnee Arrows, Carlisle Indians
- Accreditation: North Central Association of Colleges and Schools
- Website: www.madisonmohawks.org

Madison Junior-Senior High School is a public high school near Middletown, Ohio. It is the only high school in the Madison Local Schools district. The school colors are red, black and white.

Madison's sports teams, known as the Mohawks, participated in the Fort Ancient Valley Conference from 1979 until 1984, when the school left for the Southwestern Buckeye League's Buckeye Division, which consists of smaller schools.

== Shooting ==
On February 29, 2016, four students were injured during a shooting in the school's cafeteria when James "Austin" Hancock discharged seven rounds from a firearm. The shooter fled the scene, but was later arrested and charged as an adult with four counts of attempted murder and one count of inducing panic. On June 6, the shooter was sentenced to six years in juvenile detention. The victims' families later filed a lawsuit against him, his family, and the state, alleging that the shooter's parents entrusted him with the gun used in the shooting, and that the weapon was registered to another relative who failed to properly secure it.
