= Kings High School (Kings Mills, Ohio) =

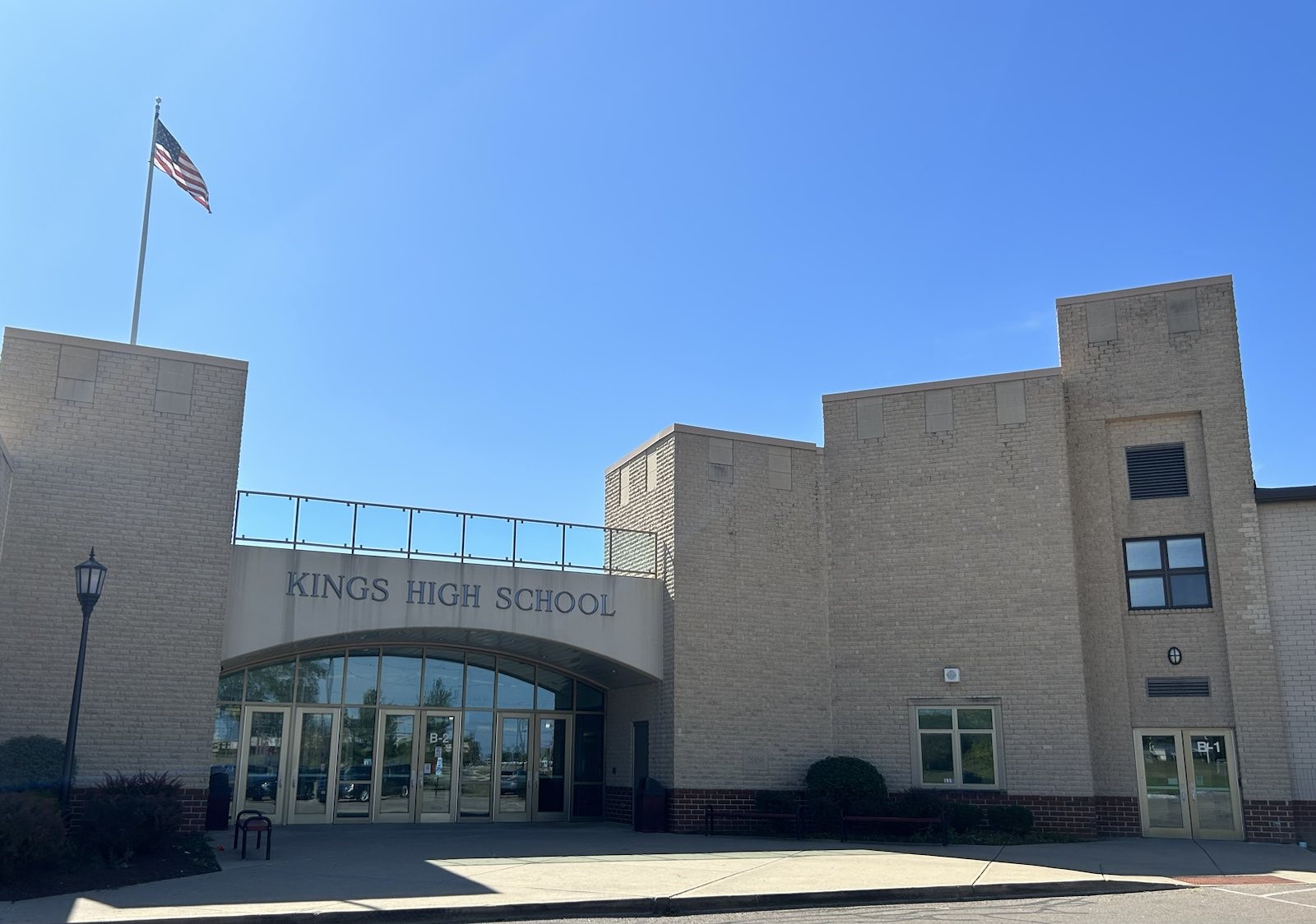

Location
- 5500 Columbia Road; Kings Mills, (Warren County), Ohio 45034; United States; 39°21′12″N 84°15′19″W

Information
- School type: Public, Coeducational
- School board: Stacie Belform, Deb Cowan, Peggy Phillips, Janelle Groff, John Skerl
- School district: Kings Local School District
- Superintendent: Greg Sears
- Principal: Justin Frost
- Teaching staff: 55.22 (FTE)
- Grades: 9–12
- Enrollment: 1,425 (2023-2024)
- Student to teacher ratio: 25.81
- Campus: 7–12
- Colors: red white and Columbia blue
- Athletics conference: Eastern Cincinnati Conference
- Mascot: The Knight
- Team name: Kings Knights
- Rival: Little Miami High School
- National ranking: 795 (2021)
- Newspaper: The Knight Times
- Yearbook: The Royal Guard
- Feeder schools: Kings Junior High School
- Website: www.kingslocal.net

Kings High School is a public high school in the unincorporated village of Kings Mills, Ohio in Deerfield Township, Warren County. It is the only high school in the Kings Local School District.

In 2018, the Kings High School principal faced criticism for using a racial slur during a staff meeting and in a conversation with a student.

== Athletics ==
The school's mascot is the Knight and its athletic teams compete in the Eastern Cincinnati Conference (ECC) as of the 2012–13 season. The Knights were previously charter members of the Fort Ancient Valley Conference (FAVC), in which they competed from 1965 to 2012.

=== Ohio High School Athletic Association state championships ===
- Girls' Volleyball – 2023, 2026
- Softball — 2026

== Notable alumni ==
- Keedy – musician
- Ron Maag – member of the Ohio House of Representatives
- Bryan Volpenhein – rower and 2004 Olympic Gold Medalist
