= Lebanon High School (Ohio) =

Location
- 1916 Drake Road; Lebanon, (Warren County), Ohio 45036; United States; 39°27′51″N 84°10′53″W

Information
- School type: Public, Coeducational
- Opened: 2004 (current building)
- School district: Lebanon City Schools
- Superintendent: Isaac Seevers
- Principal: Alex Brunk
- Teaching staff: 70.00 (FTE)
- Grades: 9–12
- Enrollment: 1,628 (2023-24)
- Student to teacher ratio: 23.64
- Colors: Maroon and White
- Fight song: Onward Lebanon
- Athletics conference: ECC
- Nickname: Warriors
- Rival: Springboro
- Accreditation: North Central Association of Colleges and Schools
- Newspaper: Team TV
- Yearbook: Trilobite
- Feeder schools: Lebanon Junior High School
- Website: www.lebanonschools.org

Lebanon High School is a public high school in Lebanon, Ohio. It is the only high school in the Lebanon City School District. Their mascot is the Warrior and the school logo is the letter "L" with a spear. The primary school colors are maroon and white, although throughout its history secondary colors have included black and maize.

The high school moved into its current building on 1916 Drake Road in 2004. From 1969 until 2004 it was housed in what was the Lebanon Junior High School on 160 Miller Road, now considered to be the District Performance Center. Prior to 1969, Lebanon High School called home what is now Berry Intermediate School on Oakwood Street.

== Ohio High School Athletic Association State Championships ==
- Football – 1998
- Girls Softball – 2025
- Brett Harrelson, actor
- Woody Harrelson (1979), actor
- Michael Larson, record-breaking contestant in the Press Your Luck scandal
- Casey Shaw (1994), basketball coach

== See also ==
- Lebanon City School District
- Lebanon, Ohio
