= Glen Este High School =

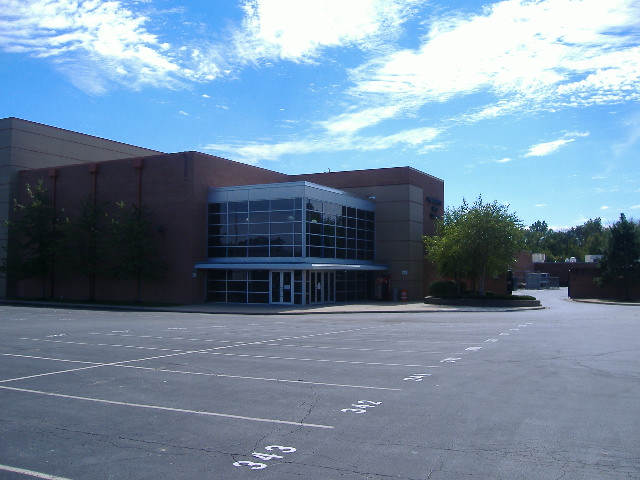

Location
- 4342 Glen Este-Withamsville Road; Cincinnati, (Clermont County), Ohio 45245; United States; 39°5′10″N 84°15′43″W

Information
- Type: Public, Coeducational high school
- Established: 1963
- Status: Closed
- Closed: 2017
- Superintendent: Keith Kline
- Principal: Dennis D. Ashworth
- Faculty: 69
- Grades: 9-12
- Colors: Purple and White
- Fight song: Trojans On Parade
- Athletics conference: Eastern Cincinnati Conference
- Mascot: Trojan
- Team name: Trojans
- Rival: Amelia High School
- Accreditation: North Central Association of Colleges and Schools
- Yearbook: The illiad
- Athletic Director: Dan Simmons
- Website: westcler.org/gh

Glen Este High School was a public high school in Glen Este outside Cincinnati, Ohio, United States. It was one of two high schools in the West Clermont Local School District, the other being Amelia High School. The four-year high school had an enrollment of approximately 1,200 students in grades 9–12 in 2012.

Glen Este High School was accredited by the Ohio Department of Education and the North Central Association of Colleges and Schools. The school was also a member of the Ohio Association of College Admissions Counselors and the National Association of College Admissions Counselors. It was one of the few schools in Greater Cincinnati that operated its own radio station, solely run by the students. Closed circuit radio KXKVO was organized as a club and operated from 1967 until 1972. In the fall of 2017 Glen Este merged with Amelia High School to become West Clermont High School.

In 2019, the school building was acquired by private education non-profit, Child Focus Inc., which reopened the school as the Carter Center for Educational Excellence, providing special education for the area.

== Notable alumni ==
- Keith Matthew Maupin, United States Army Staff Sergeant
- Jayhawk Owens, former professional baseball player
- Peyton Burdick, professional baseball player
