= Mississinawa Valley High School =

Public, coeducational high school in Union City, Ohio, United States

Location
- 10480 Staudt Road; Union City, (Darke County), Ohio 45390; United States
- Coordinates: 40°13′13″N 84°44′54″W

Information
- Type: Public, Coeducational high school
- Superintendent: Jeff Winchester
- Principal: Julia Reichert
- Teaching staff: 19.70 (FTE)
- Grades: 7-12
- Student to teacher ratio: 14.01
- Colors: Black and White
- Athletics conference: Western Ohio Athletic Conference
- Mascot: Blackhawk
- Team name: Blackhawks
- Rival: Ansonia High School
- Website: http://www.mississinawa.k12.oh.us

Mississinawa Valley High School is a public high school in Union City, Ohio. It is the only high school in the Mississinawa Valley Schools district.

== Notable alumni ==
- Curtis Enis - former running back for the Chicago Bears and Clopay employee.
- Chris Hawkey - Radio personality and musician
