= Tri-Village High School =

Location
- 315 South Main Street; New Madison, (Darke County), Ohio 45346; United States
- Coordinates: 39°57′52″N 84°42′38.62″W

Information
- Type: Public, Coeducational high school
- Superintendent: Josh Sagester
- Principal: Lee Morris
- Grades: 7-12
- Colors: Red, Blue and White
- Athletics conference: Western Ohio Athletic Conference
- Mascot: Patriot
- Team name: Patriots
- Yearbook: The Spirit
- Website: http://www.tri-village.k12.oh.us

Tri-Village High School is a public high school in New Madison, Ohio, the only one in the district. It is a consolidation of New Madison School District and the Westmont School District. The Tri-Village School District started with the 1972–73 school year. Prior to the consolidation between New Madison and Westmont to form Tri-Village, Westmont had been a consolidation between Hollansburg and Palestine. Due to community support for the school, it was renovated and expanded. The school is housed all on one campus. The school announced in 2015 that it will add football as a school sport.

== Boys Basketball ==
In 1954, Westmont's boys basketball team participated in the OHSAA Boys "Class B" Final Four in Cleveland.

In 1991, the Tri-Village boys basketball team finished as Division IV state runners-up, losing to St. Henry.

In 2014, the boys team participated in the OHSAA Boys Division IV Final Four in Columbus, Ohio, losing to Convoy Crestview. The following season, Tri-Village returned to the state Final Four. They defeated New Philadelphia Tuscarawas Central Catholic, 55–47, giving the Patriots their second state championship game berth. Within the 2015 OHSAA Division IV Boys Basketball State Championship, they then triumphed over Canal Winchester Harvest Preparatory School, 48–46, winning on a made shot by Colton Linkous with 3.3 seconds remaining in the game. The team finished with a perfect 30–0 season, and the school's first state championship title.

== Ohio High School Athletic Association State Championships ==
- Boys Basketball – 2015
- Girls Basketball – 2023
- Girls Softball – 2025

== Notable alumni ==
- Clayton Murphy—2016 Olympic Bronze Medalist (Athletics, 800-meter run)
