= Bradford High School (Ohio) =

Location
- 760 Railroad Ave. Bradford, (Darke County), Ohio 45308; United States
- Coordinates: 40°08′28.7″N 84°25′57.9″W

Information
- Type: Public, Coeducational high school
- School district: Bradford Exempted Village Schools
- Superintendent: Joe Hurst
- Principal: Chris Barr
- Staff: 17.30 (FTE)
- Grades: 6-12
- Student to teacher ratio: 14.10
- Color
- Athletics conference: Western Ohio Athletic Conference
- Team name: Railroaders
- Website: http://www.bradford.k12.oh.us

Bradford High School is a public high school in Bradford, Ohio. It is the only high school in the Bradford Exempted Village Schools district.

Bradford's fight song is sung to the march, "Our Director."

== OHSAA (Ohio High School Athletic Association) State Championships ==
- 2021 Girls Softball
