= Twin Valley South High School =

Twin Valley High School

Location
- 100 Education Drive; West Alexandria, (Preble County), Ohio 45381; United States; 39°44′50″N 84°32′14″W

Information
- Type: Public, Coeducational high school
- School district: Twin Valley Community Local Schools
- Superintendent: Scott Cottingim
- Principal: Doug Dunham
- Teaching staff: 13.33 (FTE)
- Grades: 9-12
- Student to teacher ratio: 15.60
- Colors: Scarlet and Gray
- Athletics conference: Western Ohio Athletic Conference
- Team name: Panthers
- Athletic Director: Braxston Campbell
- Website: http://www.tvs.k12.oh.us/

Twin Valley South High School is a public high school in West Alexandria, Ohio. It is the only high school in the Twin Valley Community Local School District. The school colors are scarlet and gray, and the mascot is the Panthers. Their main rival is Tri-County High School, located in Lewisburg, Ohio.

== Athletics ==
School sports include football, cross country, golf, boys and girls basketball, baseball, softball, volleyball, wrestling, co-ed track, and marching band.

=== Ohio High School Athletic Association State Championships ===
- Boys Track and Field – 1959*

* Title won by West Alexandria High School prior to consolidation into Twin Valley South.
