= West Clermont Local School District =

School district in Ohio, United States

Address
- 4350 Aicholtz Road Cincinnati, Ohio, 45245; United States

District information
- Type: Public
- Grades: PK–12
- Superintendent: Dr.David Fultz
- Schools: 9
- NCES District ID: 3904635

Students and staff
- Students: 7,651 (2025–2026)
- Teachers: 430.50 (on an FTE basis) (2025–2026)
- Staff: 862.41 (on an FTE basis) (2025–2026)
- Student–teacher ratio: 17.77 (2025–2026)

Other information
- Website: www.westcler.org

The West Clermont Local School District (WCLSD) is a public school district in Clermont County, Ohio, United States. It covers a 54-square-mile (140 km^{2}) area on the east side of the Cincinnati metropolitan area, centered on the east side of the I-275 loop. The district serves much of Union Township, as well as portions of Batavia, Monroe, Ohio and Pierce Townships.

The West Clermont Local School District is the 23rd largest of Ohio's 610 school districts, with 8500 students in grades Pre-K-12, with 453 certified staff members and 260 support personnel. The district has seven elementary schools, one middle school, and one high school.

93% of students in WCLSD graduate from high school with a diploma. Out of 8027 students, 38.1% are on free or reduced lunch programs. The student to teacher ratio in WCLSD is higher than the national average, at 20:1. The average per-student spending is $9,110, compared to the national average of $12,239.

== Area ==
It includes the former municipality of Amelia.

== High schools ==
WCLSD originally included two high schools, Amelia High School and Glen Este High School. As of August 30, 2017, the district now serves only one high school, West Clermont High School. Built with a local government and school district partnership and help from the Ohio Facilities Construction Commission, this state-of-the-art building serves over 2400 students.

== Middle schools ==
WCLSD originally included two middle schools, Amelia Middle School and Glen Este Middle School. As of August 30, 2017, the district now serves only one, West Clermont Middle School. This combined the students of the two former schools on the former Amelia High and Middle campus. Modifications to the area around the former Amelia Middle and High Schools conjoined the two schools. In Summer of 2018, the Inside of WCMS was renovated to included new signs for the North and South Campuses of the School. Hall signs were also added. Both the middle and high schools are called (Wcms) and (Wchs). The school is renowned for its extensive grounds and large student body.

== Elementary schools ==
WCLSD includes seven elementary schools: Amelia Elementary School, Clough Pike Elementary School, Holly Hill Elementary School, Merwin Elementary School, Summerside Elementary School, Willowville Elementary School, and Withamsville-Tobasco Elementary School. Brantner Elementary School was closed at the end of the 2018–2019 school year and has since been demolished. Clough Pike Elementary opened a refurbished school in the fall of 2020.
