= William Henry Harrison High School (Ohio) =

Location
- 9860 West Road; Harrison, (Hamilton County), Ohio 45030; United States; 39°15′19″N 84°46′11″W

Information
- Type: Public, Coeducational high school
- School district: Southwest Local School District
- Superintendent: John Hamstra
- Principal: Joseph W. Pollitt
- Teaching staff: 42.78 (on an FTE basis)
- Grades: 9-12
- Enrollment: 1,186 (2023–2024)
- Average class size: 35
- Student to teacher ratio: 27.72
- Campus: Suburban
- Campus size: Small
- Colors: Green and White
- Fight song: The Harrison Victory March (to the Notre Dame Victory March)
- Athletics conference: Southwest Ohio Conference
- Team name: Wildcats
- Accreditation: North Central Association of Colleges and Schools
- Website: School Homepage

William Henry Harrison High School (also known as Harrison High School) is a public senior high school located in Harrison, Ohio. It is the only high school in the Southwest Local School District and serves as the high school for students located in Harrison Township, Crosby Township, and Whitewater Township in Hamilton County as well as a small section of Morgan Township in southwest Butler County.

== Athletics ==
The Harrison Wildcats compete in the Southwest Ohio Conference (SWOC) of the Ohio High School Athletic Association. Harrison is a AAA school. Harrison won its first team state championship in school history, claiming the inaugural girls' wrestling championship in 2023.

== Notable alumni ==
- Rich Franklin (UFC)
- Robert Conley (Music Producer)
