= Andy Reid (running back) =

American football player (born 1954)

- Reid in 1977

No. 33
- Position: Running back

Personal information
- Born: February 26, 1954 (age 72); Hamilton, Ohio, U.S.
- Listed height: 6 ft 0 in (1.83 m)
- Listed weight: 194 lb (88 kg)

Career information
- High school: Taft (Hamilton)
- College: Georgia
- NFL draft: 1976: 13th round, 349th overall pick

Career history
- Seattle Seahawks (1976)*; Buffalo Bills (1976)
- * Offseason or practice squad member only

Career NFL statistics
- Games played: 1
- Starts: 0
- Stats at Pro Football Reference

Andrew Barton Reid (born February 26, 1954) is an American former professional football player who was a running back for one game with the Buffalo Bills of the National Football League (NFL). He played college football for the Georgia Bulldogs, rushing 160 times for 837 yards and five touchdowns.

== Biography ==
Andy Reid was born February 26, 1954, in Hamilton, Ohio. He attended Robert A. Taft High School in that city. Reid played baseball and football in high school, starring as a halfback for the Tigers.

The son of former University of Georgia and Green Bay Packers player Floyd "Breezy" Reid, Andy followed in his father's footsteps as a Georgia Bulldog. There he was a three year letterman and regular in the lineup during his junior and senior seasons. During his senior year he gained 468 yards on 83 carries — an impressive average of 5.6 yards per carry — and scored three touchdowns.

During his three years running the ball for the Bulldogs, Reid gained a total of 837 yards on 160 carries. He appeared with his team in three consecutive post-season bowl games — the Cotton Bowl, Tangerine Bowl, and Peach Bowl, respectively.
