= David Shaw (musician) =

American singer-songwriter

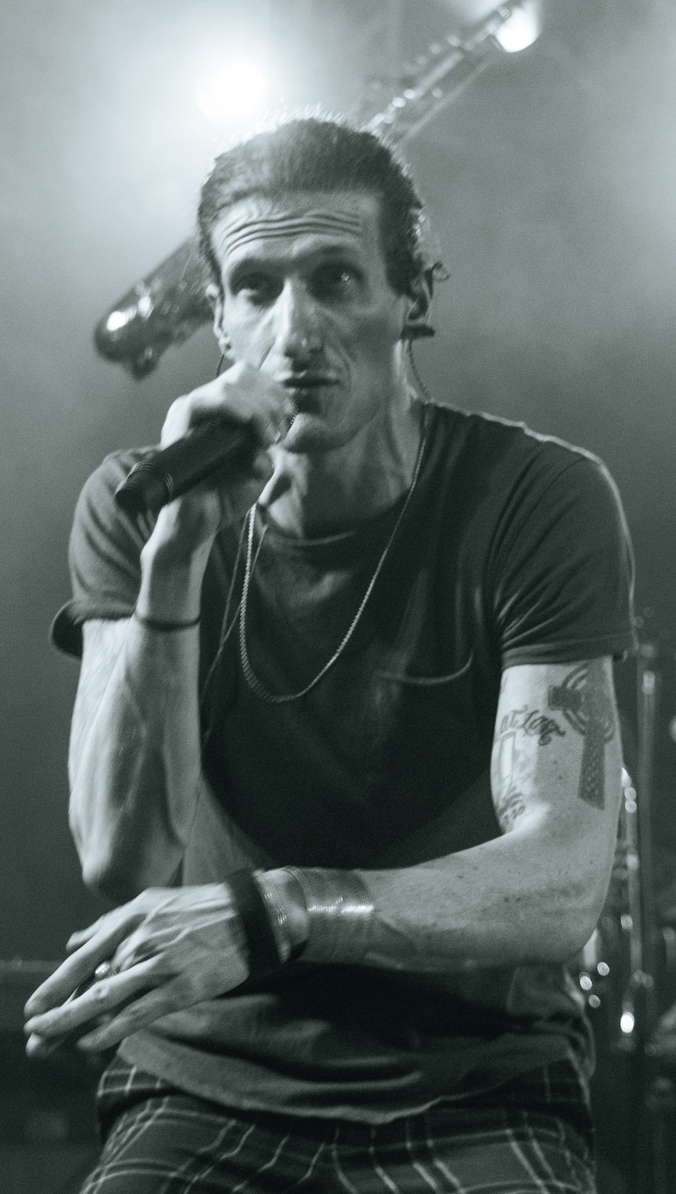
- Shaw in 2018

Background information
- Born: David William Shaw; June 6, 1983 (age 43); Hamilton, Ohio, U.S.
- Genres: Rock
- Occupations: Singer; songwriter
- Years active: 2007–present
- Labels: Yokoko; C3
- Member of: The Revivalists
- Website: www.davidshaw.com

David William Shaw is an American singer, songwriter, producer, and instrumentalist. He is a member of the rock band The Revivalists, who have released four albums, two EPs, and had a No. 1 Adult Alternative single, "Wish I Knew You".

Shaw's eponymous solo album was released in May 2021, accompanied by five singles, "Got Me Feeling Good," "Heavy Soul," "Shivers," "Shaken," and "Promised Land". The release was followed by his solo tour.

== Early life ==
David William Shaw was born in Hamilton, Ohio. After graduating from Hamilton High School in 2001, he attended Miami University Hamilton and Columbus State Community College, ending his studies at Ohio State University where he earned a degree in business management with an emphasis in construction management. Shaw moved to New Orleans, Louisiana after he graduated.

Two weeks after moving to New Orleans, he was playing his original song, "Purple Heart" on his acoustic guitar while sitting on his porch when Zack Feinberg rode by on his bicycle. The two met, then ended up forming The Revivalists.

== The Revivalists ==
Shaw and Feinberg formed The Revivalists in 2007, recruiting first drummer Andrew Campanelli, then later adding bassist George Gekas, pedal steel guitarist Ed Williams, and saxophonist Rob Ingraham. Keyboardist and trumpeter Michael Girardot joined the band in 2012, and drummer and percussionist PJ Howard in 2017.

With The Revivalists, Shaw has recorded five full-length albums: Vital Signs in 2010, City of Sound in 2014, Men Amongst Mountains in 2015, Take Good Care in 2018, and Pour It Out Into The Night in 2023. The band's breakout single, "Wish I Knew You" from Men Amongst Mountains, went to No. 1 on Billboard's Adult Alternative and Alternative radio charts in 2016, and sold over one million copies. The Revivalists have also released two EPs: The Revivalists in 2008, and Made in Muscle Shoals in 2020.

== Solo career ==
In a 2021 interview, Shaw told ABC Audio that over the years with The Revivalists, he had written songs that he decided were not right for the band; material that was more personal and stripped down to only his voice and a guitar. As a result, he recorded a solo album with some of these songs called David Shaw. The album, which has rock, country and soul influences, was released in May 2021 on Yokoko Records/C3 Records, just before Shaw rejoined The Revivalists for the first full band tour since the beginning of the 2020 COVID-19 pandemic.

Joining Shaw on his debut solo album are guitarist and co-writer Chris Gelbuda, keyboardist and vocalist Neal Francis, bassist Mike Starr, and one of The Revivalists' current drummers, PJ Howard. They recorded the project at New Orleans’ Parlor Recording Studio. A number of singles were released to promote David Shaw. These include "Got Me Feeling Good," "Heavy Soul," "Shivers," "Shaken," and "Promised Land," and the album was produced by four-time Grammy Award-winning producer Jack Splash.

Just after the release of the album, Shaw began his first solo tour.

Around the time of the David Shaw release, he created a weekly, five-show livestream series of his material both solo and with The Revivalists. He also performed songs from the album on NPR's World Cafe program, and a live show on Rolling Stone magazine's section of the Twitch channel.

== Philanthropy ==
As a member of The Revivalists, Shaw joined his bandmates in the creation of a charity called Rev Causes. The organization supports the National Alliance on Mental Illness, Upturn Arts, Everytown for Gun Safety, and Songs for Kids Foundation, among others. He produces an annual concert in his hometown, called Big River Get Down, which benefits Hamilton, Ohio.

== Music videos ==
Title	Year	Director
"Shaken"	September 2020	Kevin Johnson
"Got Me Feeling Good"	April 2021	Laine Kelly
