= Get It Honest =

Studio album by the Revivalists
- Released: July 24, 2026
- Length: 42:58
- Label: Concord
- Producer: Rich Costey

The Revivalists chronology
Pour It Out into the Night (2023)	Get It Honest (2026)

Get It Honest is the sixth studio album by the American rock band the Revivalists. It was released on July 24, 2026, by Concord Records.

== Background and recording ==
The Revivalists recorded Get It Honest at the Guilford Sound studios in Vermont; it was produced by Rich Costey, who produced the band's previous album Pour It Out into the Night (2023). In an interview with People following the album's release, frontman David Shaw revealed that he wrote music for the album before and following the birth of his now 2-year-old daughter Tedi.

== Promotion ==
Get It Honest was supported by the release of four singles. The album's lead single, "Heart Stop", was released on April 15, 2026. It was accompanied by the release of a music video directed by Caroline Iaffaldono, which was shot on a first-person view helmet camera in New Orleans. The second single, "Razorblades and Runaways", was released on May 15, 2026. The third single, the album's title track, was released on June 12, 2026. The fourth and final single, "Lost and Found", was released on July 22, 2026.

== Track listing ==
Get It Honest track listing
No.	Title	Writer(s)	Length
1.	"Heart Stop"	David William Shaw; PJ Howard; Andrew Yanovski	4:19
2.	"Lost and Found"	Shaw; Chris Gelbuda	3:24
3.	"Get It Honest"	Shaw	3:24
4.	"Blood on the River"	Shaw	3:30
5.	"Razorblades and Runaways"	Shaw; Eric Krasno	3:33
6.	"Love's the Only Thing"	Shaw	3:40
7.	"Holy"	Shaw; Yanovski	3:36
8.	"Bad Bad Bad"	Zack Feinberg	3:56
9.	"The World Is Not Enough"	Andrew Campanelli	4:07
10.	"As of Now"	Shaw; Campanelli; Rob Ingraham	3:35
11.	"Nobody"	Shaw; Campanelli	2:53
12.	"Lay It on Me"	Shaw; Feinberg	3:01
Total length:			42:58

== Personnel ==
Credits are adapted from Tidal.

=== The Revivalists ===
- Andrew Campanelli – percussion (tracks 1, 3–6, 12), drums (2, 3, 5, 7–11), banjo (6), background vocals (7)
- Zack Feinberg – electric guitar (1–3, 5–7, 9–12), 12-string acoustic guitar (2, 3, 6, 11), acoustic guitar (2, 4, 7, 8, 10), banjo (3, 10), percussion (9); drums, co-production (12)
- George Gekas – bass guitar
- Michael Girardot – keyboards (all tracks), trumpet (3, 7, 11), background vocals (4–10), vocals (11, 12)
- PJ Howard – drums (1, 3, 4, 6, 7), percussion (2, 5, 8–10), background vocals (2, 7, 9, 10), chimes (12)
- Rob Ingraham – saxophone (1, 3, 4, 6–8, 10–12), flute (3, 5, 9), background vocals (4–8, 10, 11), whistle (4)
- David Shaw – vocals, co-production (all tracks); background vocals (1–7, 11, 12), acoustic guitar (1, 3–7, 10–12), electric guitar (1), drum programming (3, 7), 12-string acoustic guitar (3), whistle (4), nylon-string guitar (9)
- Ed Williams – pedal steel guitar (all tracks), Dobro guitar (2, 7, 10–12)

=== Additional contributors ===
- Rich Costey – production, mixing (all tracks); drum programming (9)
- Jeff Citron – engineering
- Howie Weinberg – mastering
- Andriu Yanovski – background vocals, synthesizer (1)
- Mike Dillon – percussion (7)
- Davide Rossi – strings (9)
