= The Revivalists =

American rock band

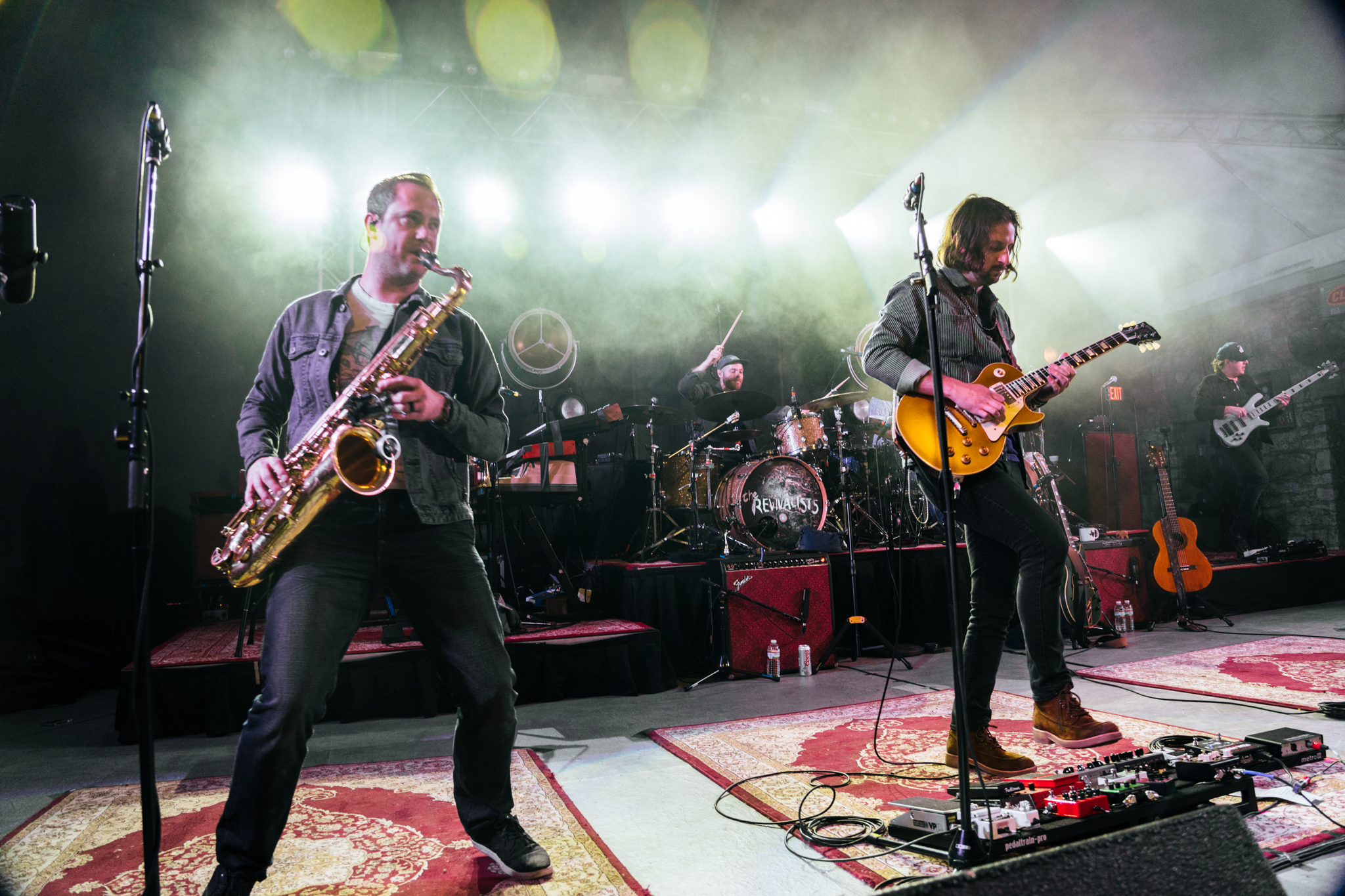
- The Revivalists, 2018

Background information
- Origin: New Orleans, Louisiana, U.S.
- Genres: Alternative rock; roots rock
- Years active: 2007–present
- Labels: Concord; Loma Vista Recordings; Washington Square; Wind-up
- Members: David Shaw; Zack Feinberg; Ed Williams; Rob Ingraham; George Gekas; Andrew Campanelli; Michael Girardot; Paulet "PJ" Howard
- Website: therevivalists.com

The Revivalists are an American rock band formed in New Orleans, Louisiana, in 2007. The eight-piece band consists of Ed Williams (pedal steel guitar, guitar), David Shaw (lead vocals), Zack Feinberg (guitar), Rob Ingraham (saxophone), George Gekas (bass guitar), Andrew Campanelli (drums and percussion), Michael Girardot (keyboards and trumpet), and Paulet "PJ" Howard (drums and percussion).

After The Revivalists released their album, Men Amongst Mountains, on July 17, 2015, they were named by Rolling Stone magazine as one of "10 Bands You Need to Know". In September 2016, their song "Wish I Knew You" reached No. 1 on the Billboard Adult Alternative Songs chart, and in May 2017, the song reached No. 1 on the Alternative Songs chart. On September 11, the single was certified platinum by the RIAA.

A 2018 single, "All My Friends," from their album, Take Good Care, went to No.1 at Adult Alternative radio.

== History ==
=== Early history ===
The Revivalists began when guitarist Zack Feinberg met vocalist/lyricist David Shaw as a young man riding his bike on a different route from usual, and rode past Shaw, recently transplanted from Hamilton, Ohio. Feinberg grew up outside New York City and has immersed himself in the jam band and funk scenes. The two struck up a conversation and got together to play music. The duo began playing with Andrew Campanelli, a drummer Feinberg had met at Tipitina's. Within a week, the earliest version of the band, now named The Revivalists, played their first show at Checkpoint Charlie's Laundromat/Bar on Esplanade Avenue. They began regular jam sessions at Tipitina's. The Revivalists, now including Feinberg, Shaw, Campanelli, Ed Williams (pedal steel guitarist), Rob Ingraham (saxophonist) and George Gekas (bassist), and occasionally Michael Girardot (keyboardist/trumpeter), went on to play an average of 150 dates a year.

=== The Revivalists EP, Vital Signs ===
The Revivalists released their first few records independently. This included the self-titled EP on May 15, 2008, which was named one of the best albums of 2008 by WWOZ New Orleans DJ Sherwood Collins.

Their debut album, Vital Signs, came out on March 3, 2010, and was produced by engineer Chris Finney. The New Orleans Times Picayune said the music had "irresistible hooks, melodies and arrangements."

The band spent the time between the release of the EP and after the release of Vital Signs touring the US.

=== City of Sound ===
The Revivalists' second album, City of Sound was self-released in 2012 and re-released on March 4, 2014, by Wind-up Records, with a second disc containing over an hour of live tracks. On City of Sound, the band expanded their sound toward folk, pop, and soul.

Singles from this album included "Criminal", "Upright", and "Navigate Below", and it was produced by Galactic saxophonist Ben Ellman.

In June 2013, The Revivalists appeared at New York City's Governors Ball, among other festivals.

=== Men Amongst Mountains ===
The Revivalists' third album, Men Amongst Mountains, also produced by Ben Ellman of Galactic was released on July 17, 2015. In March 2016, the band was picked as Elvis Duran's Artist of the Month on NBC's Today show hosted by Kathie Lee Gifford and Hoda Kotb and broadcast nationally performing their single "Wish I Knew You".

The single, "Wish I Knew You" went to #1 on Billboard's Adult Alternative and Alternative radio charts, and remained on the Billboard Hot 100 for nine weeks. The song was certified platinum by the RIAA, and Forbes magazine called it: "one of the best and catchiest radio singles of the year".

The Revivalists made performances on Jimmy Kimmel Live!, Ellen, and Conan. Rolling Stone touted them among “10 Artists You Need To Know,” and they received a Billboard Music Award nomination for Top Rock Song and as well as nominations for Alternative Rock Song of the Year and Best New Rock/Alternative Rock Artist at the iHeartRadio Music Awards.

Men Amongst Mountains received more than 2 million streams on Spotify, and ended up in the Top 5 of the Billboard Heatseekers chart.

During this period, The Revivalists played New York City's Central Park SummerStage as well as Austin City Limits, New Orleans Jazz Fest (opening for Dave Matthews), Outside Lands, KROQ Weenie Roast & Fiesta, and more.

Two months after the death of David Bowie, The Revivalists premiered their tribute to the late artist in the song they wrote called "Bowie" featuring a verse sung by saxophonist Ingraham.

In late 2017, Paulet "PJ" Howard was added to the line-up on drums and percussion.

The band has a partnership with NOLA Brewing Company for The Revivalists American Pale Ale. The artisanal beer debuted during the band's annual New Year's Eve residency at The Orpheum Theater in New Orleans and followed through their distribution center shortly after. A portion of the proceeds benefits The Roots of Music Foundation.

=== Take Good Care ===
In August 2018, "All My Friends" was released as the first single from The Revivalists' fourth studio album, Take Good Care, and later went to No. 1 on the Adult Alternative radio chart at Billboard. The album, released November 9, 2018, is the band's first release with the indie label Loma Vista Recordings. For the first time, The Revivalists recorded and co-wrote with multiple producers and writers, enlisting the talents of Dave Cobb (Sturgill Simpson, Chris Stapleton), Andrew Dawson (Kanye West, Fun., Sleigh Bells), and Dave Bassett (Elle King, Vance Joy) for sessions Nashville's RCA Studio B. Additionally, it would be the first record with drummer/percussionist PJ Howard joining the band in the studio.

=== Pour It Out into the Night ===
In February 2023, "Kid” was released as the first single from The Revivalists' fifth studio album, Pour It Out into the Night. The full album was released on June 2, 2023.

The Revivalists continue to tour, with shows sometimes four hours at a time with a tour schedule that includes Bonnaroo, Voodoo Music & Arts Experience, and Music Midtown.

== Philanthropy ==
Over the years, The Revivalists have made efforts to raise money to help various causes. Feinberg, Gekas and Ingraham joined members of Naughty Professor and Cardinal Sons as well as RumpelSTEELskin at The Howlin' Wolf in New Orleans for a show that contributed financial support to Emily's Entourage, a non-profit dedicated to finding a cure for cystic fibrosis.

The group also worked with the Roots of Music, an after-school music and tutoring program for over 150 local children. One of the fundraisers included The Roots of Music presents Band Together, a concert with many of the kids and local bands including The Revivalists. The band also donated money from some of their own shows to the program.

In the fall of 2019, The Revivalists established Rev Causes. Rev Causes is a fund that supports the essential work of organizations dedicated to reviving and investing in their communities, health, and our environment. By donating a portion of ticket sales, and through fan donations and a variety of fundraising efforts, Rev Causes aims to assist these organizations in building a better future. Organizations include The Center for Disaster Philanthropy (CDP), Everytown for Gun Safety, National Alliance on Mental Illness (NAMI), Songs for Kids Foundation, and Upturn Arts.

== Awards and honors ==
=== OffBeat's Best of the Beat Awards ===
Year	Category	Nominated work	Result	Ref.
2012	Best Rock Band or Performer		Won	
2012	Best Rock Album	City of Sound	Won	
2012	Best Music Video	"Criminal" (with Tyler Yee)	Won	
2015	Best Rock Band or Performer		Won	
2015	Best Rock Album	Men Amongst Mountains	Won	
2016	Artist of the Year		Won	
2016	Song of the Year	"Wish I Knew You" (awarded to David Shaw and Zack Feinberg)	Won	
2016	Best Rock Band or Performer		Won	
2016	Best Music Video	"Wish I Knew You" (with Mikey Cosention and Sam Green)	Won	
2017	Best Rock Band or Performer		Won	
2018	Best Rock Band or Performer		Won	
2018	Best Rock Album	Take Good Care	Won	
2018	Best Music Video	"All My Friends"	Won	
2020	Best Rock/Roots Rock Artist		Won	
2020	Best Rock/Roots Rock Artist Album	Made in Muscle Shoals	Won	
2023	Best Rock Artist		Won	
2023	Best Rock Album	Pour It Out into the Night	Won	

== Discography ==
=== Studio albums ===
Title	Details	Peak chart positions				Certifications
Title	Details	US	US Alt.	US Indie	US Rock	Certifications
Vital Signs	Released: March 3, 2010; Label: Self-released; Formats: CD, digital download	—	—	—	—	
City of Sound	Released: March 4, 2014; Label: Wind-up; Formats: CD, digital download	—	—	—	—	
Men Amongst Mountains	Released: July 17, 2015; Label: Wind-up; Formats: LP, CD, digital download	— (Note: Men Amongst Mountains did not enter the US Billboard 200, but peaked at number 4 on the US Heatseekers Albums Chart.)	18	15	23	RIAA: Gold
Take Good Care	Released: November 9, 2018; Label: Loma Vista	78	9	—	11	
Pour It Out into the Night	Released: June 2, 2023; Label: Concord; Formats: LP, CD, digital download	— (Note: Pour It Out into the Night did not enter the US Billboard 200, but peaked at number 57 on the Top Album Sales Chart.)	—	—	—	
Get It Honest	Released: July 24, 2026; Label: Concord; Formats: LP, CD, digital download	—	—	—	—	
"—" denotes a recording that did not chart or was not released in that territory.

=== EPs ===
Title	Details
The Revivalists	Released: August 7, 2008; Label: Self-released; Formats: CD, digital download
Made In Muscle Shoals	Released: January 30, 2020; Label: Loma Vista; Formats: CD, digital download
Made In Muscle Shoals Vol. 2	Released: June 17, 2022; Label: Concord; Formats: CD, digital download

=== Singles ===
Title	Year	Peak chart positions										Certifications	Album
Title	Year	US	US AAA	US Adult	US Rock	CAN AC	CAN Rock	CZ Rock	GRE	ICE	NLD	Certifications	Album
"Criminal"	2014	—	—	—	—	—	—	—	—	—	—		City of Sound
"Upright"	2014	—	—	—	—	—	—	—	—	—	—		City of Sound
"Navigate Below"	2014	—	—	—	—	—	—	—	—	—	—		City of Sound
"Keep Going"	2015	—	29	—	—	—	—	—	—	—	—		Men Amongst Mountains
"Wish I Knew You"	2016	84	1	14	5	35	5	10	6	9	—	RIAA: 3× Platinum; MC: Platinum	Men Amongst Mountains
"All My Friends"	2018	—	1	30	13	—	23	—	—	12	29		Take Good Care
"You and I"	2018	—	—	—	—	—	—	—	—	—	—		Take Good Care
"Change"	2018	—	2	—	39	—	46	—	—	—	—		Take Good Care
"Oh No"	2019	—	24	—	—	—	—	—	—	—	—		Made In Muscle Shoals
"Kid"	2023	—	1	—	48	45	5	—	—	—	—		Pour It Out into the Night
"The Long Con"	2023	—	—	—	—	—	—	—	—	—	—		Pour It Out into the Night
"Down in the Dirt"	2023	—	—	—	—	—	—	—	—	—	—		Pour It Out into the Night
"Don’t Look Back"	2023	—	—	—	—	—	—	—	—	—	—		Pour It Out into the Night
"Good Old Days" (solo or featuring The Head and the Heart)	2023	—	1	—	— (Note: "Good Old Days" did not enter the Rock Songs chart, but peaked at number 27 on the Rock & Alternative Airplay chart.)	—	35	—	—	—	—		Pour It Out into the Night
"Zombie (Wild Coming Out)"	2024	—	—	—	—	—	—	—	—	—	—		Non-album single
"Heart Stop"	2026	—	1	—	— (Note: "Heart Stop" did not enter the Rock Songs chart, but peaked at number 17 on the Rock & Alternative Airplay chart.)	—	27	13	—	—	—		Get It Honest
"—" denotes a single that did not chart or was not released in that territory.

=== Music videos ===
Title	Year	Director(s)
"Criminal"	2012	Tyler Yee
"Chase's House"	2012	
"BTBD"	2015	Destyn Patera
"Wish I Knew You"	2016	The Rite Brothers
"Change"	2019	Zev Deans
"Heart Stop"	2026	Caroline Iaffaldano

== Notable appearances ==
=== Red Rocks ===
In 2019, the band sold out Red Rocks Amphitheatre and followed up with two shows in 2021.

=== No Regrets Tour (Rolling Stones) ===
The Revivalists served as the opening act for the Jacksonville, Florida show, as well as the restart of the Rolling Stones' No Regrets Tour at the Dome @ America's Center St Louis, Missouri.
