= Jane Wilson (disambiguation) =

Jane Wilson (1924–2015) was an American painter.

Jane Wilson may also refer to:

- Jane Delaplaine Wilson (1830–1915), author
- Jane Bartle-Wilson (born 1951), English equestrian
- Jane Wilson-Howarth (born 1954), British author
- Jane and Louise Wilson (born 1967), British artists, working together as a sibling duo
- Jane Perceval (née Wilson; 1769–1844), wife of Spencer Perceval
- Jane Wilson, a character in Mary Barton (1848), a novel by Elizabeth Gaskell

== See also ==
- Jane Wynne Willson (born 1933), British humanist
