= Delaplaine =

Delaplaine can refer to:

== People ==
- Andrew Delaplaine (1949–2023), American screenwriter
- Isaac C. Delaplaine (1817–1866), American politician from New York
- Jane Delaplaine Wilson (1830–1915), American writer

== Other ==
- Delaplaine, Arkansas
