= Rossville Historic District (Hamilton, Ohio) =

Historic district in Ohio, United States

- U.S. National Register of Historic Places
- U.S. Historic district
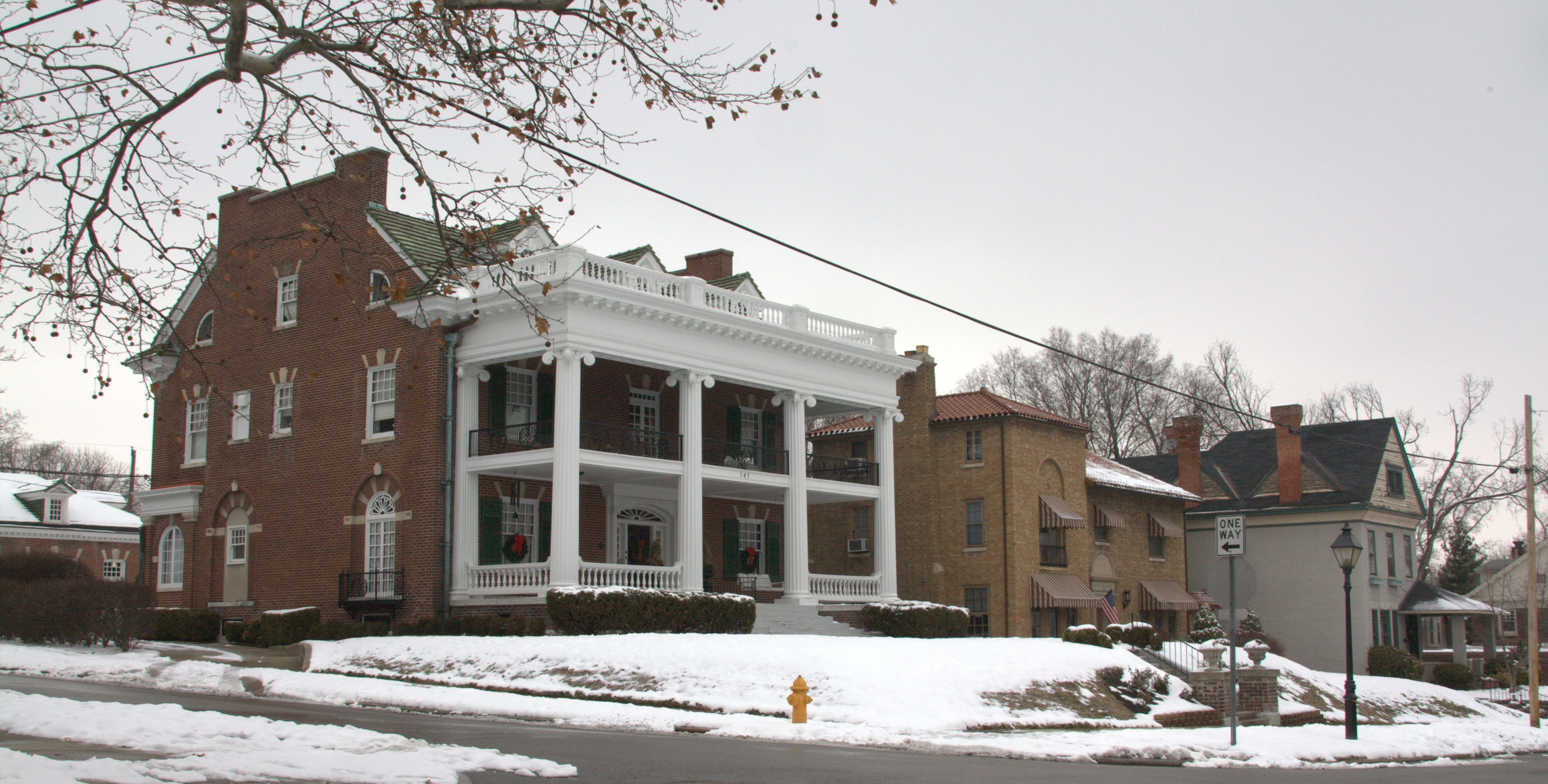

- Location within Ohio Location within the United States
- Location: Hamilton, Ohio
- Coordinates: 39°24′11″N 84°34′15″W
- Area: 569 acres (2.30 km^{2})
- Architect: Frederick G. Mueller
- Architectural style: Federal, Late Victorian and Stick-Eastlake
- NRHP reference No.: 75001332
- Added to NRHP: 1975-10-06

Rossville Historic District is a registered historic district in Hamilton, Ohio, listed in the National Register of Historic Places on 1975-10-06. It contains 123 contributing buildings.

The neighborhood is located on the west side of the Great Miami River across from downtown Hamilton. Large mansions line South 'D' Street and other stately homes line Ross Avenue. The area takes its name from the old town of Rossville, which merged with Hamilton in 1854.

The Rossville Historic Preservation Organization, founded in 1974, coordinates preservation activities in the neighborhood. One of their most popular events is the bi-annual Rossville Home and Garden Tour where visitors can stroll through many of the homes and lush gardens in the neighborhood.

== Historic uses ==
- Single Dwelling
- Specialty Store
- Rail-Related
