= Miami University Hamilton =

Campus of Miami University in Hamilton, Ohio, US

- Type: Public satellite campus
- Established: 1968; 58 years ago
- Founder: Phillip Shriver
- Parent institution: Miami University
- Dean: Moira Casey
- Students: 2,374
- Location: Hamilton, Ohio, United States; 39.378°N 84.563°W
- Colors: Red and White
- Nickname: Harriers
- Sporting affiliations: ORCC; USCAA
- Mascot: Harry the Harrier
- Website: miamioh.edu/regionals/

Miami University Hamilton (Miami Hamilton) is a satellite campus of Miami University in Hamilton, Ohio. It was founded in 1968 and is one of three regional campuses of Miami University.

== History ==
In 1946, Miami University began offering classes in Hamilton and Middletown to serve residents of those communities who were unable to attend college elsewhere. The success of these classes led to the establishment of five academic centers in Norwood, Dayton, Piqua, and the existing Hamilton and Middletown locations. Steady growth in student enrollment, along with strong local support for higher education, led to the opening of the permanent Miami University Middletown campus in 1966 and the Hamilton campus in 1968. The academic centers in Dayton and Piqua were eventually replaced by Wright State University, while the University of Cincinnati assumed responsibility for the Norwood center.

In June 2026, the university's board of trustees approved the creation of Miami University Polytechnic at the Hamilton campus. The school will focus on polytechnic education in tandem with the Advanced Manufacturing Workforce and Innovation Hub in Hamilton.

== Campus ==
Miami Hamilton is a small, compact campus consisting of five academic buildings, a gymnasium, and a conservatory. The Robinson-Schwenn Building in downtown Hamilton is used as an arts and community center.

=== Buildings ===
- The Conservatory – 2006, houses several sustained environments, contains space for lectures and demonstrations.
- Gym – 1980, houses fitness center and 120-foot gymnasium.
- Mosler Hall – 1969, named in memory of the Mosler Foundation's founders Mr. and Mrs. Edwin Mosler, Sr; houses Business Office, Computer Labs, Faculty offices, and One Stop for Student Success.
- Phelps Hall – 1972, named for Dr. Bernard F. Phelps, former mayor of Oxford and first director of the Hamilton Campus; houses departments of Justice and Community studies, Integrative studies, and Engineering Technology, and a state of the art Theatre Studio.
- Rentschler Hall – 1968, named in honor of the Rentschler family who supported higher public education in the Hamilton area; houses the Multi-cultural services, Learning Assistance, Student Services, Faculty Offices, Art Studios, Darkroom, and labs.
- Schwarm Hall – 1997, houses the Harrier's Nest dining hall on the first floor and the Rentschler Library on the second floor. The building is connected to Harry T. Wilks Conference center via a bridge that forms the entrance archway into the university.
- University Hall – 1972, houses Miami University Regionals Nursing program.
- Harry T. Wilks Conference Center – 1997, named for retired Hamilton attorney Harry Wilks who created endowment fund scholarships for Hamilton campus students who could not otherwise financially attend college and houses the Office of Admission.

== Academics ==
Miami University Hamilton is a small, primarily nonresidential teaching university with a focus on undergraduate studies. The College of Liberal Arts and Applied Science is an academic division of Miami University housed entirely at Miami University Hamilton and consists of twelve academic departments. The university offers 31 majors and 10 minors.

== Student life ==
Demographics of student body – Fall 2023
	Undergraduate
Non-Hispanic White	70%
Black	9%
Asian	4%
Hispanic (of any race)	6%
Race/Ethnicity Unknown	2%
Two or More Races	4%
U.S. Nonresident	5%

In 2023, Miami Hamilton had a total enrollment of 2,374 admitted students. Of these, 45% were male and 55% were female.

Miami Hamilton has over 53 registered student organizations. These clubs and organizations vary from Arts & Humanities, to political and religious groups, geology, theatre and LGBTQ+ organizations. The university recognizes the Regionals Student Government (RSG) who represent the students of Miami Hamilton. The RSG members work closely with administrators, faculty and staff, providing input that influences many administrative decisions directly affecting students. Members act as liaisons between students and faculty and serve as voting members on the University Senate on the Oxford campus and the Hamilton Campus Senate.

== Athletics ==
Miami University Hamilton is home of the Miami Hamilton Harriers. The Harriers field competitive teams in men's baseball, basketball, golf and tennis; women's teams include basketball, cheerleading, softball, tennis and volleyball. Miami Hamilton is a member of the United States Collegiate Athletic Association and can complete for National Championships.

The Harrier Baseball Program has been the campus's most successful athletic program, claiming the ORCC Regular Season and Tournament Championship in 11 of the last 12 seasons.

Miami Hamilton's athletic teams were originally known as the Chiefs. In 1997, the Miami people withdrew their support for the Miami University "Redskins" nickname, prompting the university to rename to Miami RedHawks. At the same time, Miami Hamilton changed their name to the Harriers and Miami Middletown changed their name to the ThunderHawks.
