= Floyd Reid =

American football player (1927–1994)

Breezy Reid
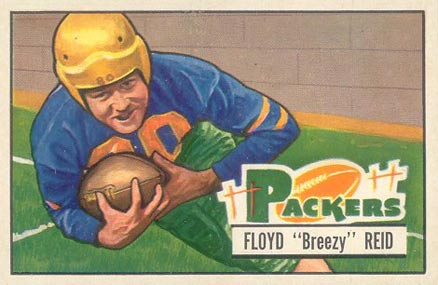
- Reid on a 1951 Bowman football card

No. 80, 24
- Position: Halfback

Personal information
- Born: September 4, 1927; Bridgeton, New Jersey, U.S.
- Died: March 15, 1994 (aged 66); Hamilton, Ohio, U.S.
- Listed height: 5 ft 10 in (1.78 m)
- Listed weight: 187 lb (85 kg)

Career information
- High school: Hamilton
- College: Georgia (1945, 1947–1949)
- NFL draft: 1950: 9th round, 107th overall pick

Career history

Playing
- Chicago Bears (1950)*; Green Bay Packers (1950–1956)
- * Offseason or practice squad member only

Coaching
- Green Bay Packers (1958) Backfield coach; Buffalo Bills (1960) Offensive backs coach; Buffalo Bills (1961) Assistant coach

Awards and highlights
- Second-team All-SEC (1949)

Career NFL statistics
- Rushing yards: 1,964
- Rushing average: 4.3
- Receptions: 72
- Receiving yards: 868
- Total touchdowns: 18
- Stats at Pro Football Reference

Floyd "Breezy" Reid (September 4, 1927 – March 15, 1994) was an American football running back who played for the Green Bay Packers of the National Football League (NFL). Reid attended the University of Georgia. He was selected in the ninth round (107th overall) of the 1950 NFL draft by the Chicago Bears.

Reid's son, Andy Reid followed in his footsteps as a halfback for the Bulldogs and made an NFL roster with the 1976 Buffalo Bills.

== NFL career statistics ==
Legend
**Bold**	Career high

Year	Team	Games		Rushing					Receiving				
Year	Team	GP	GS	Att	Yds	Avg	Lng	TD	Rec	Yds	Avg	Lng	TD
1950	GNB	11	0	87	394	4.5	57	1	11	120	10.9	44	**2**
1951	GNB	12	0	23	73	3.2	33	0	9	115	12.8	29	0
1952	GNB	12	8	58	156	2.7	14	2	12	**250**	**20.8**	**81**	**2**
1953	GNB	12	12	95	492	**5.2**	43	3	10	100	10.0	26	0
1954	GNB	12	12	**99**	**507**	5.1	**69**	**5**	**14**	129	9.2	25	0
1955	GNB	12	11	83	303	3.7	28	2	13	138	10.6	60	1
1956	GNB	7	5	14	39	2.8	11	0	3	16	5.3	12	0
Career		78	48	459	1,964	4.3	69	13	72	868	12.1	81	5
