= David Klarich =

American politician and attorney

- Born: David J. Klarich; July 17, 1963 (age 62); Hamilton, Ohio, U.S.
- Education: University of Missouri; Regent University (JD)
- Occupation: Politician

David J. Klarich (born July 17, 1963) is a former American Republican politician and attorney who has served in the Missouri Senate and the Missouri House of Representatives.

Born in Hamilton, Ohio, Klarich graduated from University of Missouri with a bachelor's degree in biology and from Regent University with a master's degree in public policy and a Juris Doctor degree. In 2002, Klarich resigned his seat in the state senate when he was appointed to the Missouri Labor and Industrial Relations Commission by Governor Bob Holden.
