= Katherine K. Preston =

American musicologist (born 1950)

Katherine K. Preston (née Imfeld, born December 7, 1950) is an American musicologist and educator. She taught on the faculty of the College of William & Mary from 1989 until 2018 when she retired and was named a professor emerita. She has authored biographies on composers Scott Joplin and George Frederick Bristow as well as books on traveling musicians and opera troupes in the United States during the 19th century. According to the New Grove Dictionary of Music and Musicians, she is considered an authority on the music of early America and 19th century America.

== Life and career ==
Preston was born in Hamilton, Ohio, on December 7, 1950. She earned a Bachelor of Arts degree from Evergreen State College in 1974 and a Master of Music degree from the University of Maryland in 1981. At the latter institution, she emphasized in musicology where she was a pupil of Eugene Helm. She later studied musicology under H. Wiley Hitchcock at the City University of New York where she graduated with a PhD in 1989.

Preston interned at the Smithsonian Institution from 1979 to 1981. She joined the faculty of the music department at the College of William and Mary in 1989. She served as chair of that department from 2000 through 2007, after which she was the David N. and Margaret C. Bottoms Professor of Music. She held that position until her retirement at the conclusion of the 2017–2018 academic year. She was made a professor emerita in 2018. In addition to her work at William and Mary, she was a visiting professor at Keele University (1998) and the University of Leiden (2009). From 1997 to 2002, she was Secretary of the Society for American Music.

Preston is the author of Music for Hire: The Work of Journeymen Musicians in Washington, DC, 1875–1900 (1983, Pendragon Press), Scott Joplin: Composer (1989, Melrose Square Publishing Company), Opera on the Road: Traveling Opera Companies in the United States 1825–1860 (1993, University of Illinois Press), and Opera for the People: English-language Opera and Women Managers in Late 19th-century America (2017, Oxford University Press). Her biography on composer George Frederick Bristow was published by University of Illinois Press in 2020.
