= Butler County Courthouse (Ohio) =

Local government building in the United States

- U.S. National Register of Historic Places
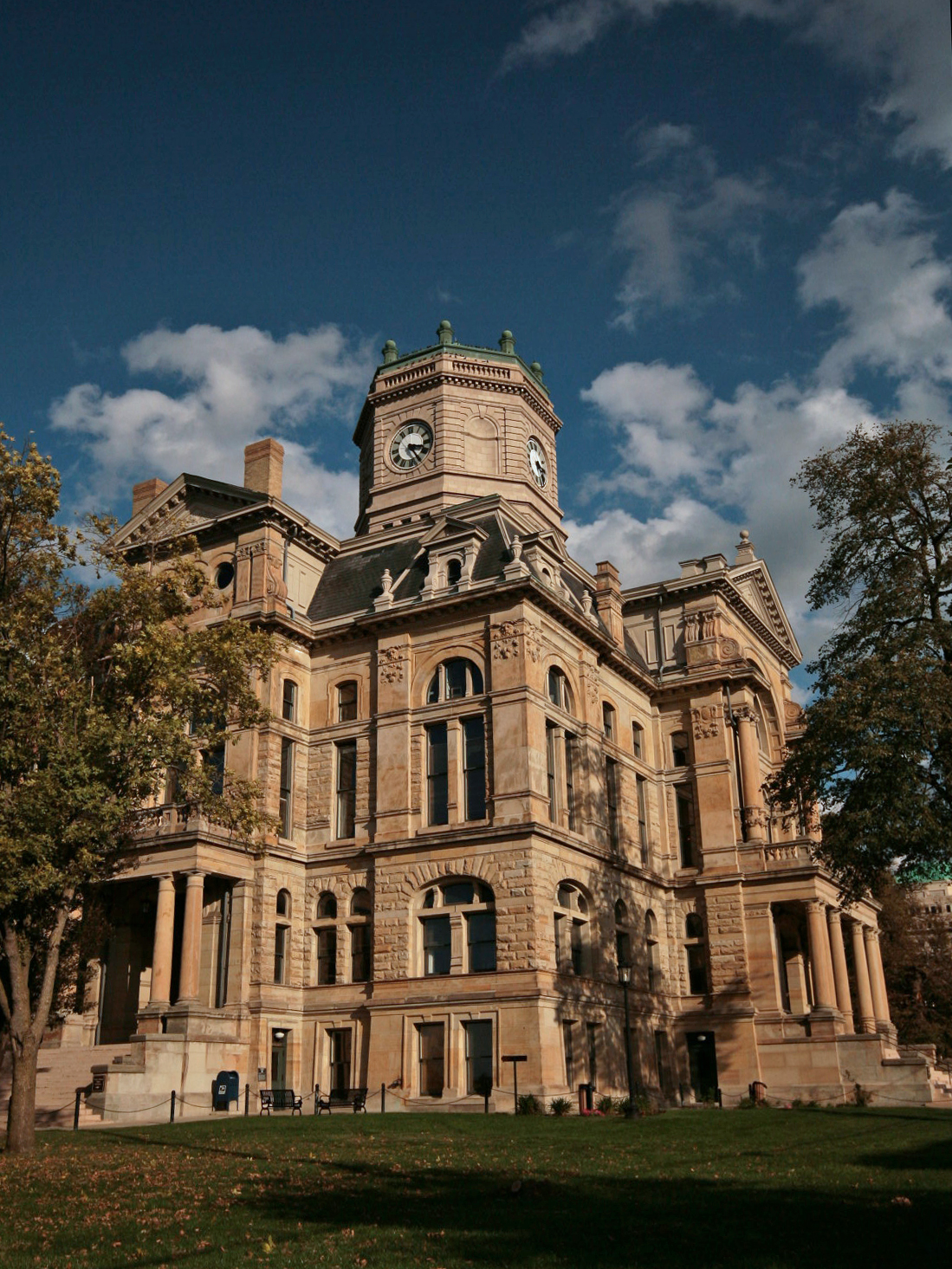
- The Butler County Courthouse in Hamilton, Ohio

- Location within Ohio Location within the United States
- Interactive map showing the location for Butler County Courthouse
- Location: Hamilton, Ohio
- Coordinates: 39°23′59.47″N 84°33′42.62″W
- Architects: Freeman Compton Contractors and Gibbs, D. W., & Company
- Architectural style: Second Empire and Other
- NRHP reference No.: 81000429
- Added to NRHP: 1981-06-22

The Butler County Courthouse is located in Hamilton, Ohio and was constructed from 1885–1889 by architect David W. Gibbs. The courthouse is a registered historic building listed in the National Register on June 22, 1981.

== History ==
Butler County was established in 1803 from a section of Hamilton County. The county seat selected was Hamilton and the first courthouse was built 1806 and the second in 1817 on the site of the present structure. When the county realized that the courthouse was too small for the population, a new plan by D.W. Gibbs and was designed in the Second Empire style with features from the Italianate style.

County officials laid the building's cornerstone on October 29, 1885. As county funds were insufficient for construction, contracts could not be let until enabling legislation for bond issuance had been passed by the Ohio General Assembly; the necessary legislation was sponsored by George F. Elliott, the senator from Butler County. When originally built, the courthouse centered on a four-part clock tower, which was replaced by a smaller tower with a dome after the original tower collapsed in a 1912 fire. The 1912 tower remains in place, minus the dome, which fell prey to lightning in the 1920s.

== Exterior ==
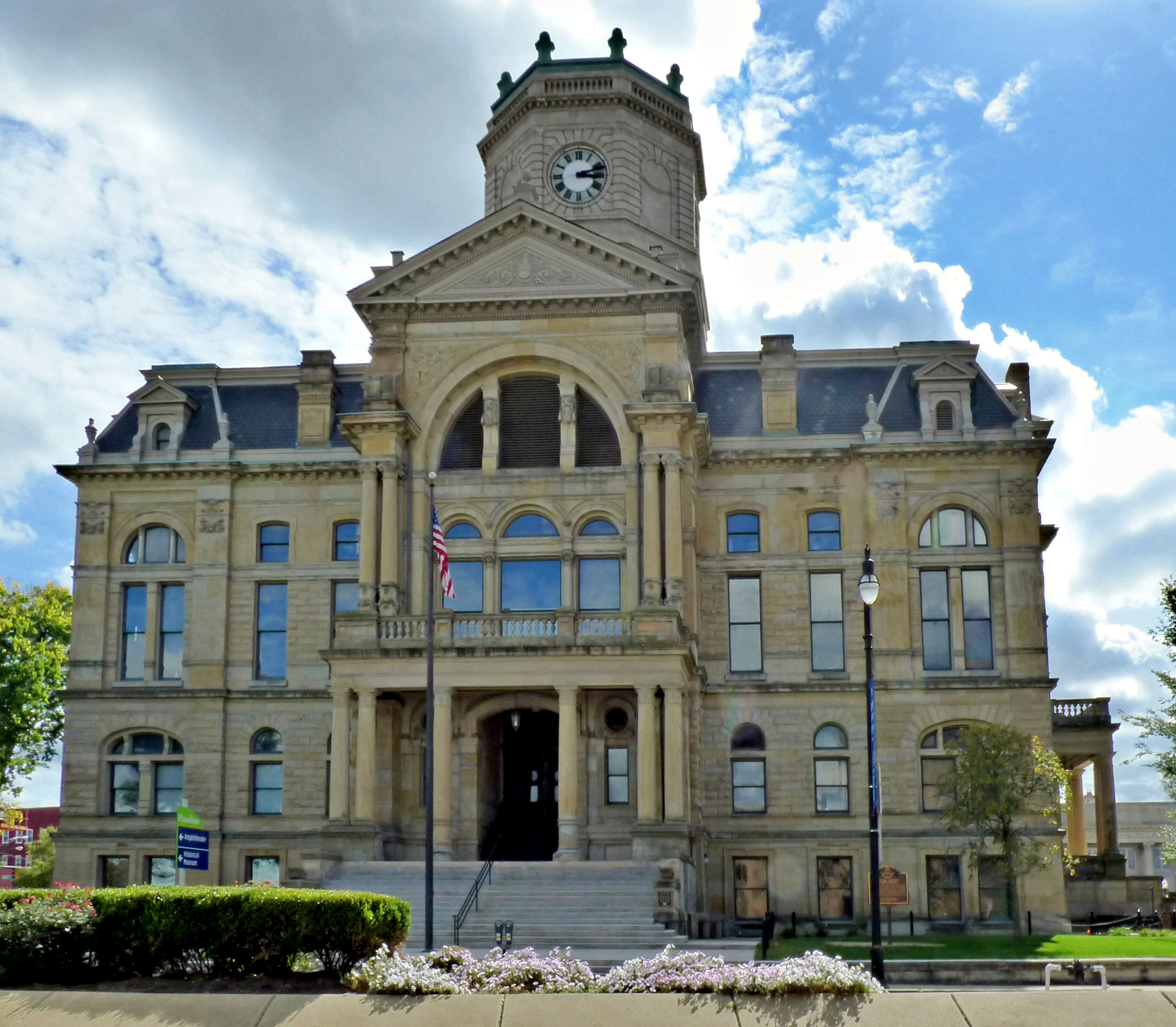
Detail of main entrance on north face of structure

The main entrance is reached by stairs which enter into a covered porch. Above the porch is a high design arch supported by Ionic columns. This arch in turn holds a pediment capped with an urn. The mansard-roof gives way to a central tower. The original tower was once four-tiered, domed, and capped with a statue of Justice. This was destroyed in a fire in 1912 when the tower collapsed. It was replaced shortly thereafter with a massive tower and dome designed by local architect Frederick Mueller, but the dome was removed in 1926 after it was struck by lightning. The octagonal tower remains and contains a four-faced clock and is topped with eight spires around the top.

When Butler County constructed the Government Services Center in 1999, architecture firm Lorenze and Williams (now LWC Inc.) replicated the green octagonal roof on top of the 11-story tower.

== Interior ==
The interior was restored to its original appearance and is a balance of symmetry and design elements. The lobby serves as a reception area as well as a museum housing the old clerk of court's desk and an antique cabinet with the hand of the original statue of Justice. The lobby is illuminated by skylight and contains a walnut double staircase. A balcony runs along the open hallway of the third floor with arched portals to the offices around the exterior of the building.
