= Hamilton City School District =

School district in Ohio

- 533 Dayton Street Hamilton, Ohio, Butler County, 45012

District information
- Type: Public
- Motto: Big Blue on the Move
- Grades: Pre-K–12
- Superintendent: Andrea Blevins
- Asst. superintendent(s): Mike Wright
- School board: Hamilton City School Board
- Chair of the board: Shaquila Mathews
- NCES District ID: 3904410

Students and staff
- Students: 10,125 (2019-20)
- Teachers: 481 (2019-20)
- Student–teacher ratio: 21:1 (2019-20)
- Athletic conference: OHSAA
- Colors: Blue and White

Other information
- Website: www.hamiltoncityschools.com

Hamilton City School District is a public school district serving students in Hamilton, Ohio. The school enrolls 10,125 students in the 2019–20 school year. Their mission statement is "Together, Positively Impacting Learning and Life".

== School Board ==
The Hamilton City School board is the governing body of the school district. There are 5 elected members. Current Members as of November 2019:

- Laurin Sprague, President
- Mag Baker, Vice President
- Shaquila Mathews
- Steve Isgro
- Rob Weigel

== Schools ==
=== Elementary schools ===
- Bridgeport Elementary School (2171 Bridgeport Drive, Hamilton)
- Brookwood Elementary School (1325 Stahlheber Road, Hamilton)
- Crawford Woods Elementary School (2200 Hensley Avenue, Hamilton)
- Fairwood Elementary School (281 North Fair Avenue, Hamilton)
- Highland Elementary School (1125 Main Street, Hamilton)
- Linden Elementary School (801 Hoadley Avenue, Hamilton)
- Ridgeway Elementary School (267 Wasserman Road, Hamilton)
- Riverview Elementary School (250 Knightsbridge Drive, Hamilton)

=== Middle schools ===
- Garfield Middle School (250 North Fair Avenue, Hamilton)
- Wilson Middle School (714 Eaton Avenue, Hamilton)

=== High schools ===
- Hamilton High School (Freshman Campus: 2260 NW Washington Blvd., Hamilton) (Main Campus: 1165 Eaton Avenue, Hamilton)
- The Miami School - alternative high school (140 Ross Avenue, Hamilton)
