= Patrick McCollum =

Wiccan minister, prison chaplain, author, jeweler

- McCollum in 2009
- Born: April 11, 1950 (age 76)

Patrick McCollum (born April 11, 1950) is an interfaith chaplain, spiritual mentor, and peace counselor.

== Career ==
On February 5, 2008, McCollum testified before the U.S. Commission on Civil Rights, and his remarks were widely quoted in the commission's report entitled "Enforcing Religious Freedom in Prison".

In 2025, filmmaker Gabe Polsky released the documentary The Man Who Saves the World? which chronicles McCollum's spiritual diplomacy and environmental activism in the Amazon rainforest. The film premiered in select U.S. cities to critical acclaim, including positive reviews from RogerEbert.com and others.

In October 2025, The New Yorker published a feature article titled Will Patrick McCollum Save Us All? profiling McCollum's global peace and environmental efforts.

That same month, People magazine said that Goodall had assumed for some of her ashes be kept in McCollum's World Peace Violin.

== Awards ==
McCollum received the Mahatma Gandhi Award at the Capitol Building in Washington, D.C. in 2010 for the advancement of religious pluralism, and the Ralph Bunche International Peace Award in March 2016 during the UN Conference on the Status of Women.

On February 1, 2020, chimpanzee biologist Jane Goodall nominated McCollum for the position of Messenger of Peace for the United Nations. In a Facebook video Goodall said "I nominate him now for UN Messenger of Peace. He has done so much for peace on this planet. For these past fifty years, he has been standing up for indigenous rights and for the rights of women and for the rights of different religions to be heard; for understanding between people of different races. And, in fact, there’s very few social issues that he hasn’t been involved in."

== Bibliography ==
- Courting The Lady, A Wiccan Journey, Book One: The Sacred Path (Our Lady of the Wells Press, 2006).
