= Wish I Knew You =

Single by the Revivalists

from the album Men Amongst Mountains
- Released: February 23, 2016
- Genre: Alternative rock, indie rock
- Length: 4:34
- Label: Washington Square; Razor & Tie; Wind-up; Concord
- Songwriter: The Revivalists
- Producer: Ben Ellman

The Revivalists singles chronology
"Keep Going" (2015)	"Wish I Knew You" (2016)	"All My Friends" (2018)

Music video
- "Wish I Knew You" on YouTube

"Wish I Knew You" is a song by American rock band the Revivalists. The song was written by the band and was produced by Ben Ellman, and released on their 2015 album Men Amongst Mountains. The song peaked at number 1 on the Billboard Adult Alternative Airplay chart, becoming the band's first chart-topper on the chart. The song also found success on a number of other rock radio formats, as well as adult contemporary stations. This song had also set a record in May 2017 (since beaten by Portugal. The Man's track "Live in the Moment") for the most plays (spins) ever recorded during a week's time (3,488 across the panel) for any track on Alternative/Modern Rock radio since the inception of Mediabase tracking systems in 1988.

In February 2021, for the 25th anniversary of Adult Alternative Airplay, Billboard ranked "Wish I Knew You" at number 57 on its list of the 100 most successful songs in the chart's history; in September 2023, the magazine ranked the song at number 84 on a similar retrospective list for the 35th anniversary of Alternative Airplay.

== Music video ==
The music video was released on February 24, 2016.

== Use in other media ==
The song was featured in a 2017 commercial for Blue Moon.

== Charts ==
=== Weekly charts ===
Chart (2016–18)	Peak position
Canada Hot AC (Billboard)	35
Canada Rock (Billboard)	11
Czech Republic Modern Rock (IFPI)	10
Greece Digital Songs (Billboard)	6
Iceland (Tónlistinn)	20
US Billboard Hot 100	84
US Adult Contemporary (Billboard)	18
US Adult Pop Airplay (Billboard)	14
US Hot Rock & Alternative Songs (Billboard)	4
US Rock & Alternative Airplay (Billboard)	2

=== Year-end charts ===
Chart (2016)	Position
US Adult Alternative Songs (Billboard)	3
Chart (2017)	Position
US Adult Top 40 (Billboard)	46
US Hot Rock Songs (Billboard)	7
US Rock Airplay Songs (Billboard)	3
Chart (2018)	Position
Iceland (Plötutíóindi)	74
US Hot Rock Songs (Billboard)	54

== Certifications ==
Region	Certification	Certified units/sales
Canada (Music Canada)	Platinum	80,000^{‡}
New Zealand (RMNZ)	Gold	15,000^{‡}
United States (RIAA)	3× Platinum	3,000,000^{‡}
^{‡} Sales+streaming figures based on certification alone.

== Release history ==
Region	Date	Format	Label	Ref.
United States	March 7, 2016	Triple A radio	Washington Square; Wind-up	
United States	October 25, 2016	Modern rock radio	Washington Square; Wind-up	
United States	April 10, 2017	Hot AC radio	Washington Square; Wind-up	

== See also ==
- List of Billboard number-one adult alternative singles of the 2010s
