= Hamilton, Ohio =

City in Ohio, US

- City
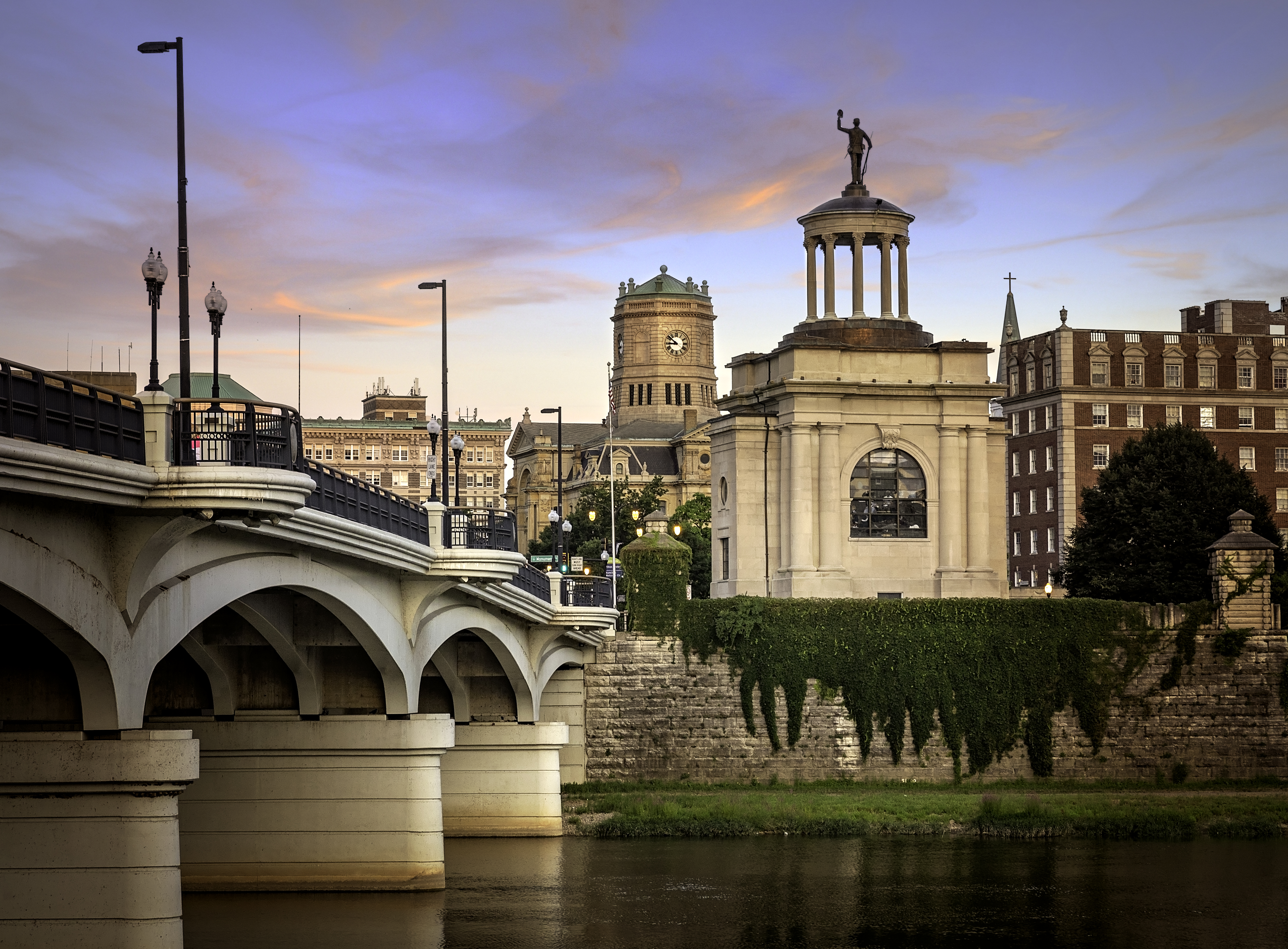
- High-Main Street bridge in downtown Hamilton, 2018

- Logo
- Motto: "An Award Winning Community"
- Interactive map of Hamilton, Ohio
- Location within Ohio Location within the United States
- Coordinates: 39°22′58″N 84°33′41″W
- Country: United States
- State: Ohio
- County: Butler

Government
  - Mayor: Pat Moeller

Area
  - Total: 21.89 sq mi (56.70 km^{2})
  - Land: 21.45 sq mi (55.56 km^{2})
  - Water: 0.44 sq mi (1.15 km^{2})
- Elevation: 587 ft (179 m)

Population (2020)
  - Total: 63,399
  - Estimate (2025): 64,644
  - Density: 2,955.6/sq mi (1,141.18/km^{2})
- Time zone: UTC−5 (Eastern (EST))
  - Summer (DST): UTC−4 (EDT)
- ZIP code: 45011-15, 45018
- Area code: 513
- FIPS code: 39-33012
- GNIS feature ID: 1085809
- Website: hamilton-oh.gov

Hamilton is a city in Butler County, Ohio, United States, and its county seat. It is 20 miles (32 km) north of Cincinnati along the Great Miami River. Its population was 63,399 at the 2020 census, making Hamilton the second-most-populous city in the Cincinnati metropolitan area and the 10th-most-populous city in Ohio. Most of the city is served by the Hamilton City School District.

== History ==
=== Fort Hamilton ===
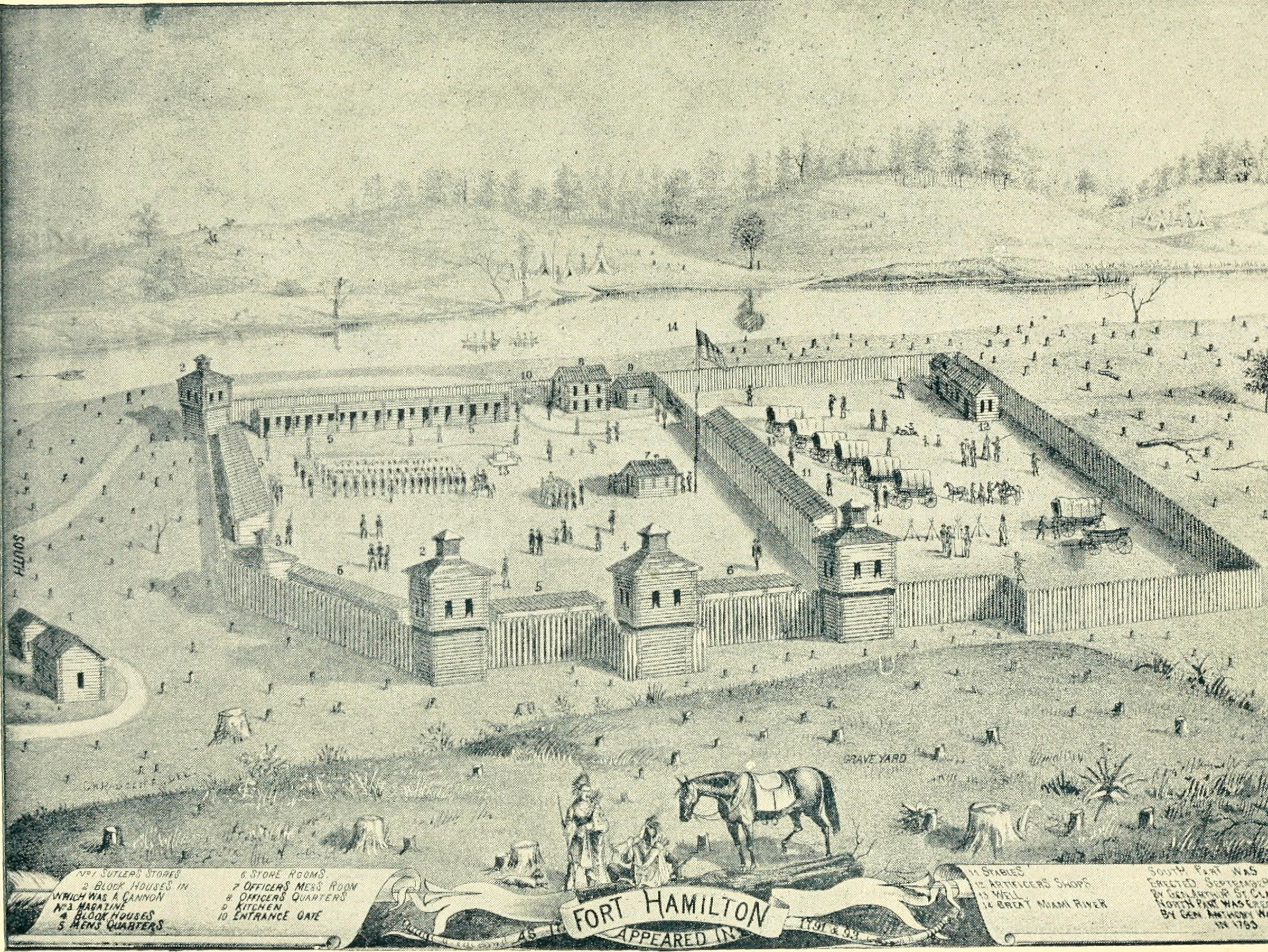
An 1892 depiction of Fort Hamilton in the 1790s

Hamilton originated as Fort Hamilton, named to honor Alexander Hamilton, first Secretary of the Treasury. The fort was constructed in September through October 1791 by General Arthur St. Clair, governor of the Northwest Territory. It was the first of several built north from Fort Washington into Indian territory. The fort was built to serve as a supply station for the troops of St. Clair during his campaign in the Northwest Indian War. Later, it was used by General "Mad" Anthony Wayne. It was located 28 miles (45 km) upstream from the mouth of the Great Miami River, where the river is shallow during normal flow and easily forded on its gravelly bottom by men, animals, and wagons. In 1792, the fort was enlarged with a stable area by General Wayne. The fort was abandoned in 1796 after the signing of the Treaty of Greenville.

=== Settlement and growth ===
A settlement grew up around Fort Hamilton and was platted as Fairfield in 1794. By 1800, Hamilton was becoming an agricultural and regional trading town. The town was platted, government was seated, and the town named by 1803.

Hamilton was first incorporated by an act of the Ohio General Assembly in 1810, but lost its status in 1815 for failure to hold elections. It was reincorporated in 1827 with Rossville, the community across the Great Miami River in St. Clair Township. The two places severed their connection in 1831, only to be rejoined in 1854. Designated the county seat, this became a city in 1857. On March 14, 1867, Hamilton withdrew from the townships of Fairfield and St. Clair to form a "paper township", but the city government is dominant.

On the afternoon of September 17, 1859, Abraham Lincoln arrived at the Hamilton Station (the station is on the city's Historic Preservation list). He gave a campaign speech in support of his fellow Republican, William Dennison, who was running for Ohio governor. Lincoln's speech concentrated on popular sovereignty. He began: "This beautiful and far-famed Miami Valley is the garden spot of the world". During this campaign, the relatively unknown Lincoln was first mentioned as a possible presidential contender.

==== Hamilton Hydraulic ====
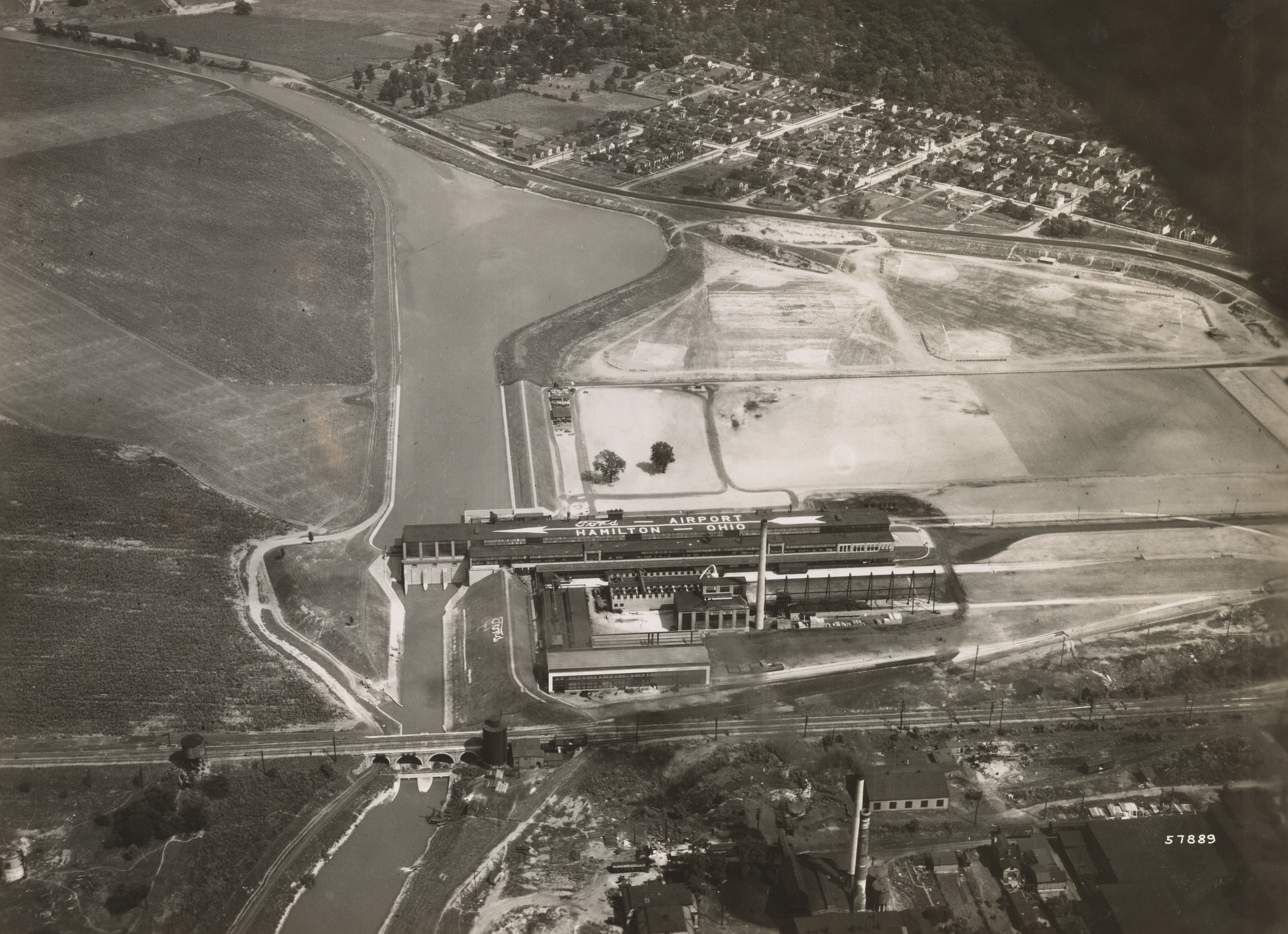
Ford Plant in 1927

The Hamilton Hydraulic, also called the Hamilton and Rossville Hydraulic, was a system devised to supply water power to shops and mills; it spurred one of Hamilton's greatest periods of industrial and population growth from 1840 to 1860. Specially built canals and natural reservoirs brought water from the Great Miami River north of Hamilton into the town as a source of power for future industries.

The hydraulic began about four miles (6.4 km) north of Hamilton on the river, where a dam was built to divert water into the system. Nearby, two reservoirs stored water for the hydraulic, whose main canal continued south along North Fifth Street to present Market Street. There, it took a sharp west turn to the river at the present intersection of Market Street and North Monument Avenue, between the former Hamilton Municipal Building and the present Courtyard by Marriott. The first water passed through the system in January 1845. As the water flowed through the canal, it turned millstones in the hydraulic. The project had been a risky one because no shops were along its course to use the power when the company was organized in 1842, but the gamble paid off. Several small industries were built on the hydraulic in the 1840s. One was the Beckett Paper Company, established in 1848, the oldest paper mill west of the Allegheny Mountains.

The hydraulic remained a principal source of power for Hamilton industries through the 1870s, when stationary steam engines became practical and affordable. Later, most of the hydraulic canal was covered and/or filled. The hydraulic attracted auto manufacturer Henry Ford to Hamilton after World War I, when he sought a site for a tractor factory. Ford built a plant, which soon converted to producing auto parts, at the north end of North Fifth Street, so it could take advantage of power provided by a branch of the hydraulic.

=== Industrialization ===
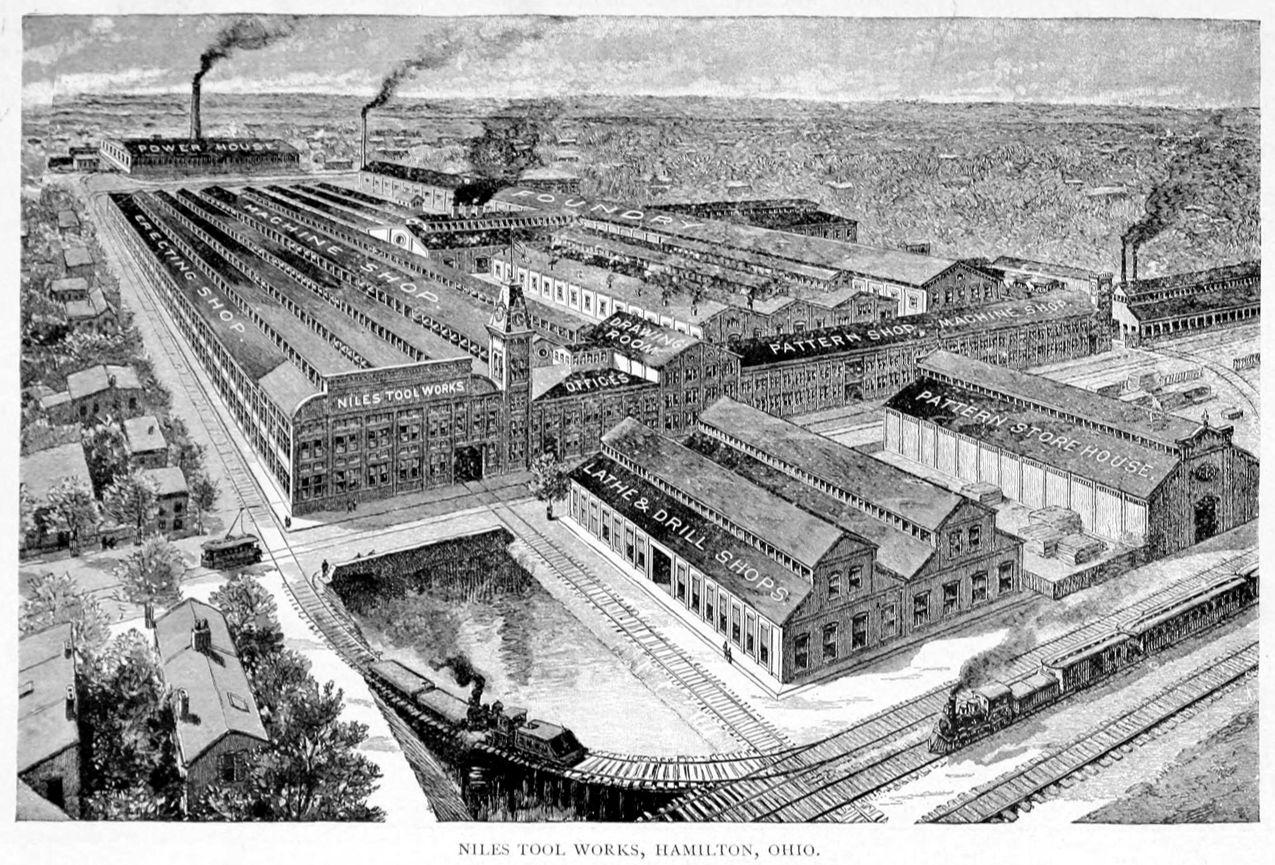
Niles Tool Works in Hamilton, 1896

By the mid-19th century, Hamilton had developed as a significant manufacturing city. Its early products were often machines and equipment used to process the region's farm produce, such as steam engines, hay cutters, reapers, and threshers. Other production included machine tools, house hardware, saws for mills, paper, paper-making machinery, carriages, guns, whiskey, beer, woolen goods, and myriad and diverse output made from metal, grain, and cloth.

By the early 20th century, the town was a heavy-manufacturing center for vaults and safes, machine tools, cans for vegetables, paper, paper-making machinery, locomotives, frogs and switches for railroads, steam engines, diesel engines, foundry products, printing presses, and automobile parts. During the two world wars, its factories manufactured war materiel, Liberty ship engines, and gun lathes. Manufacturers used coke to feed furnaces. Its byproduct, gas, fueled streetlights. The Great Miami River Valley, in which Hamilton was located, had become an industrial giant.

The Butler County Courthouse, constructed between 1885 and 1889, was listed on the National Register of Historic Places because of its monumental architecture. The city has three historic districts: Dayton Lane, German Village, and Rossville. Like Cincinnati, Hamilton attracted many German and Italian immigrants from the mid-19th century on, whose influence was expressed in culture, food, and architecture. Hamilton also had a Jewish community; with increased immigration by Eastern European Jews, they founded Beth Israel Synagogue in 1901 as an Orthodox alternative to Hamilton's Reform synagogue, which had been founded by German Jews in the 1880s, when nearby Cincinnati was a center of Reform Judaism in the United States. At the time, around 250 Jewish families lived in Hamilton.

=== Great Miami River Flood 1913 ===
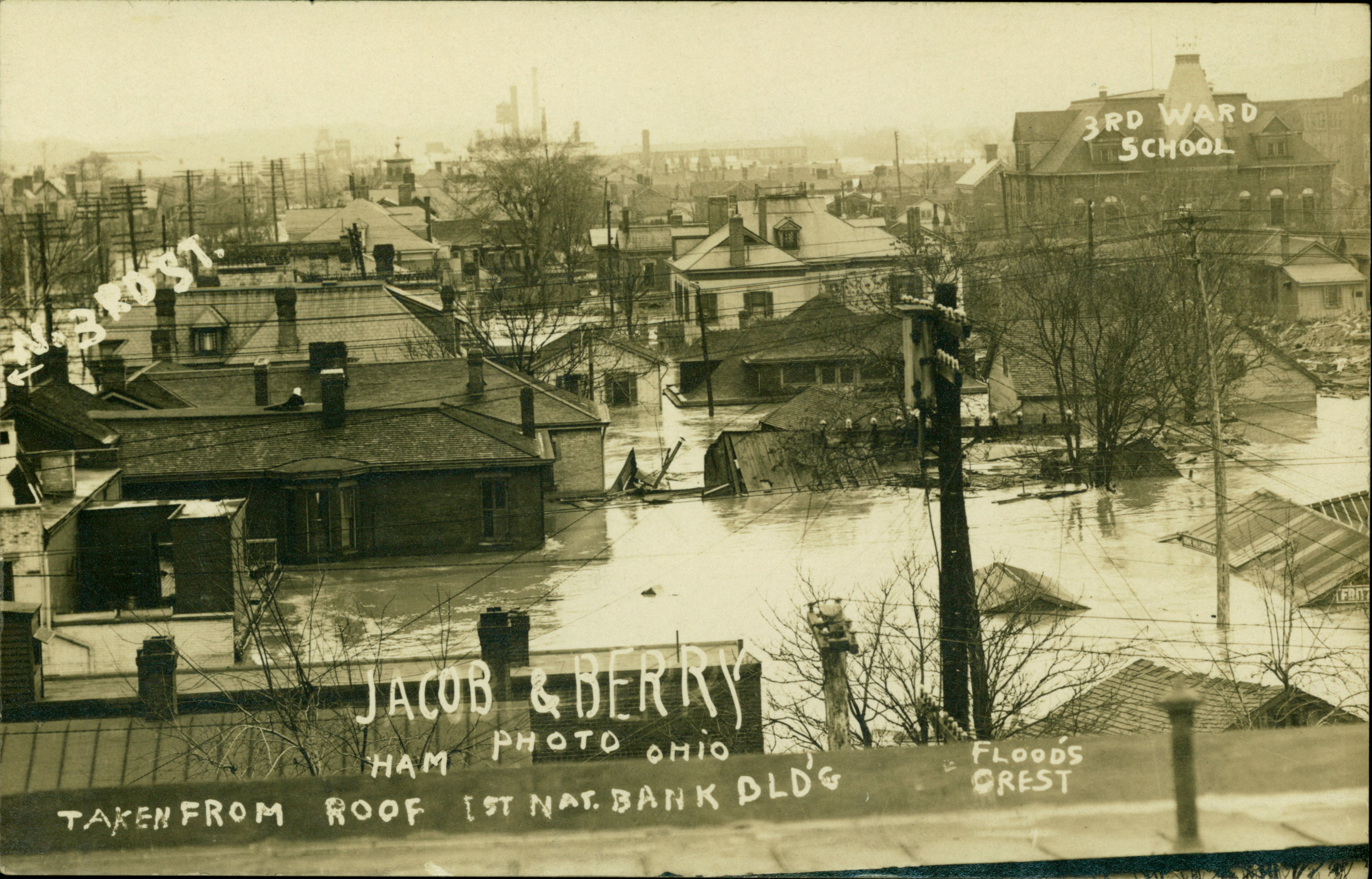
The Great Flood in Hamilton, at left is North 3rd Street

Geographic and geological evidence shows that floods have occurred throughout the valley since prehistoric times. Since European-American settlement, diaries, anecdotes, folk tales, letters, and official records have provided documentation of relatively common severe floods in 1814, 1828, 1832, 1847, 1866, 1883, 1897, 1898, and 1907.

In March 1913, the greatest flood occurred in Hamilton. Heavy rain fell over the entire watershed, and the ground was frozen, as well as saturated from previous lighter rains. This resulted in a high rate of run-off from the rain; an estimated 90% flowed directly into the streams, creeks, and rivers. Between 9 and 11 inches (23 and 28 cm) of rain fell over five days, March 25 to 29, 1913. An amount equivalent to about 30 days' discharge of water over Niagara Falls flowed through the Miami Valley during the ensuing flood. In the Great Miami River Valley, 360 persons died, about 200 of whom were from Hamilton. Some drowned, some were washed away and never found, others died from various diseases and complications, and some committed suicide because of severe losses. Damage in the valley was calculated at $100 million, the equivalent of $2 billion in 21st-century value. The flood waters were so powerful that within two hours, they destroyed all four of Hamilton's bridges: Black Street, High-Main Street, Columbia, and the CH&D railroad.

In Hamilton, the floodwaters rose with unexpected and frightening suddenness, reaching over 3 to 8 feet in depth in downtown, and up to 18 feet in the North End, along Fifth Street and through South Hamilton Crossing. The waters spread from D Street on the west to what is now Erie Highway on the east. The waters' rise was so swift that many people were trapped in the upper floors of businesses and houses. In some cases, people had to escape to their attics, and then break through the roof as the waters rose even higher. Temperatures hovered near freezing. The water current varied, but in constricted locations, it raced at more than 20 miles per hour. Dead people, more than 1,000 drowned horses, other drowned livestock and pets, and sewage tainted the water. Nearly one-third of Hamilton's population (10,000 of 35,000) was left homeless and displaced. Thousands of houses were destroyed by the flood; afterward, many were too damaged to repair and had to be demolished by city workers.

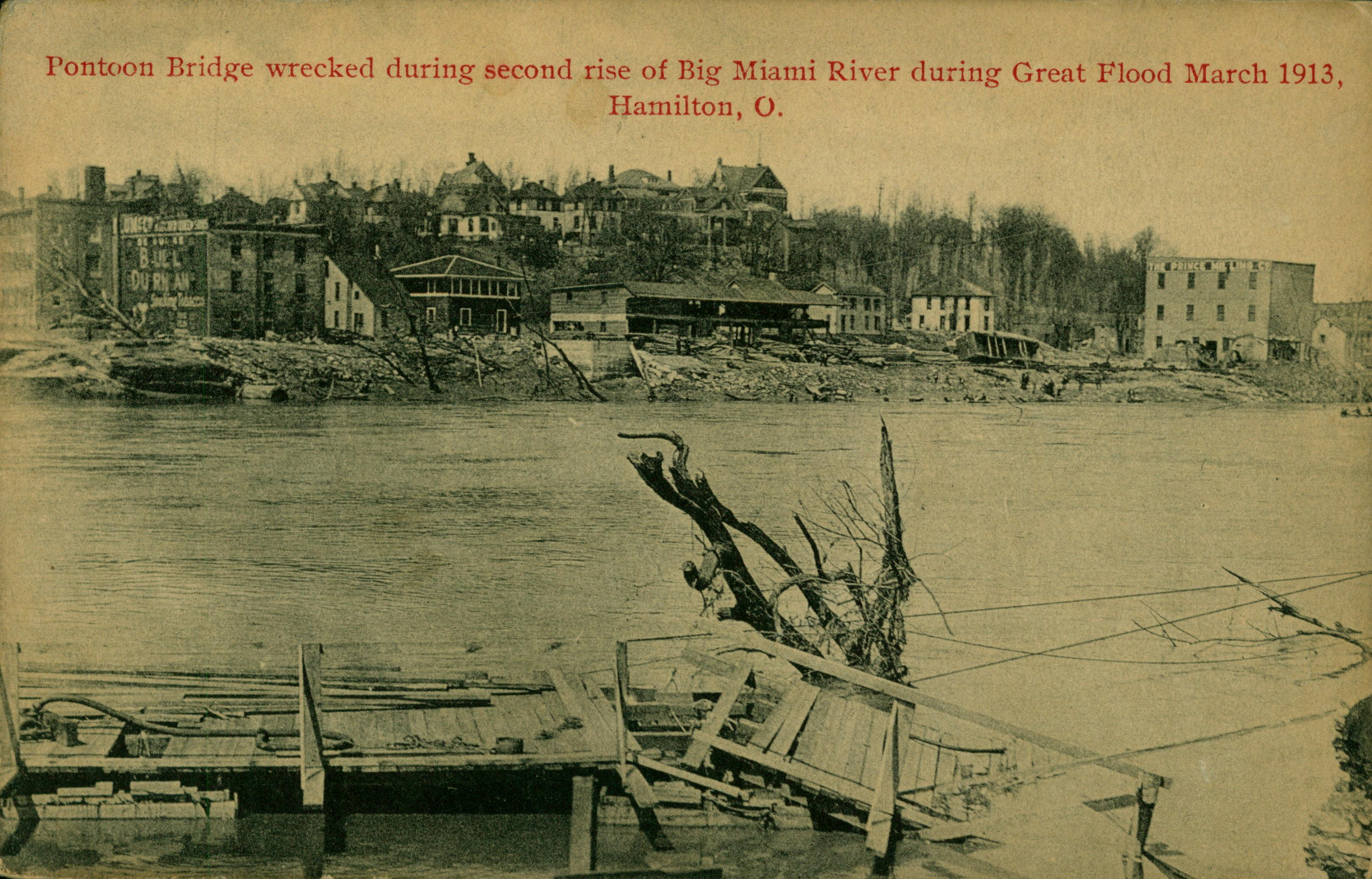
Wrecked pontoon bridge

Following the 1913 flood, residents realized that the only way to prevent future flooding was to deal with protection on a watershed basis. Citizens from all the major cities in the Miami Valley—Piqua, Troy, Dayton, Carlisle, Franklin, Miamisburg, Middletown, and Hamilton—gathered together to find a solution and worked with legislative representatives to draft enabling legislation to create the Miami Conservancy District. The legislation was passed by the state and signed into law by Governor James Cox. The Miami Conservancy District withstood several legal challenges, and by 1915, it hired an engineering staff to develop plans for valley-long channel improvements, levees, and storage basins to temporarily retain excessive rains. The system was designed to withstand rains and flows that would be up to 40% greater than those of the 1913 flood. It was completed in 1923. Since then, the system has retained excess water more than 1,000 times, thereby preventing flooding. The Miami Conservancy District was the first of its kind in the nation and has been an example of flood-control protection. It is unique for having been developed, built, and supported financially just by those who benefit. The Miami Conservancy District is financially supported by an assessment on each property that was affected by the 1913 flood, related to the present value of the property because it is not at risk of flooding. All the other areas within the district are assessed because they benefit by reducing or eliminating danger to infrastructure, commerce, and transportation.

=== 20th century to present ===
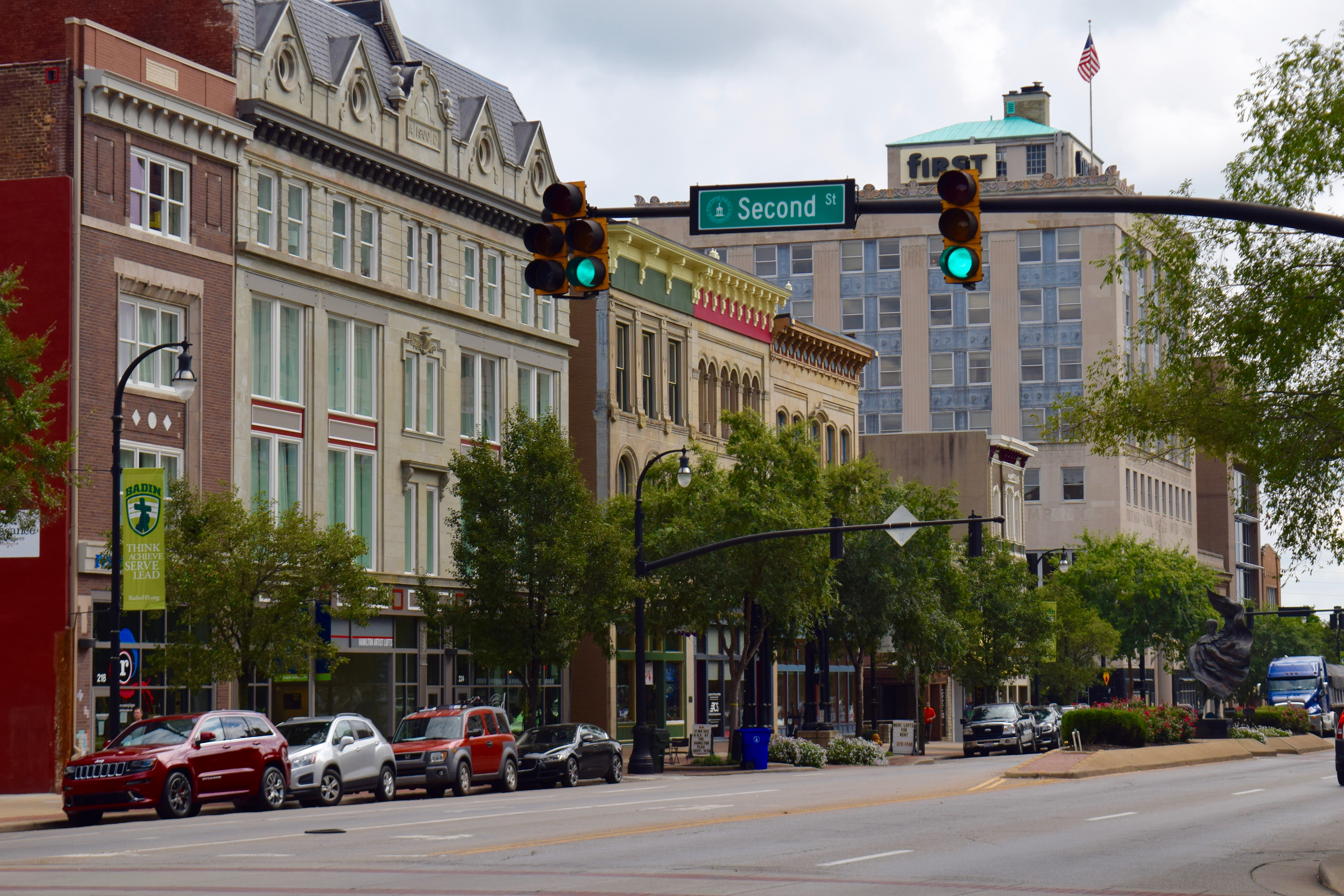
High Street in downtown Hamilton, 2016

In the 1920s, many Chicago gangsters established second homes in Hamilton. This gave Hamilton the nickname "Little Chicago". Some of these men appeared to have invested in what became an active district of gambling and prostitution. During World War II, the military declared the entire city off-limits to its enlisted personnel because of its numerous gambling and prostitution establishments. Madame Freeze's and the long row of prostitution houses along Wood Street (now called Pershing Avenue) were notorious among soldiers. Factories in Hamilton converted their operations to support the war effort, manufacturing military supplies, such as tank turrets, Liberty ship and submarine engines, and machined and stamped metal parts.

With the 1950s came the construction of the new interstate highway, I-75, part of the nationwide system. It bypassed Hamilton following a decision made to reduce traffic through the city. As a result, businesses were drawn to areas outside Hamilton with easier access to I-75. Until 1999, when the Butler County Veterans Highway was built, Hamilton was the second-largest city in the United States without direct interstate access.

In the late 20th century, industrial restructuring in heavy manufacturing resulted in widespread loss of jobs in older industrial cities, as operations were merged, relocated, and finally moved offshore. Like other Rust Belt cities in the northern tier, Hamilton has struggled to develop a new economy after such wide-scale changes, but it has retained more of its population than many such cities. In addition, since the late 20th century, it has attracted new immigrants, primarily from Mexico and Central America.

On March 30, 1975, Easter Sunday, James Ruppert murdered 11 family members in his mother's house at 635 Minor Avenue in Hamilton, in what is referred to as the "Easter Sunday Massacre". The murders shocked the town of Hamilton and the entire country. This was the deadliest shooting inside a private residence in American history.

On May 28, 1986, as part of a plan to increase publicity about Hamilton and boost its revitalization, the City Council voted 5 to 1 in favor of adding an exclamation point to the city's name, similar to the popular musical Oklahoma!. Thus, Hamilton officially became Hamilton!. While at the time used extensively in the city's documents, letterheads, business cards, and on local signage, the United States Board on Geographic Names did not include the exclamation point, nor did Rand McNally maps. The exclamation point is generally no longer used. It is not in use on the Hamilton municipal website.

In 2009 and 2015, the city won the Berkeley Springs International Water Tasting Awards for best-tasting municipal water for the United States; and in 2010, the gold medal for the best tasting water in the world. They also placed third (second-best in America) in 2014, 2017, and 2018; and fifth in 2022.

== Geography ==
According to the United States Census Bureau, the city has a total area of 22.08 square miles (57.19 km^{2}), of which 0.48 square miles (1.24 km^{2}) is covered by water. It lies along the Great Miami River.

== Demographics ==
Historical population
Census	Pop.	Note	%±
1820	660		—
1830	1,079		63.5%
1840	1,406		30.3%
1850	3,210		128.3%
1860	7,223		125.0%
1870	11,081		53.4%
1880	12,122		9.4%
1890	17,565		44.9%
1900	23,914		36.1%
1910	35,279		47.5%
1920	39,675		12.5%
1930	52,176		31.5%
1940	40,592		−22.2%
1950	57,951		42.8%
1960	72,345		24.8%
1970	67,865		−6.2%
1980	63,189		−6.9%
1990	61,436		−2.8%
2000	60,690		−1.2%
2010	62,447		2.9%
2020	63,399		1.5%
2025 (est.)	64,644		2.0%

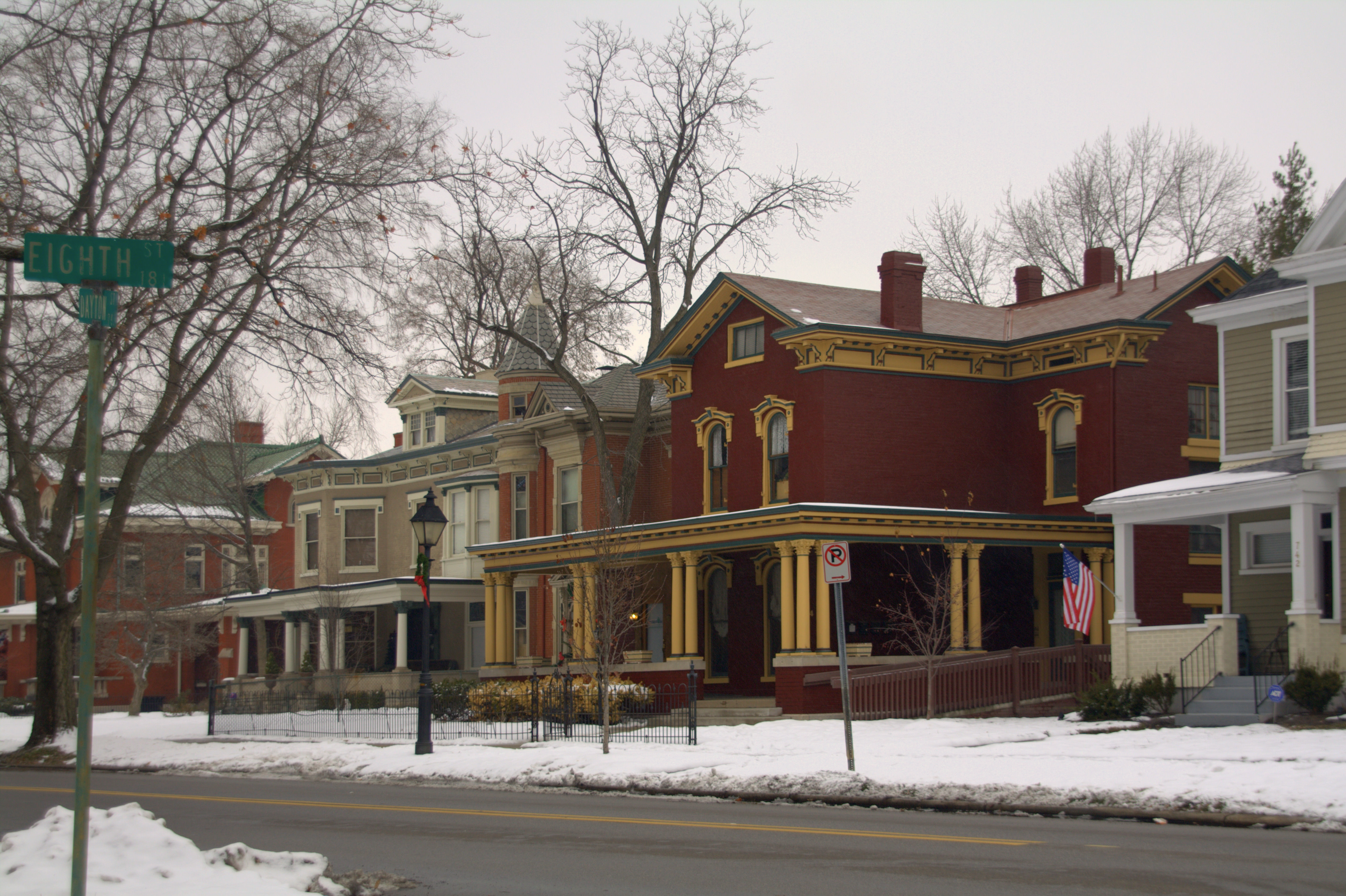
Dayton–Campbell Historic District, 2010

=== 2020 census ===
As of the 2020 census, Hamilton had a population of 63,399 and a population density of 2,955.66 people per square mile (1,141.18/km^{2}). The city had 27,392 housing units, of which 7.6% were vacant; the homeowner vacancy rate was 1.8%, and the rental vacancy rate was 6.4%. Almost all of the residents lived in urban areas, while 0.4% lived in rural areas.

As of the 2020 census, 25,299 households were in Hamilton, of which 29.9% had children under 18 living in them, 35.0% were married-couple households, 21.6% were households with a male householder and no spouse or partner present, and 33.5% were households with a female householder and no spouse or partner present. About 32.6% of all households were made up of individuals, and 12.3% had someone living alone who was 65 or older.

As of the 2020 census, the median age was 37.2 years; 23.5% of residents were under 18 and 15.6% were 65 or older. For every 100 females, there were 95.7 males, and for every 100 females 18 and over, there were 93.8 males.

Racial composition as of the 2020 census
Race	Number	Percentage
White	47,309	74.6%
Black or African American	6,271	9.9%
American Indian and Alaska Native	396	0.6%
Asian	581	0.9%
Native Hawaiian and Other Pacific Islander	256	0.4%
Some other race	3,838	6.1%
Two or more races	4,748	7.5%
Hispanic or Latino (of any race)	6,331	10.0%

According to the U.S. Census American Community Survey, for the period 2016–2020, the estimated median annual income for a household in the city was $52,995 and for a family was $62,579. About 19.6% of the population were living below the poverty line, including 29.3% of those under 18 and 8.3% of those 65 or over. About 56.3% of the population were employed, and 14.9% had a bachelor's degree or higher.

=== 2010 census ===
As of the 2010 census, 62,477 people, 24,658 households, and 15,489 families were residing in the city. The population density was 2,892.5 inhabitants per square mile (1,116.8/km^{2}). The 27,878 housing units had an average density of 1,290.6 per square mile (498.3/km^{2}). The racial makeup of the city was 84.0% White, 8.5% African American, 0.2% Native American, 0.6% Asian, 0.1% Pacific Islander, 3.6% from other races, and 2.9% from two or more races. Hispanics or Latinos of any race were 6.4% of the population.

Of the 24,658 households, 32.9% had children under 18 living with them, 39.3% were married couples living together, 17.3% had a female householder with no husband present, 6.2% had a male householder with no wife present, and 37.2% were not families. About 30.6% of all households were made up of individuals, and 10.8% had someone living alone who was 65 or older. The average household size was 2.47, and the average family size was 3.06.

The median age in the city was 35.3 years; 24.9% of residents were under 18, 9.4% were between 18 and 24, 27.6% were from 25 to 44, 24.9% were from 45 to 64, and 13.2% were 65 or older. The gender makeup of the city was 48.8% male and 51.2% female.

=== 2000 census ===
As of the 2000 census, 60,690 people, 24,188 households, and 15,867 families were living in the city. The population density was 2,808.2 inhabitants per square mile (1,084.3/km^{2}). The 25,913 housing units had an average density of 1,199.0 per square mile (462.9/km^{2}). The racial makeup of the city was 88.94% White, 7.55% African American, 0.29% Native American, 0.45% Asian, 0.04% Pacific Islander, 1.46% from other races, and 1.28% from two or more races. Hispanic or Latino of any race were 2.58% of the population.

Of the 24,188 households, 31.5% had children under 18 living with them, 45.5% were married couples living together, 15.3% had a female householder with no husband present, and 34.4% were not families. About 29.3% of all households were made up of individuals, and 11.7% had someone living alone who was 65 or older. The average household size was 2.45, and the average family size was 3.02.

In the city, the age distribution was 25.8% under 18, 9.8% from 18 to 24, 29.9% from 25 to 44, 20.2% from 45 to 64, and 14.3% who were 65 or older. The median age was 35 years. For every 100 females, there were 92.6 males. For every 100 females 18 and over, there were 89.1 males.

The median income in the city for a household was $35,365 and for a family was $41,936. Males had a median income of $32,646 versus $23,850 for females. The per capita income for the city was $17,493. About 10.6% of families and 13.4% of the population were below the poverty line, including 18.1% of those under 18 and 9.8% of those 65 or over.

== Arts and culture ==
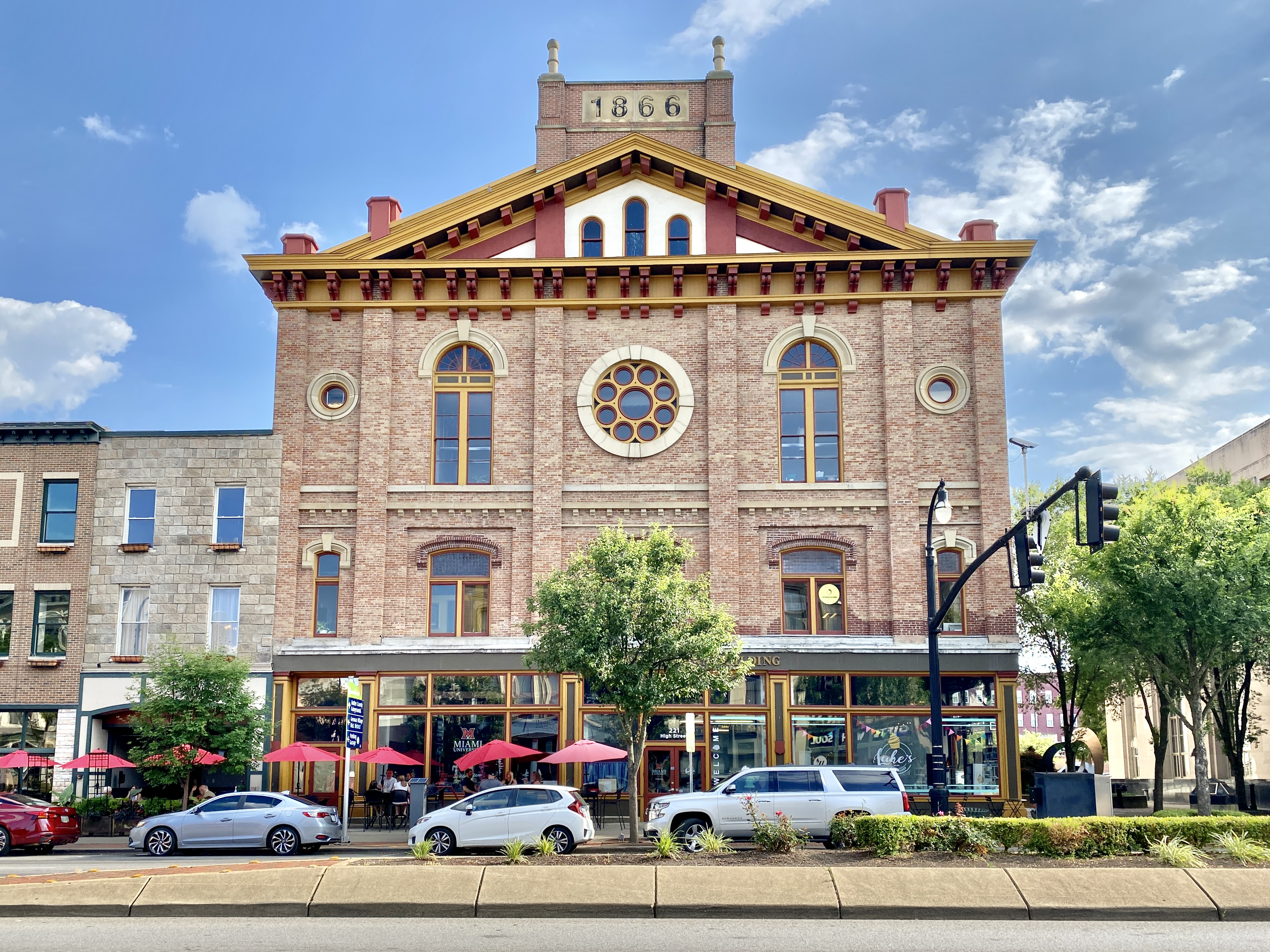
The Robinson-Schwenn Building was originally built as an opera house.

Hamilton has three designated Historic Districts: Dayton Lane, German Village, and Rossville. The industrial city is seeking to revitalize through the arts; it declared itself the "City of Sculpture" in 2000. That initiative has since attracted many sculpture installations to the city, which founded the Pyramid Hill Sculpture Park.

=== Library system ===
The Lane Public Library is located in an architecturally significant building in the heart of German Village. Built in 1866 by local philanthropist Robert Clark Lane, the library building has since been improved by six separate renovations and expansion projects. Lane donated the first collection of materials to the library, around 3,000 books. Today, the collection numbers over 123,000. It has a local history room, which also has materials related to genealogy. The library also features the Lane Libraries Community Technology Center, located on the ground floor of the historic Robinson-Schwenn Building in downtown Hamilton.

== Sports ==
Hamilton was home to minor league baseball in 1884, 1889, 1911, and 1913, as the Hamilton Mechanics played as members of the Ohio State League.

The Hamilton Joes are a collegiate summer baseball team that competes in the Great Lakes Summer Collegiate League, which is one of eight leagues formed under the National Alliance of College Summer Baseball. The club was named after Cincinnati Reds baseball player and broadcaster Joe Nuxhall. The Joes' inaugural season was in 2009. They won the league championship in 2010 and 2016. Forty former Joes have been drafted or signed into professional baseball.

West Side Little League of Hamilton has been to the Little League World Series contested in South Williamsport, Pennsylvania, in 1991, 1993, 2007, 2010, 2021, and 2026. In 2021, they won the Tom Seaver bracket and advanced to the championship game, where they lost to a team from Taylor, Michigan. In 2026, the Hamilton team finished as runner-up in the U.S. Championship, and placed fourth in the overall series. West Side Little League has also won the state championship 19 times since 1988 in the majors division.

== Government ==
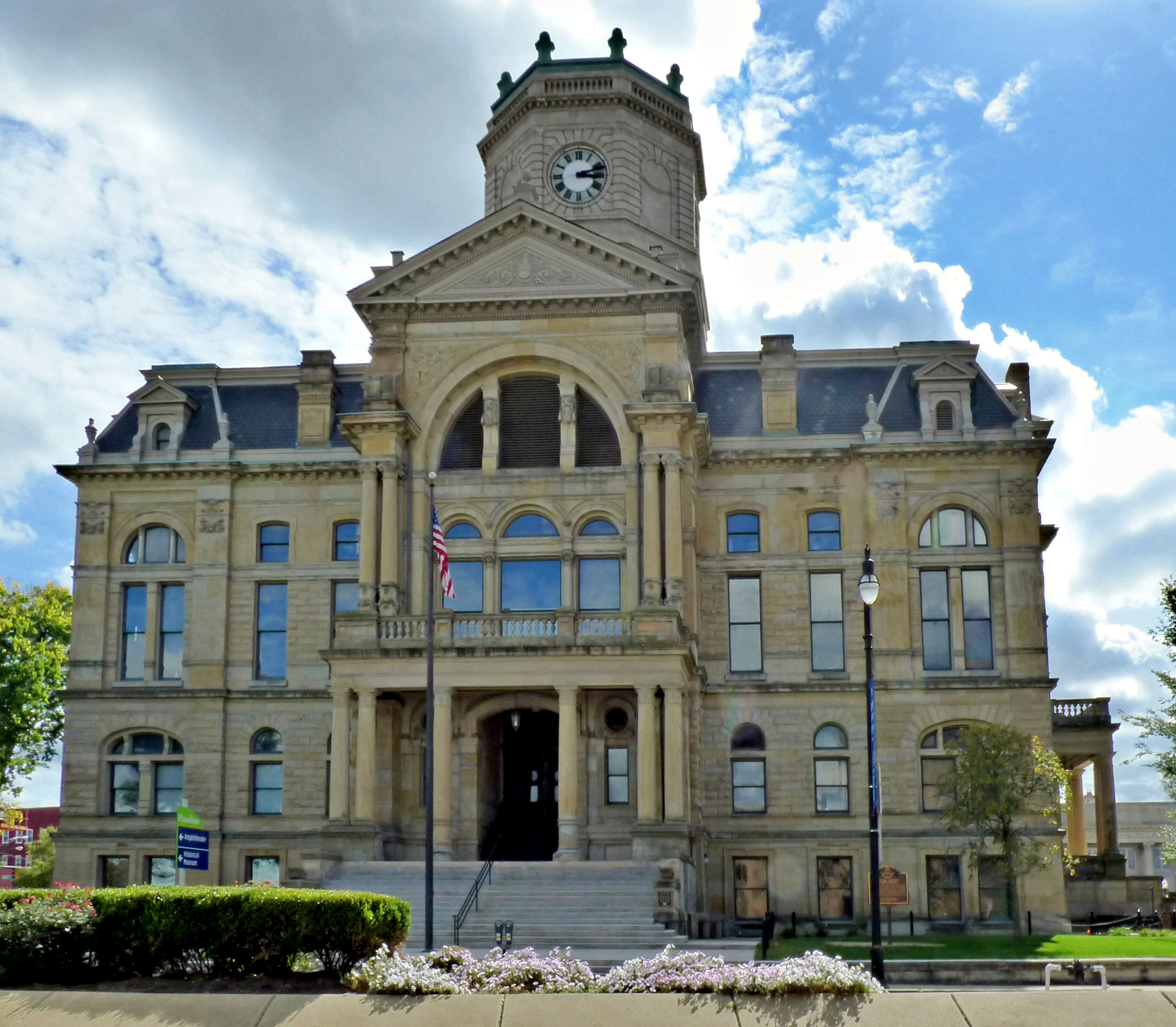
Butler County Courthouse, 2015

Hamilton City Council consists of seven members elected in nonpartisan elections at staggered intervals and serve four-year terms. They elect a mayor within the council, and together select and appoint a professional city manager to operate the city. Operating as the legislative branch of the city, the council provides policy direction to the city manager. The judge of the municipal court is also an elected official. The city manager operates as chief executive officer, directing a workforce of more than 675 permanent employees and a $400+ million budget. The city also maintains a public safety director for the city, responsible for police protection, staffed by more than 110 full-time professionals, and fire protection, staffed by more than 110 full-time firefighters.

The current mayor of Hamilton is Patrick Moeller and the city manager is Craig R. Bucheit.

The city's council-manager government was established in 1926, based then on election by proportional representation with a single transferable vote. This system was developed to try to meet the rapidly changing needs of cities with their growing immigrant populations. "The PR STV ballot allows voters to rank order their choices in either at-large or multimember district elections. With each ballot ultimately counting toward the election of one candidate, voters' preferences can be transferred to second or subsequent choices if their most preferred candidate is already elected or has no chance of election, thus maximizing the proportion of effective votes and permitting minorities to win their share of seats."

Hamilton was one of several major Ohio cities that adopted the single transferable vote form of elections in the early 20th century; Ashtabula was the first in 1915. This system was considered more progressive than plurality voting, with winner take all, and the at-large election system found in some cities, which also benefited the majority and generally succeeded in preventing minorities from gaining office. Use of single transferable vote resulted in more minorities, including women, being able to enter politics and attain positions on city councils, which they likely otherwise would not have gained in at-large voting. Under the Voting Rights Act of 1965, a significant minority is that representing 5% or more of the population.

The success of single transferable vote nationally led to a political backlash from bosses and parties that lost power. In Hamilton, opponents mounted numerous campaigns to repeal the charter, finally succeeding after four failed referendums in 12 years. Since the city of Hamilton returned to plurality voting, the African-American minority has less frequently been able to win seats on the council. In 2015, however, city council members include two women (white) and an African-American man; other members are white males.

== Education ==
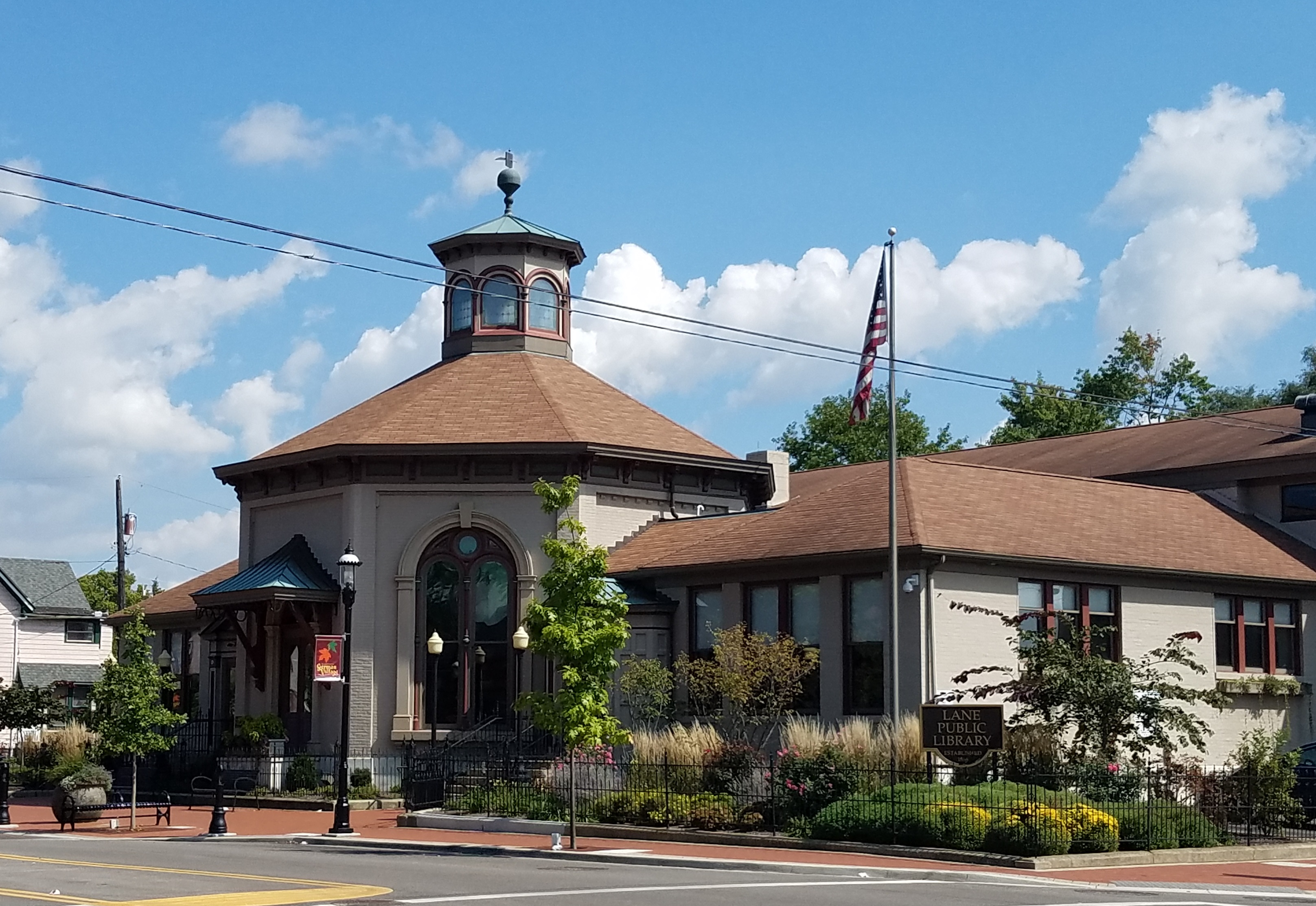
Lane Public Library in German Village, 2017

Hamilton is served by the Hamilton City School District, which operates Hamilton High School. The district has underway a major $200 million capital program including the construction of eight elementary schools, a freshman school, two completely renovated middle schools, and an upgraded high school with two new gyms, a new media center, six new classrooms, and a new cafeteria. In 2002, President George W. Bush visited Hamilton and signed the No Child Left Behind Act into law at Hamilton High School.

The Talawanda City School District and Talawanda High School in Oxford, Ohio, serves a small portion of the city. The Ross Local School District and Ross High School operate outside the city proper, serving a small portion of the city and surrounding rural area.

Father Stephen T. Badin High School, a private Catholic high school of the Archdiocese of Cincinnati, and several Catholic elementary schools (St. Ann Catholic School, St. Peter in Chains School, St. Joseph Consolidated School, Sacred Heart of Jesus School, and Queen of Peace School), serve the city and surrounding area.

Miami University, based in Oxford, Ohio, has a regional campus in Hamilton. Miami University Hamilton opened in 1968 and now has more than 5,000 students.

== Transportation ==
Hamilton station is currently unused. It previously serviced passenger trains to Detroit (until 1971), Chicago, Washington, and New York City (until 2005).

The Butler County Regional Transit Authority provides bus service in the city with connections to Middletown, Oxford, as well as Springdale, where riders can transfer to the Southwest Ohio Regional Transit Authority, which serves greater Cincinnati.

== Notable people ==
- Denicos Allen, linebacker for Michigan State University
- William Allen (1827–1881), United States Congressman
- Lucky Baldwin (1828–1909) California tycoon
- Jim Blount, newspaper editor
- Leroy "Sugarfoot" Bonner, guitarist (Ohio Players)
- Frank Clair, former Canadian Football League coach
- Ray Combs (1956–1996), comedian and second host of Family Feud
- Aaron Cook, professional baseball player
- Thomas Eugene Creech, serial killer on death row in Idaho
- Sheehan Donoghue, Wisconsin assemblyman
- Robert Dove, parliamentarian of the U.S. Senate
- Greg Dulli, musician
- Byron Elliott, Justice of the Indiana Supreme Court
- Warren Gard (1873–1929), United States congressman, lawyer
- Kevin Grevey, professional basketball player
- Ronald Hamilton, opera singer
- Jon Hoke, secondary coach for the Atlanta Falcons
- William Dean Howells, author
- Fannie Hurst, author
- Steven Ittel, organometallic chemist
- David Klarich, politician from Missouri
- Eric Lange, actor (Lost, Victorious)
- Mark Lewis, professional baseball player
- Joshua L. Liebman, rabbi
- Rick Lynch, US Army lieutenant general
- John Martinkovic, NFL player
- Robert McCloskey (1914–2003), author and illustrator of children's books
- Patrick McCollum, nationally recognized naturalist, conservationist
- Kevin McGuff, women's college basketball coach at Ohio State University
- Steve Morse, guitarist
- William Pitt Murray, Minnesota politician and lawyer
- Pamela Myers, actress
- Jane Nelson, Texas secretary of state
- Joe Nuxhall, professional baseball player
- Adam Pankey, NFL offensive tackle
- Patricia Parris, voice actress
- Mark Peck, New Zealand member of Parliament
- Nan Phelps, artist
- Katherine K. Preston, musicologist
- Floyd "Breezy" Reid, American football running back
- Frederick Rentschler, aircraft engine designer, aviation engineer, and industrialist
- Charles Richter, seismologist and creator of Richter scale
- Glen Edward Rogers (1962–2025), American serial killer
- Bonnie Rotten, pornographic actress
- James Ruppert (1934–2022), murderer
- George A. Sanderson, 13th secretary of the United States Senate
- Paul Sarringhaus, NFL player
- Hayden Senger, catcher for the New York Mets
- David Shaw, musician
- Fannie Douglass Smith, journalist
- Simon Stepaniak, NFL player
- Van Stephenson, musician
- John Cleves Symmes Jr., soldier, philosopher
- Pat Tabler, professional baseball player and broadcaster
- Jim Tracy, professional baseball player and manager
- Roger Troutman, singer, songwriter
- Scott Walker, musician, singer, member of the Walker Brothers
- Tyler Walker, American football coach
- Brad Warner, zen priest and author
- Andrew R. Wheeler, lawyer and acting administrator of the United States Environmental Protection Agency
- Jane Delaplaine Wilson, author, daughter of Joshua Deleplane, one of the pioneer settlers of Ohio
- Jimmy Wynn, MLB player
