= Robinson-Schwenn Building =

- Dixon–Globe Opera House – Robinson–Schwenn Building
- U.S. National Register of Historic Places
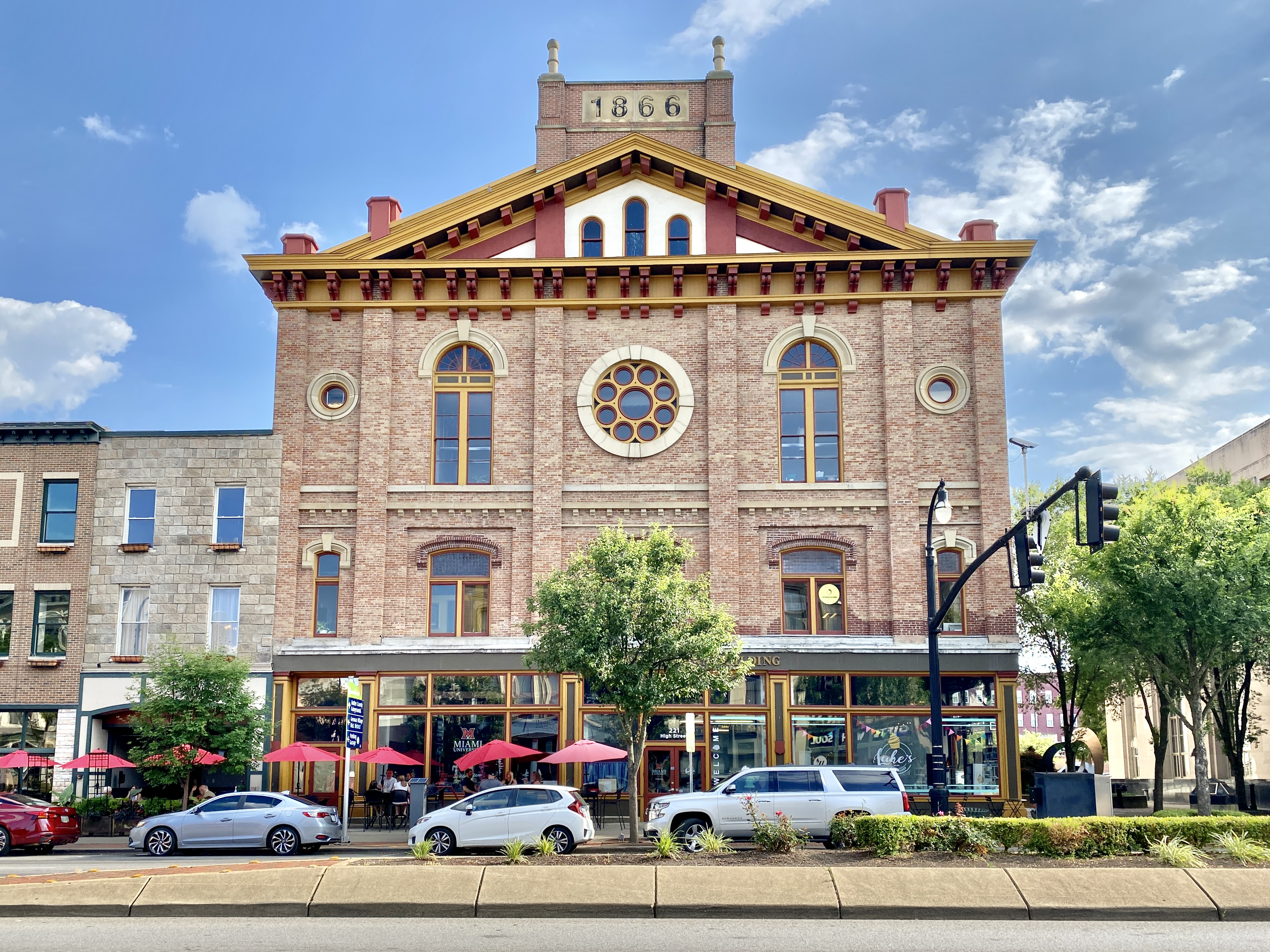

- Location within Ohio Location within the United States
- Location: 221 High St., Hamilton, Ohio
- Coordinates: 39°23′58″N 84°33′39″W
- Built: 1866
- Architect: Frederick Mueller, Joseph Bender and Company
- Architectural style: Italianate, Romanesque
- NRHP reference No.: 00000799
- Added to NRHP: July 14, 2000

The Robinson–Schwenn Building is a historic building in Hamilton, Ohio. It was originally erected in 1866 as the Dixon Opera House and was later renamed to the Globe Opera House. The building was listed in the National Register of Historic Places on July 14, 2000. It was renovated in 2012–2013 and is currently used by Miami University as an arts and community center.
