= Jane Delaplaine Wilson =

American author (1830–1915)

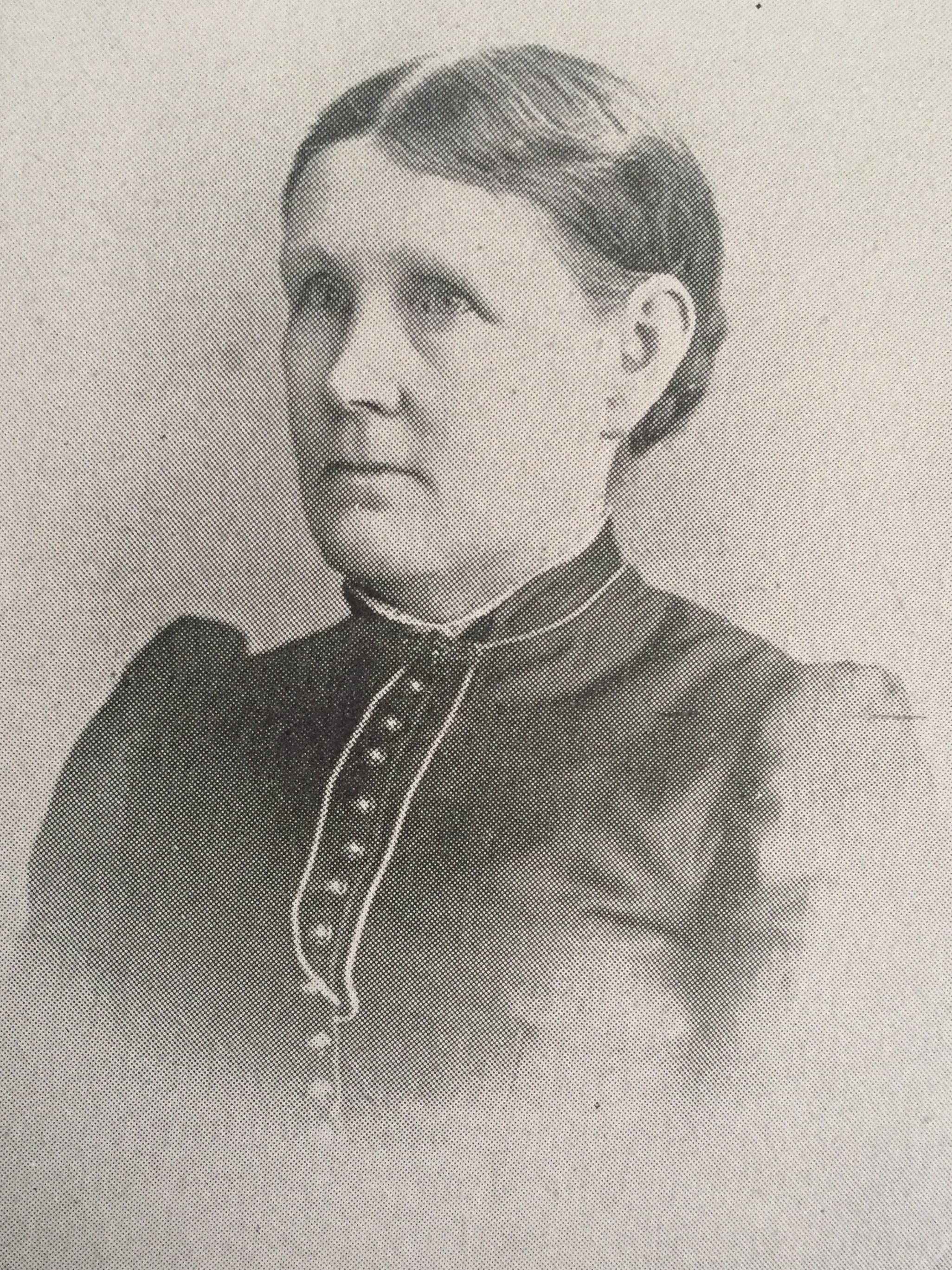
Jane Delaplaine Wilson

Jane Delaplaine Wilson (July 17, 1830 - March 30, 1915) was an author.

== Early life ==
Jane Delaplaine was born in Hamilton, Ohio, on July 17, 1830, the daughter of Joshua Deleplane, one of the pioneer settlers of Ohio.

She was educated in the academy for young women in her native town.

== Career ==
As a child Jane Delaplaine Wilson was inclined to literature, and during youth she wrote much, which was never allowed to see the light. In 1880 she began to publish short stories and poems under the pen-name "Mrs. Lawrence". After using that name for a short time, she laid it aside and signed her work with her husband's initials. Both her poems and stories were widely copied. She contributed to a number of periodicals.

== Personal life ==
On May 12, 1847, at 17 years old, Jane Delaplaine became the wife of Elias Vickers Wilson (1824–1885), then a lawyer. They moved to northeastern Missouri, where they settled in Edina, Missouri. Her husband became a judge.

Their children are: Mary L. Wilson Armstrong (1848–1902), William Wilson (1850–1915), Edwin Wilson (1853–1853), Vickers C. Wilson (1854–1897), John D. Wilson (1856–1860), Frederick J. Wilson (1863–1907), Catherine A. Wilson Campbell (1866–1941), Charles Irving Wilson (1868–1927), Frank Alwood Wilson (1871–1948).

She died on March 30, 1915, in Sedalia, Missouri, and is buried at Linville Cemetery, Edina.
