= Hamilton High School (Hamilton, Ohio) =

Public, coeducational high school in Hamilton, Ohio, United States

Location
- 1165 Eaton Avenue; Hamilton, (Butler County), Ohio 45013; United States; 39°25′31″N 84°34′42″W

Information
- Type: Public, Coeducational high school
- School district: Hamilton City School District
- CEEB code: 362493
- Principal: Jon Szary
- Teaching staff: 125.50 (FTE)
- Grades: 10-12
- Student to teacher ratio: 22.11
- Colors: Blue and White
- Athletics conference: Greater Miami Conference
- Mascot: Big Blue Bull Dog (unofficial)
- Nickname: The Big Blue
- Team name: Big Blue
- Accreditation: North Central Association of Colleges and Schools
- Publication: Blueprints (Literary Magazine)
- Newspaper: Big Blue Bulletin
- Yearbook: Heritage
- Website: Official website

Hamilton High School is a public high school in Hamilton, Ohio. It is the only high school in the Hamilton City School District. It was the school in which then-President George W. Bush signed the No Child Left Behind Act on January 8, 2002.

== History ==
The present building on Eaton Avenue opened as Taft High School in 1959. Taft served the west side of Hamilton while Garfield High School on Fair Avenue served the east. Both were consolidated to form Hamilton High School in 1980.

In 2002, an addition was built across the school's front, giving it new entrances, a new façade, a new library/media center, and six new classrooms. A new fine arts wing was finished in 2004. A recent bond issue approved the construction of a new gymnasium and to convert the old gym into a larger cafeteria. In 2012, the school began construction on the new gymnasium and lunch room. It concluded in 2013.

Hamilton had a high school at the corner of S. Second and Ludlow Streets downtown until 1915 when a new building was constructed at N. Sixth and Dayton Streets. The high school remained there until 1959, when Hamilton's population swelled and two high schools became necessary.

== Athletics ==
The Hamilton Big Blue compete in the Greater Miami Conference. The Big Blue have captured over 80 conference championships since 1966.

=== OHSAA State Championships ===
- Boys Basketball - 2004, 1962(Hamilton Taft), 1954, 1949, 1937
- Boys Baseball - 1997, 1983
- Boys Golf - 1948
- Girls Softball - 1985
- Girls Bowling - 2022

== Performing arts ==
Hamilton, at one point, had three competitive show choirs: the mixed-gender Prestige, the all-female Vocal Elegance and the all-male CrescenDudes. This was until the 2023-2024 school year when Vocal Elegance and CrescenDudes were replaced with the a cappelle group, Enharmonix. The school hosts its own competition, the Double H Showcase . for show choir, where the middle school show choir competes on a Friday and the high school show choir competes on a Sunday, showcasing Enharmonix in between breaks for the competing high school show choirs.

== Notable alumni ==
- Denicos Allen, football player
- Ray Combs, comedian and game show host
- Aaron Cook, baseball player
- Kevin Grevey, basketball player
- Kaleb Johnson, football player
- Mark Lewis, baseball player
- Joe Nuxhall, baseball player and announcer
- Adam Pankey, football player
- Floyd Reid, football player
- Paul Sarringhaus, football player
- Ricky Stone, baseball player
- Malik Verdon, football player
