= Norwood, Ohio =

- City
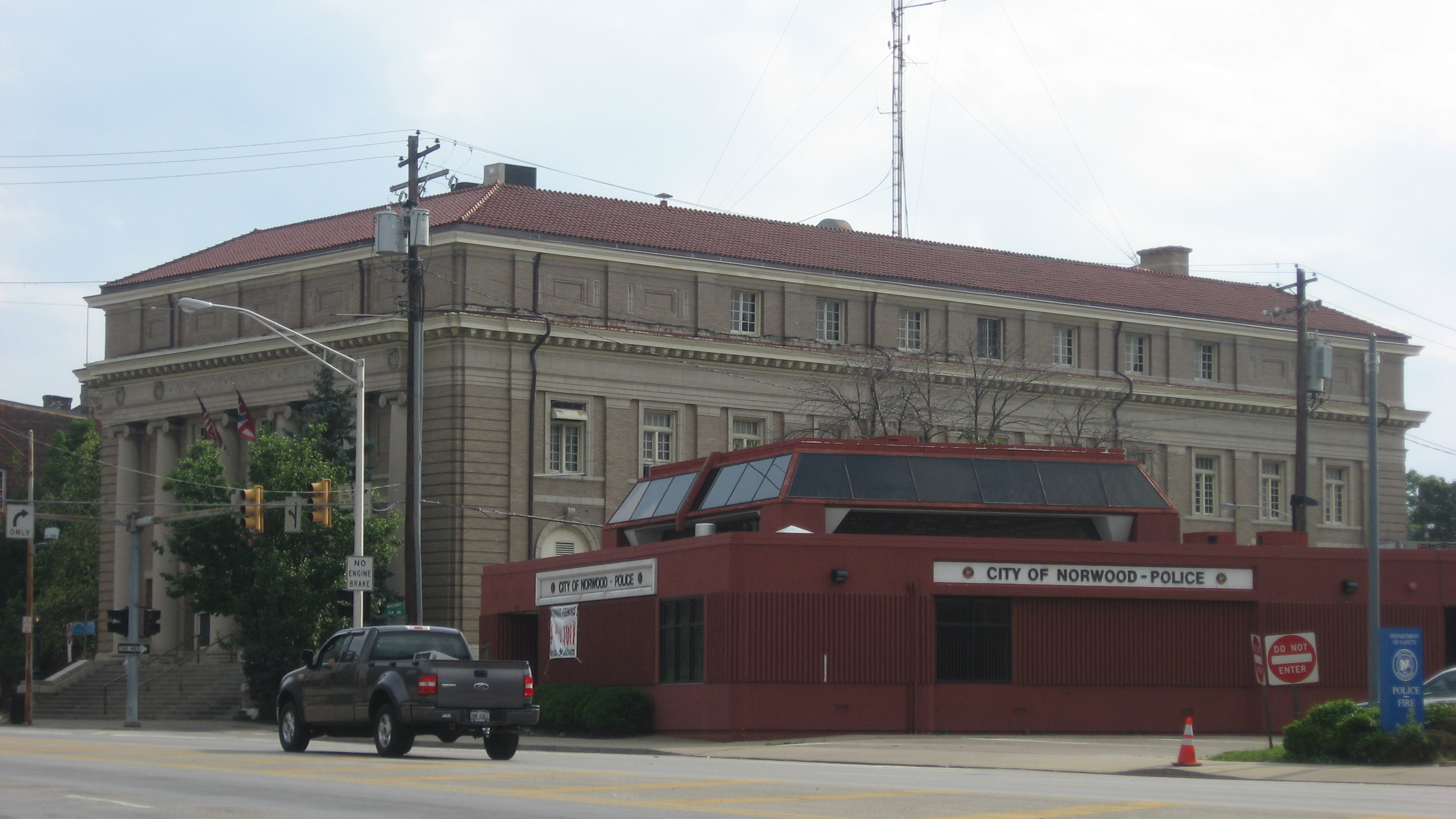
- Norwood Police Department and Norwood Municipal Building on Montgomery Road

- Flag Seal
- Nickname: Gem of the Highlands
- Interactive map of Norwood, Ohio
- Location within Ohio Location within the United States
- Coordinates: 39°9′36″N 84°27′18″W
- Country: United States
- State: Ohio
- County: Hamilton
- Established: 1888

Government
  - Mayor: Victor Schneider (R)

Area
  - Total: 3.14 sq mi (8.14 km^{2})
  - Land: 3.14 sq mi (8.14 km^{2})
  - Water: 0 sq mi (0.00 km^{2})
- Elevation: 660 ft (200 m)

Population (2020)
  - Total: 19,043
  - Estimate (2022): 19,108
  - Density: 6,058.8/sq mi (2,339.33/km^{2})
- Time zone: UTC−5 (Eastern (EST))
  - Summer (DST): UTC−4 (EDT)
- ZIP codes: 45212, 45207
- Area code: 513
- FIPS code: 39-57386
- GNIS feature ID: 1056460
- Website: norwoodohio.gov

Norwood is a city in Hamilton County, Ohio, United States, and an enclave of Cincinnati. The population was 19,043 at the 2020 census, making it the third-most populous city in Hamilton County. Originally settled as an early suburb of Cincinnati in the wooded countryside north of the city, the area is characterized by older homes and tree-lined streets.

== History ==
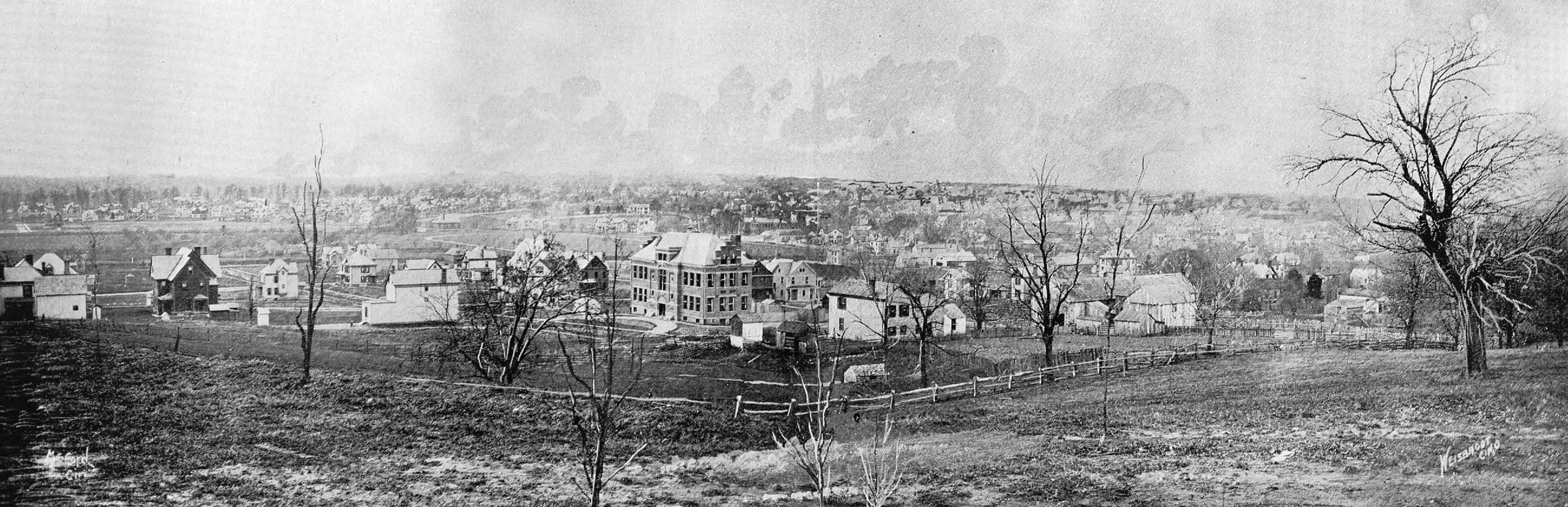
An 1894 panoramic photo of early Norwood, looking southwest from Grandview Place near Indian Mound. Many of Norwood's streets and neighborhoods were not yet platted at the time this photo was taken. The original North Norwood School on Marion Avenue (built 1891) is visible in the center of the photo. The large field with the oval track in the distance behind the school is the former Norwood Park, which was used for baseball games, outdoor theater, and traveling circuses. Norwood Park was later replaced by the General Motors Norwood Assembly Plant and today is the site of the Grande Central Station shopping center.

=== Early history ===
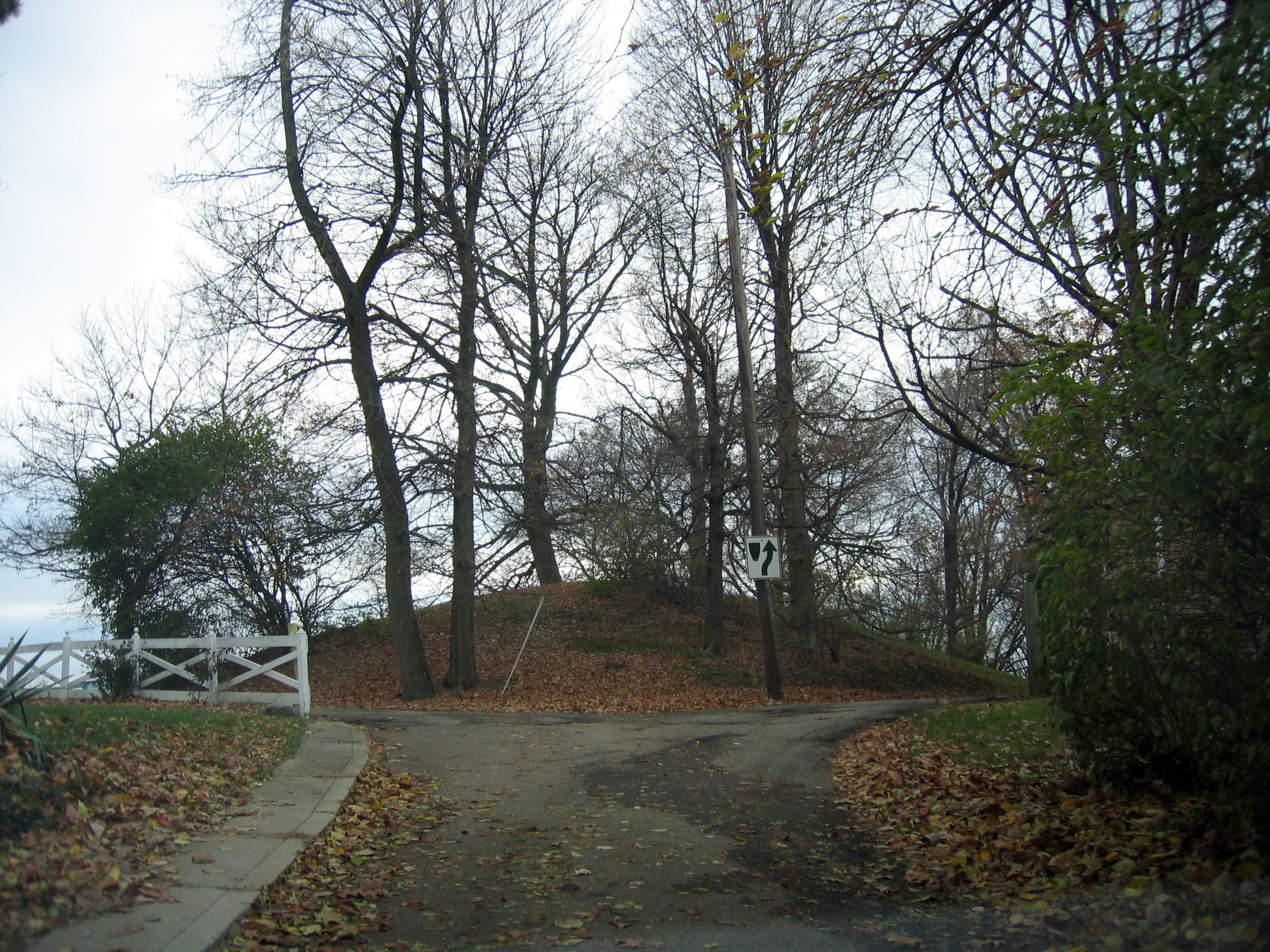
Norwood Mound was constructed by people of the prehistoric Adena culture and was likely used for religious ceremonies and smoke signaling

The earliest humans in the area now known as Norwood are believed to have been Pre-Columbian era people of the Adena culture. Norwood Mound, a prehistoric earthwork mound built by the Adena, is located in Norwood and listed on the National Register of Historic Places. The Adena constructed the mound at the location of Norwood's present-day Water Tower Park, which is the highest land elevation in the city. Archaeologists believe the mound was built at this site due to the high elevation and was used by the Adena for religious ceremonies and smoke signaling.

Several Native American mounds were located in Downtown Cincinnati at the time of arrival of the first white settlers. However, by 1895, the Norwood Mound was the only remaining mound in the vicinity of Cincinnati. The mound has never been excavated, but it is reported that many artifacts found in the area by early Norwood settlers in the 1800s made up the original nucleus of the Native American Art Collection of the Cincinnati Art Museum. In the early-20th century, Norwood High School named their sports team mascot the Indians in honor of this local Native American heritage.

=== Sharpsburg settlement ===
In 1787, the United States Congress established the Northwest Territory, and John Cleves Symmes, Congressman from New Jersey, purchased 311,682 acres (126,133 ha) of the territory (the Symmes Purchase), within which the future Norwood is located. One year later, the first permanent settlement on the banks of the Ohio River in what would later become Cincinnati was established. In 1793, General "Mad Anthony" Wayne led several companies of troops from Fort Washington in Cincinnati to advance against a hostile tribe of Native Americans encamped on the banks of the nearby Millcreek in what is now St. Bernard. Historians believe that a company of troops under the direction of General Wayne made their way through Norwood during this campaign and widened an old Native American trail, which followed the path of present-day Smith Road, Montgomery Road, and Carthage Avenue.

In 1794, a pioneer named Peter Smith settled on Duck Creek in or near the current location of Norwood. It is believed he is one of the earliest Norwood settlers, if not the first. Soon after, a road was built connecting the early settlement of Columbia on the Ohio River near the Little Miami River with the settlement of Carthage, just north of Cincinnati. This road cut through Norwood along the old Indian Path widened by General Wayne's troops. Anthony Wayne's victory over the Indians at the Battle of Fallen Timbers the same year signaled the end of the Northwest Indian War which enabled pioneers to begin settling former hostile lands such as the future Norwood. In 1795, another road was built along the present-day path of Montgomery Road, connecting Cincinnati with Montgomery, Ohio and beyond. Montgomery Road was known as the "State Road" and Smith Road/Carthage Avenue was known as the "County Road."

In 1809, a settler named Samuel D. Bowman purchased land near the crossing of the State Road and the County Road, where he established a tavern and coach stop for travelers. He was soon joined by John Sharp, who built a cabin and country store at the opposite side of the intersection. The community of half a dozen houses soon became known as "Sharpsburg", after Sharp. For the next half century, the coach stop along the road between Cincinnati and Columbus remained small.

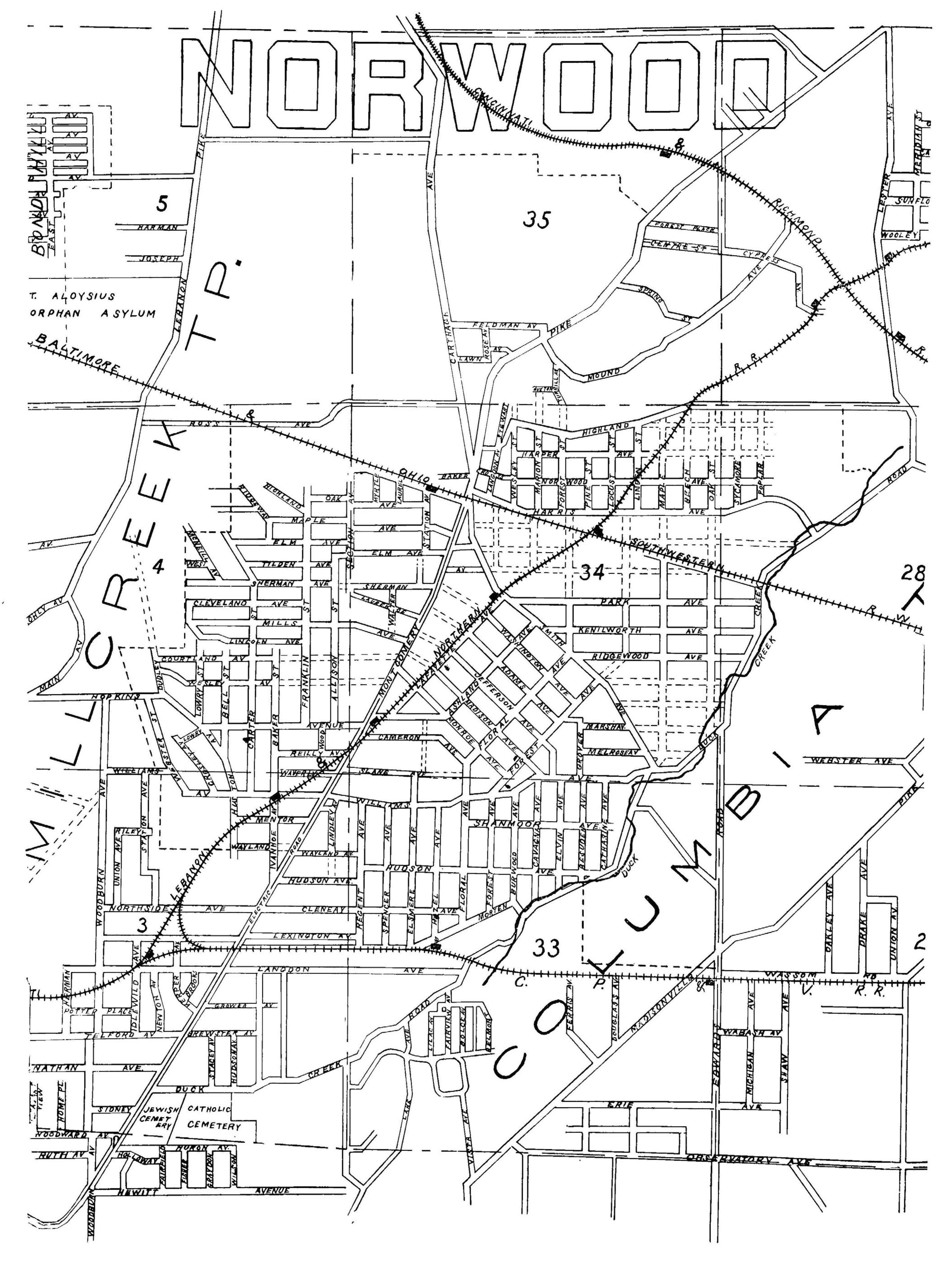
Norwood, as it first appeared c. 1888 when the city was incorporated as a village. Prior to incorporation, "Norwood" was only a collection of loosely organized subdivisions (Norwood Heights, East Norwood, South Norwood, Elsmere, etc.). Much of the city at the time of this map had yet to be developed.

=== Sharpsburg becomes Norwood ===
In 1866, the first tracks of the Marietta and Cincinnati Railroad were completed, connecting Loveland with Cincinnati. The tracks ran from east to west through Sharpsburg and still exist in the same location today, parallel to the Norwood Lateral Expressway and passing under the Montgomery Road overpass. The village did not initially have a train station when the railway opened, but the possibility of passenger rail access to Cincinnati generated interest in developing a residential subdivision nearby. In 1868, two early developments were platted in the area north of the railroad. The first train station was established that same year.

In 1869, Sylvester H. Parvin, Col. Philander P. Lane and Lemuel Bolles purchased the William Ferguson farm north of the Marietta and Cincinnati Railroad tracks and platted an eighty-one-acre subdivision they called Norwood Heights. This was the first recorded use of the name Norwood in the area. It is commonly believed that the person who came up with the name was Sarah Bolles, wife of Lemuel Bolles. In the 1894 book, Norwood, Her Homes and Her People, it was stated that the name "Sharpsburg" was "not considered pretty enough for such a spot, and the suggestion of the Bolles' to call it Norwood (an abbreviation of Northwood) met with endorsement, and so it was that the suburb was christened anew."

However, the origin of the name Norwood is commonly disputed. It is also stated that Mrs. Bolles's name for the 1869 Norwood Heights subdivision was inspired by Henry Ward Beecher's popular 1869 novel Norwood: or, Village Life in New England. Others have claimed Mrs. Bolles arrived at the name by combining "North Woods", in reference to Norwood being a wooded area north of Cincinnati. In any case, the new name Norwood was popular enough that the Cincinnati Enquirer reported in 1870 that "the old town of Sharpsburg has been changed to Norwood" and the Sharpsburg post office was officially renamed Norwood the same year. By 1873, a second subdivision using the Norwood name, "The Heart of Norwood", was platted on 50-acres west of Montgomery Road at Maple and Elm Avenues. It was later referred to as "Old Norwood" after newer subdivisions using the name Norwood were built.

=== Railroads and subdivisions ===
Despite the initial interest in Norwood generated by the arrival of the Marietta and Cincinnati Railroad, the new subdivisions were premature and failed to immediately take off. Only one home, located on the hill east of Norwood Mound, was constructed in the Norwood Heights subdivision. Norwood still remained largely farmland and orchards throughout the 1870s. Although the Marietta and Cincinnati railroad provided transportation to Cincinnati, it was via an inconvenient circuitous route which followed the Millcreek several miles out of the way to the west.

In 1875, several prominent local property owners in Norwood approached the Lebanon Narrow-gauge Railway Company (later known as the Cincinnati, Lebanon and Northern Railway) to discuss building a passenger railroad between Norwood and downtown Cincinnati. The property owners offered their land to the railroad for use as free right-of-way. The railroad agreed and began to lay tracks from the northeast to southwest through Norwood and Avondale in the late-1870s.

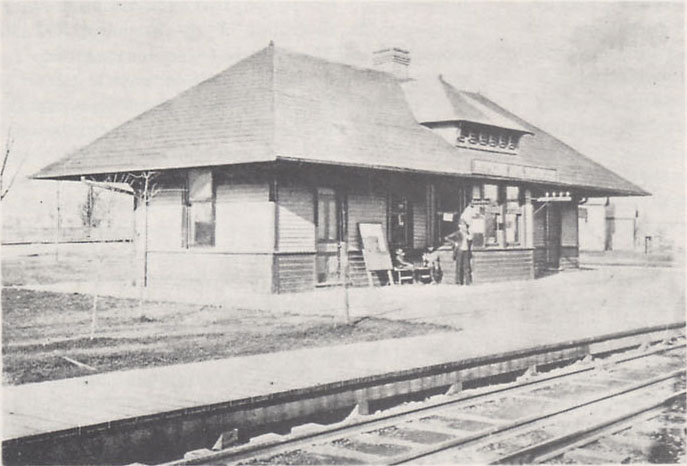
The Hopkins Avenue Station in the early-1890s. This building still stands at 4226 Montgomery Road.

Around the same time, construction was started on another railroad, the Cincinnati and Eastern Railway, which was built west to east along the present-day border of Norwood and Evanston. The tracks continued along Wasson Road in Hyde Park, connecting Norwood with Cincinnati's eastern suburbs and ultimately Portsmouth, Ohio. This line merged with the Cincinnati, Lebanon and Northern line southwest of Norwood at Idlewild, which was the name for the area near the present day campus of Xavier University.

In 1881, the northern section of the Cincinnati, Lebanon and Northern opened, connecting Norwood with Lebanon. In 1882, the southern section opened, providing service from Norwood directly to the central downtown station. Later in the year, the Cincinnati and Eastern Railway opened, providing passenger service from Norwood to Hyde Park and beyond.

The arrival of the passenger railroad proved to be the catalyst for rapid population growth in Norwood, as Cincinnatians could now work downtown and commute to their homes in the suburbs. Travel time between Norwood and downtown was less than 20 minutes.

Within a few years after the opening of the Cincinnati, Lebanon and Northern, five train stations were constructed in Norwood along the route. These were Idlewild, Ivanhoe, Hopkins, Norwood Park, and East Norwood.

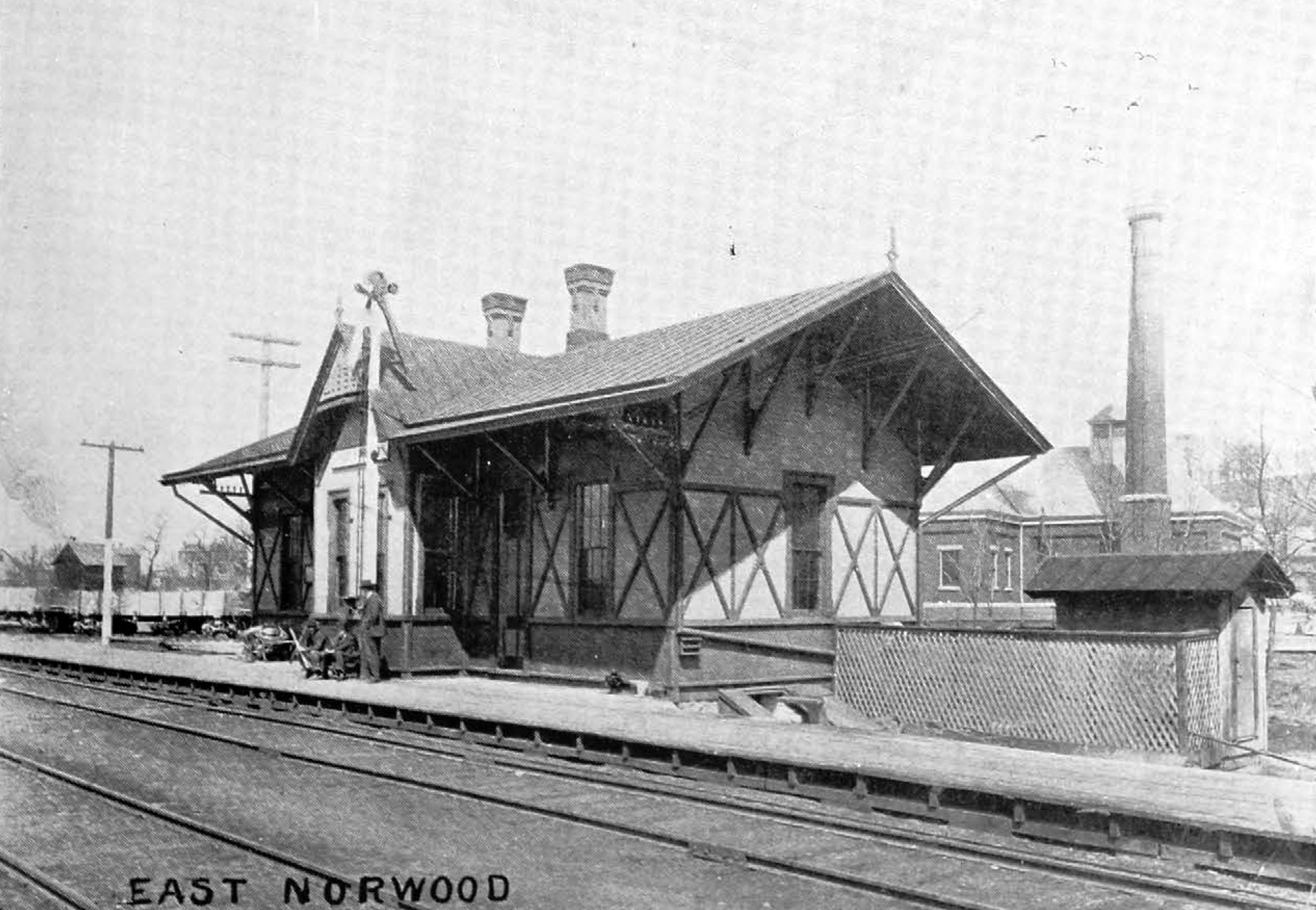
Commuters wait on a bench on the platform of the East Norwood train station near the southwest corner of Forest Avenue and Harris Avenue in 1894. The newly constructed Norwood Water Works Pump House is visible behind the station. The passenger station provided service for the Baltimore & Ohio Southwestern Railroad as well as the Cincinnati, Lebanon and Northern Railway, which was the commuter line between Norwood and downtown Cincinnati. The station likely ended passenger service in the 1920s and was destroyed by a fire in late-May 2000.

=== Village of Norwood ===
The 1880s in Norwood were marked by the development of several new subdivisions and municipal improvements throughout the village. The Cincinnati, Lebanon and Northern railroad influenced to the construction of the subdivisions.

The first Norwood Town Hall was constructed in 1882. The hall was constructed at the demand of local residents who wanted a village center for community functions. The Norwood Town Hall Association was instrumental in leading the effort to incorporate Norwood as a village in later years.

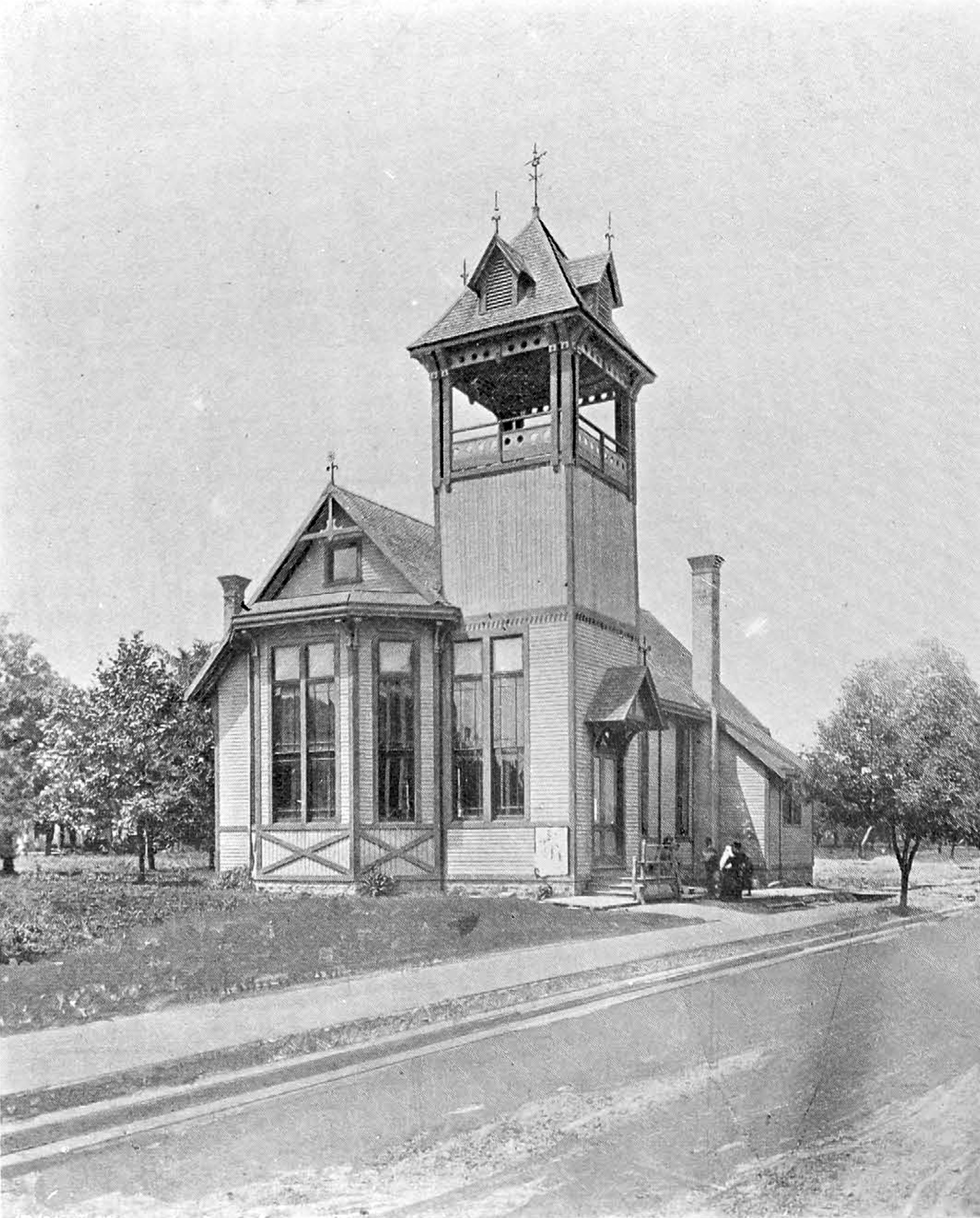
Norwood's first Town Hall was built in 1882 at the southwest corner of Montgomery Road and Elm Avenue before Norwood was incorporated as a village. It was later used as Norwood's first City Hall after Norwood became a city in 1902 and eventually was replaced by the current City Hall, the Norwood Municipal Building on the same site in 1916.

A small Central School schoolhouse was erected in 1887 to meet the education demands of the growing village. A one-room school house for Columbia Township had existed at this location possibly as early as 1828. Just one year after construction, the 1887 school house was expanded, as the number of students enrolled had already doubled.

Norwood's first fire brigade was organized in South Norwood in January 1888.

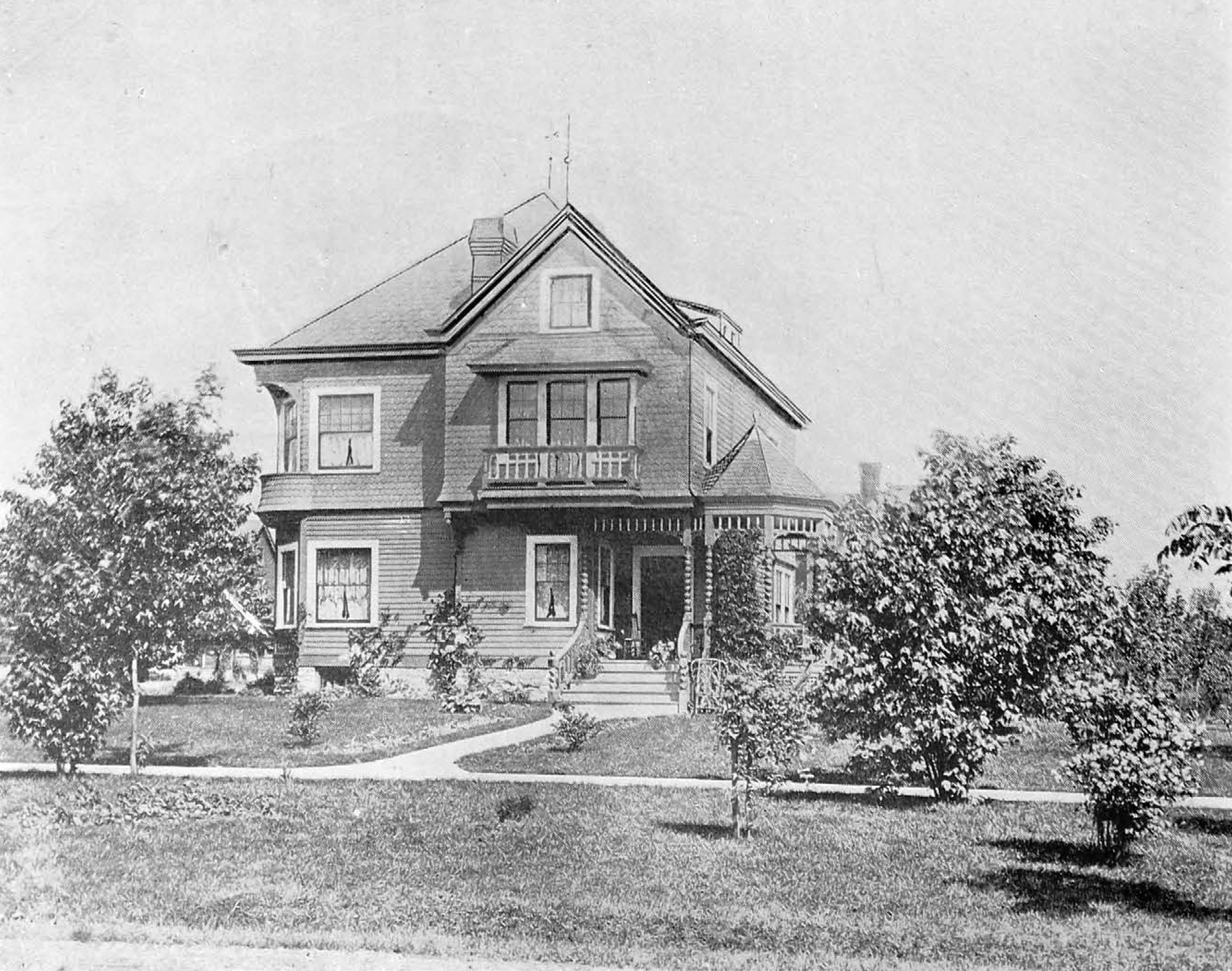
The Robert Leslie House at 4243 Floral Avenue was the first home built on Floral Avenue in South Norwood in 1888. It was also the site of the first fire fought by Norwood's first fire brigade, six days after their founding in January 1888.

As the village continued to grow, the leaders of the Town Hall Association knew the only way to sustain continued civic improvements was to incorporate as a village. One of the main incentives for incorporation was to provide public street lighting. The leaders started proceedings in early-1888 and on May 14, 1888, the Village of Norwood was formally incorporated by approval of the County Commissioners of Hamilton County. The signers of the petition were almost the entire male adult population of a total census of 1,000. Three months later, the first municipal elections were held and Dr. John C. Weyer was elected the village's first mayor.

Norwood continued to expand the boundaries of the village in 1889 by annexing land bordering the original subdivisions. The same year, work was started on a new subdivision called Elsmere. In 1891, Norwood Council annexed Elsmere as part of the village. These two annexations were the first of thirteen conducted by Norwood between 1889 and 1981.

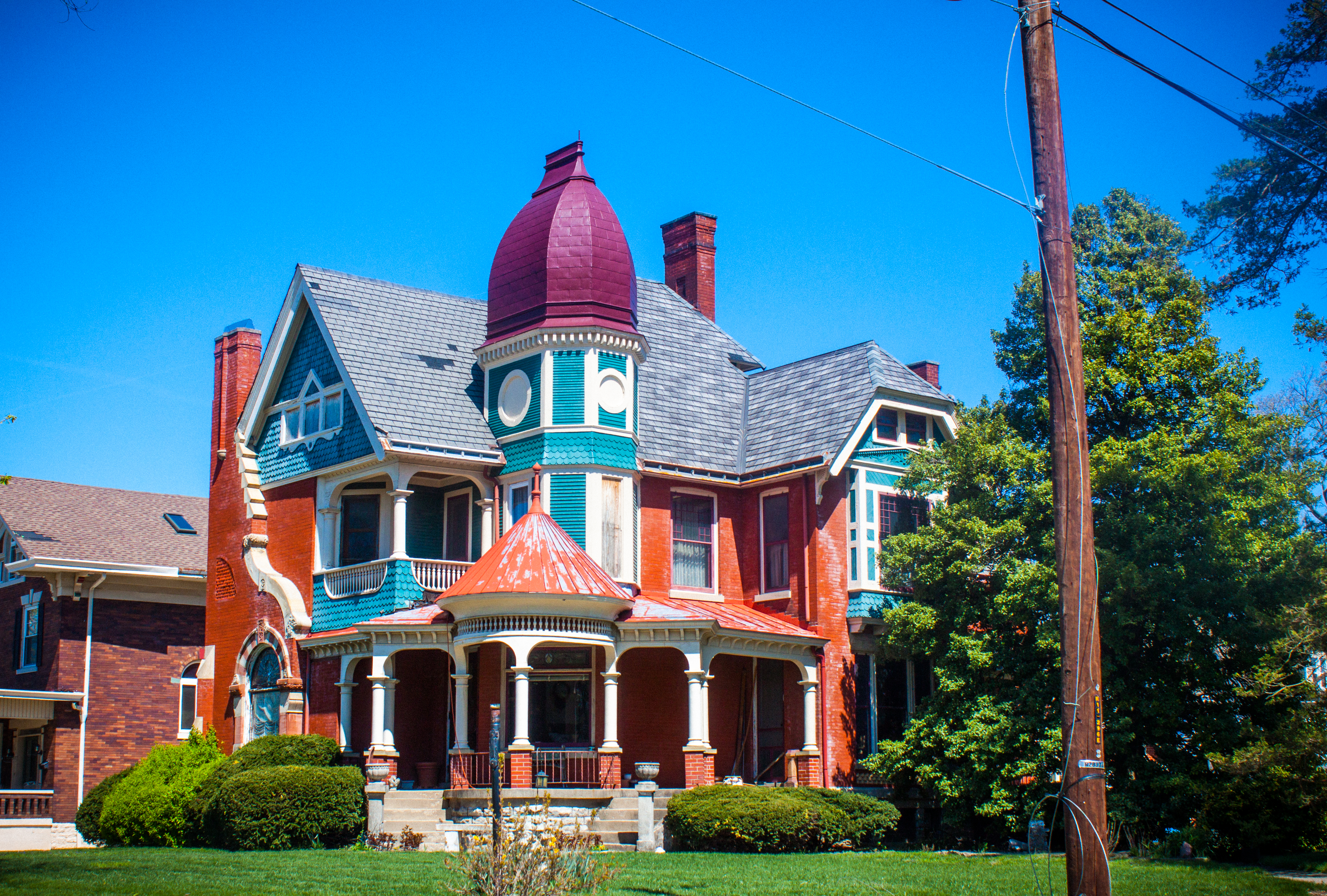
This 1890 Victorian house at 3904 Floral Avenue was designed by famed architect George Franklin Barber. Barber sold plans for his Victorian houses through a mail-order catalog and there are at least seven other versions of this house still in existence in the United States on the list of George Franklin Barber works. This particular home was one of the first built in Norwood's original Elsmere Subdivision and was used to advertise the subdivision in the 1894 book Norwood, Her Homes And Her People. The house was severely damaged by a fire on January 16, 2025, and partially collapsed.

=== Streetcars and Water Works ===
Around the time of Norwood's incorporation, local leaders began pushing for an electric streetcar route on Montgomery Road to connect Norwood with downtown. Until this time, Montgomery Road (known as "The Pike") was a privately owned turnpike, requiring users pay a toll to use the road. This private ownership became a sore spot for local residents who desired public streetcar transportation. With the help of the County Commissioners of Hamilton County and the State of Ohio, Norwood was able to purchase the road for public use and construction was started on an electric railway.

In mid-1891, the Norwood Electric Railway streetcar line was completed between Norwood and Walnut Hills, with the route extending to a turnaround at the Mount Adams Incline.

Increasing school enrollment resulted in the construction of two new school buildings in 1891. Williams School (later Williams Avenue Elementary) was opened in on Williams Avenue and Marion School (later North Norwood School) was opened on Marion Avenue. Both buildings were later replaced with newer structures.

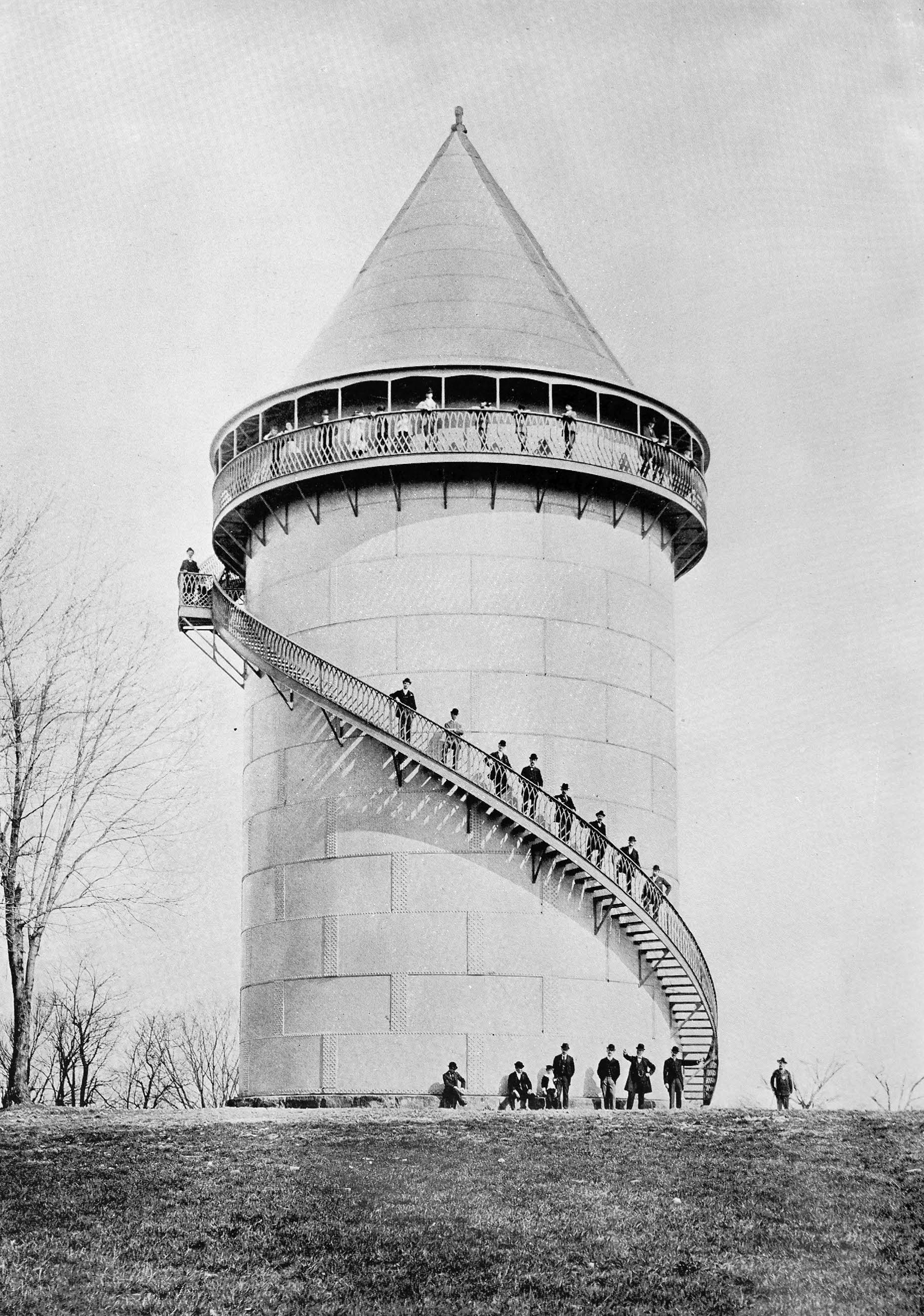
Norwood residents climb the observation deck of the Norwood Water Tower near Indian Mound in 1894.

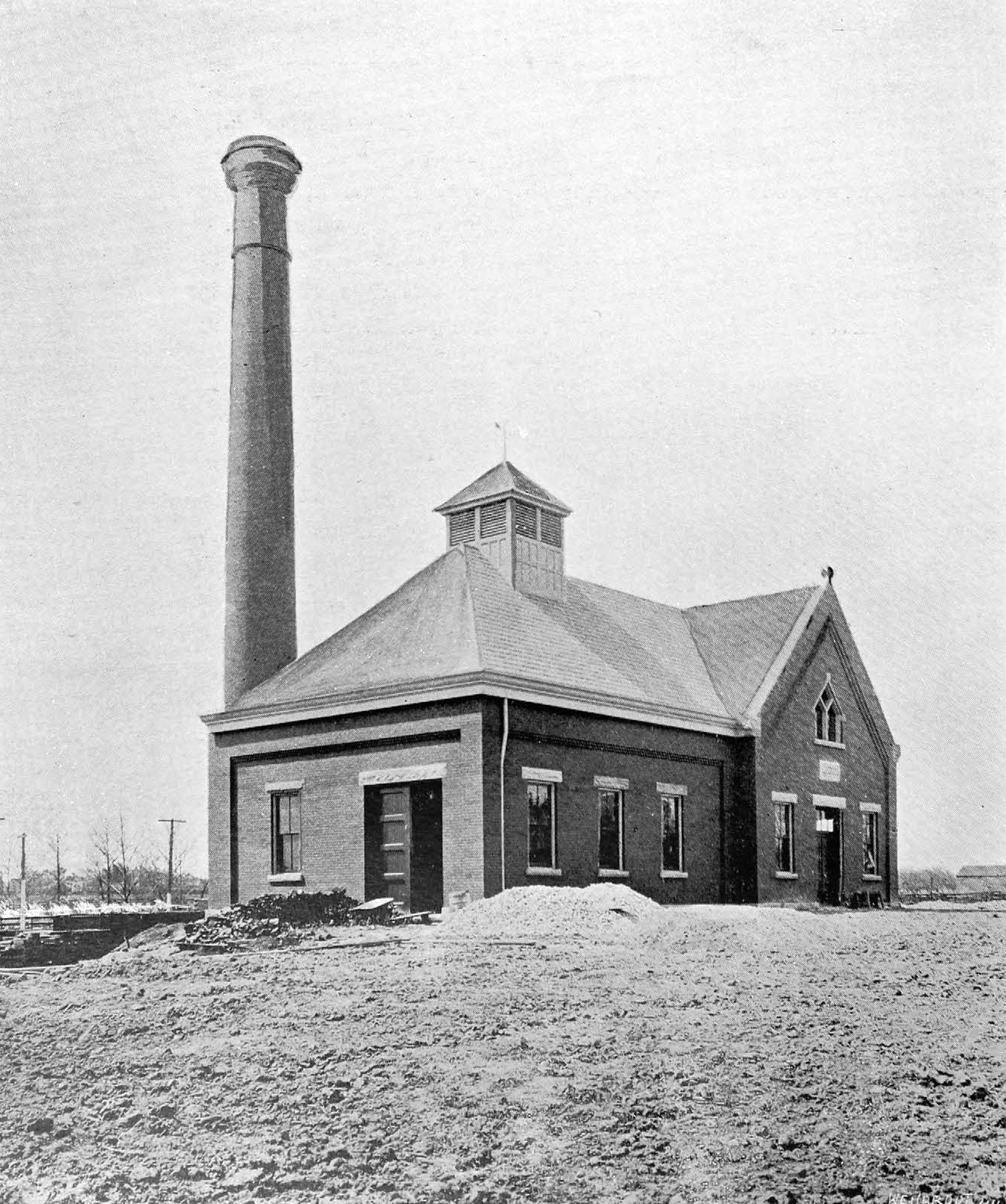
The Norwood Water Works Pump Station at the southwest corner of Harris Avenue and Forest Avenue, when it was constructed in 1894. The pump house pumped fresh well water from this location to the water tower on Indian Mound.

Clean drinking water was one of the most important issues facing Norwood in its early days. Residents had to rely on private wells, cisterns or streams for their water. In 1892, the citizens of Norwood voted for a public "water works" system to be built. In 1894, the Norwood Water Works was completed, which supplied Norwood with clean water for 65 years.

In March 1894, Norwood's first newspaper, the Norwood Enterprise, began publication. It would stay in print until 1989.

Norwood's first high school was constructed alongside a nearly identical new elementary school building, with both opening in 1897.

=== Early industry ===
In 1898, the Bullock Electric Manufacturing Company relocated to Norwood, becoming one of the village's first industrial plants, following McFarlan Lumber Company and the Cincinnati Brick Company. The plant was eventually acquired by German company, Siemens. In 1900, the Globe Wernicke Company constructed a new factory in Norwood for the manufacture of wooden bookcases. In 1901, the United States Playing Card Company moved to new facilities in Norwood.

=== City of Norwood ===
In 1902, the City of Cincinnati made the first of several attempts to annex Norwood. The citizens of Norwood rejected the merger by a margin of 55 votes. Later that year, Norwood citizens voted to incorporate the village as a city, since their population of 6,480 made them eligible for incorporation. This issue was decided by the same margin of 55 votes. Norwood's first city election took place in 1903. The newly elected officials repurposed the old Village Hall as the first City Hall of the City of Norwood.

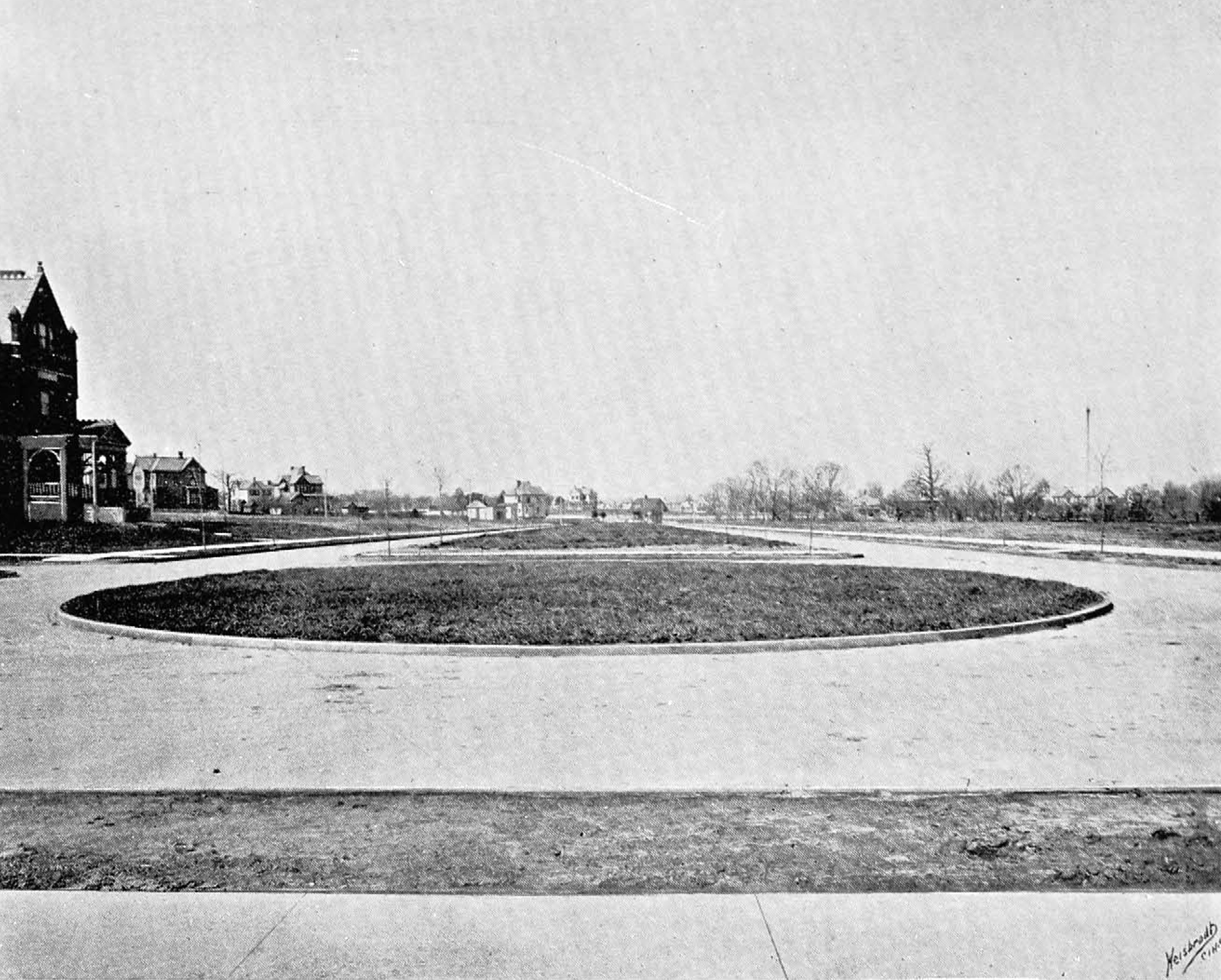
Park Avenue, as it originally appeared in 1894 when it was a new subdivision of stately Victorian homes. This photograph was taken at the intersection of Floral Avenue looking west. The house on the left still stands today at the corner of Park and Floral. Park Avenue runs along the former southern border of Norwood Park, which was a large park located in the area of today's Grande Central Station shopping center.

1905 was a significant year for public services in Norwood. On July 1, the city established both its fire and police departments. Later that year, the Andrew Carnegie Foundation provided funds to begin construction of Norwood's first public library, which opened in 1907. It was the second Carnegie Library to open in the Cincinnati area. The City of Norwood transferred the property to the Public Library of Cincinnati and Hamilton County and it became a branch of that organization.

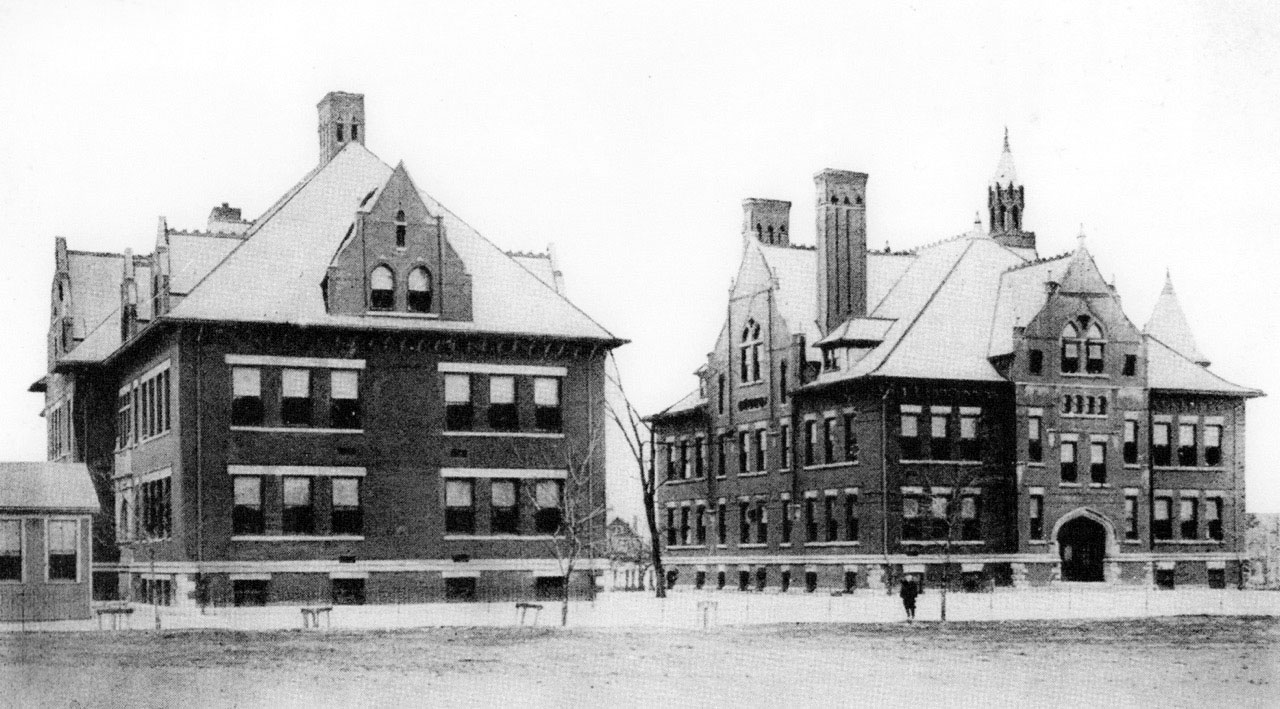
The first Norwood High School building (right) opened in 1897 beside the Allison Elementary School (left) on Allison Street. The Victorian Gothic Revival building is believed to have been designed by famed Cincinnati architect Samuel Hannaford. It was destroyed by fire in 1917, but the elementary school building still stands today.

In 1908, Greek immigrants, Thomas and Nicholas Aglamesis, opened an ice cream parlor on Montgomery Road in Norwood. Five years later, they added a second store in neighboring Oakley. The Norwood store eventually closed, but their Oakley location, known as Aglamesis Bro's, remains a popular Cincinnati institution to this day.

The same year, the United States Playing Card Company opened a new factory in Norwood. The factory would eventually grow to over 600,000 square feet of operations and become the largest manufacturer of playing cards in the world.

In 1909, Norwood officials began openly discussing the possibility of annexing neighboring Kennedy Heights. However, negotiations with Kennedy Heights officials eventually fell through and Kennedy Heights was later annexed by the City of Cincinnati.

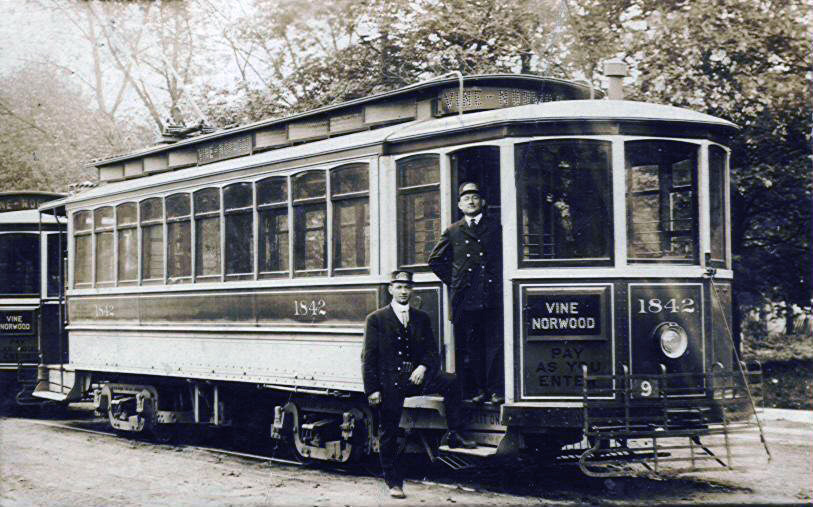
Two conductors stand beside a streetcar on the 9 Vine-Norwood line in 1910. The trolley transported passengers between Norwood and 6th & Walnut downtown.

In 1912, the Sears, Roebuck & Company purchased the Standard Mill Company and changed the name to the Norwood Sash & Door Company. This factory became the primary manufacturer of Sears’ prefabricated Catalog Homes. The factory was operated by Sears in Norwood until 1945.

=== New high school and city hall ===
Enrollment at Norwood High School continued to grow at a rapid pace and the student population eventually outgrew the first high school. In 1914, a new high school was constructed. The original high school on Allison Street was converted into an elementary school.

Norwood's current city hall, the Norwood Municipal Building, was designed by John Scudder Adkins, who was also the architect for the Norwood Public Library building. It opened in 1916, and was added to the National Register of Historic Places in 1980.

The old Allison High School building to burnt down in 1917. The building was later rebuilt. The same year, a new school was also constructed to replace the original 1892 Williams Avenue school.

More than 3,000 fans attended the season opener of the 1916 World Champion Norwood baseball team at Norwood Park. Norwood Park was also used during this era for other community entertainment events.

=== Industrial and infrastructure growth ===
According to a survey of historical records by the WPA, there were 47 factories in operation in Norwood by 1919.

In 1920, construction started on the Cincinnati Subway in downtown Cincinnati. The original plan was for a 16-mile loop to connect downtown with Norwood. Several subway tunnels were completed in Norwood. As subway construction continued into the late-1920s, the city experienced economic hardships and eventually abandoned the project in 1928, leaving the partially finished subway abandoned.

During the early-20th century, Norwood generated its own electricity at a municipal electric facility. In 1920, Norwood sold the facility and electrical distribution system to Cincinnati Gas & Electric Company, allowing CG&E to provide electrical services to the city.

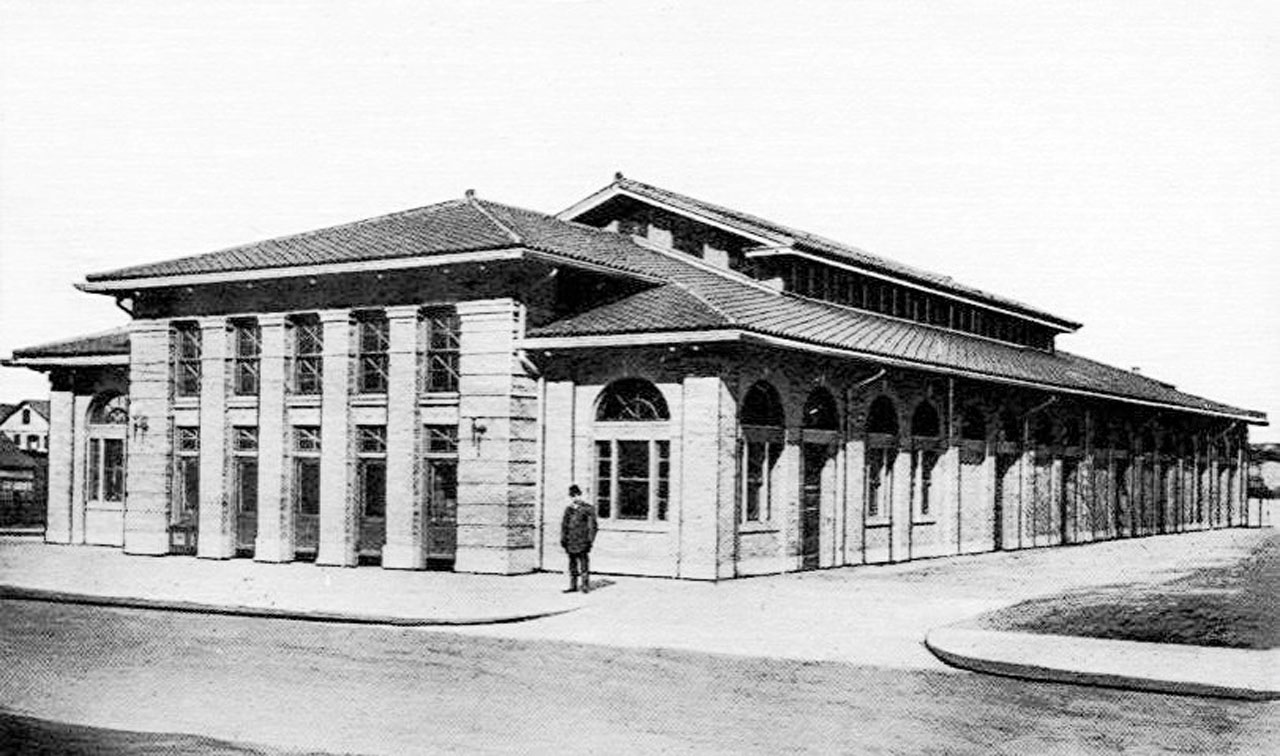
The Norwood Market House has stood at the corner of Mills Avenue and Walter Avenue next to Victory Park since about 1905. This photo was taken around 1910 when the building was still used as a farmers market.

In 1922, General Motors purchased 50 acres (200,000 m^{2}) of land to construct the 3,000,000 square feet (279,000 m^{2}) Norwood Assembly automobile plant. This property was previously a large community park known as Norwood Park. The Norwood Assembly Plant produced General Motors cars between 1923 and 1987. The GM plant became the dominant employer in Norwood, with nearly 9,000 workers during its peak in the 1970s. It also contributed approximately 35% of the City of Norwood's tax base.

To promote the popularity of the card game, bridge, the United States Playing Card Company established a radio station in 1922 at their factory with the call letters WSAI. Bridge experts played the game on the air and provided instruction to listeners. In 1926, the company built a bell tower atop the main factory building. The sounds of the bells were frequently broadcast on the station. The company operated WSAI in Norwood until it was sold to Crosley Broadcasting Corporation in 1928.

In an effort to improve Duck Creek Road, Norwood encased the Duck Creek waterway in a concrete aqueduct in 1923. The creek bed was filled in and all bridges spanning the waterway were removed. Most of Duck Creek road was later eliminated with the construction of Interstate 71 in the late-1960s.

Construction of the massive $1,000,000 Mt. Saint Mary's Seminary was completed in 1923. The seminary educated dozens of future priests, bishops, and archbishops for the Catholic Church until it closed in 1980. The seminary was purchased in 1993 and renovated over the course of years and reopened as Our Lady of the Holy Spirit Center and as a Marian Spiritual center in consonance with the Roman Catholic Church.

In 1930, the City of Norwood rezoned the city council from four to six wards, reflecting the increase in the city's population. The six wards were rezoned back to four after the population declined in the 2000s.

=== Decline of the railway ===
In 1933, Norwood's last new passenger train station was constructed. This station was opened to complement the new Cincinnati Union Terminal station downtown. The station was later closed and the renovated building is now used as a social hall.

The same year, the Cincinnati, Lebanon & Northern Railroad stopped providing passenger service. Rail travel in America was on the decline at this point due to the growing usage of the automobile.

Albers Supermarket, the first supermarket in Ohio and the first grocery store in the world to call itself a supermarket, was opened in 1933 by William H. Albers on Montgomery Road in Norwood at the site of today's Surrey Square shopping center. Albers, the former president of the Kroger Company, went on to revolutionize the grocery industry by embracing many innovations such as shopping carts, fluorescent lighting, and individual pricing on all items. The Albers chain was a success and was later acquired by Colonial Stores in 1955. The Norwood location was destroyed by a fire in 1968.

When the Ohio River flood of 1937 halted the operation of the Cincinnati Water Works, Norwood came to the aid of Cincinnati by offering drinking water from its artesian wells. Street flushing trucks were brought in from Cleveland to haul the water from Norwood to downtown.

In 1940, residents Carl H. Lindner Sr. and his children Carl Lindner Jr., Robert, Richard, and Dorothy opened the first United Dairy Farmers store in Norwood. Until this point, most people paid a premium to have milk delivered directly to their homes. United Dairy Farmers cut out the delivery middleman and sold milk at their store for nearly half the price of delivered milk. The UDF chain of stores eventually grew and helped make Carl Lindner Jr. one of the world's richest people.

In 1948, Norwood opened a municipal parking lot at the site of the future Surrey Square shopping center. This was one of the first significant steps in the transformation of Norwood's downtown business district, known as "The Pike," from pedestrian-friendly storefronts to the Surrey Square automobile-centric strip mall.

The following year, streetcar lines in Norwood were eliminated and replaced by trolley buses, using the same overhead double electric lines.

A new Williams Avenue elementary school and administration building were constructed in 1952 next to the existing 1917 school.

Around 1959, the water table of Norwood's artesian wells dropped to a level that became too expensive to maintain and Norwood began buying water from Cincinnati.

Ohio State Route 562, also known as the Norwood Lateral Expressway, was first completed between Interstate 75 and Reading Road in 1962. It was nicknamed the Norwood Lateral due to its close approach to Norwood, which at the time was Hamilton County's 2nd largest municipality. For nearly two decades, the "Lateral" terminated at Reading Road inside Cincinnati city limits. In 1969, work began on the extension of the "Lateral" into Norwood proper and connection to the proposed Interstate 71. The route of I-71 would pass through Norwood's east side. To accommodate the extension, nearly 200 homes in the old East Norwood neighborhood were razed, resulting in a loss of population and property tax revenue. Norwood was also required to share 5% of the cost of the expressway project. The full Norwood Lateral extension was completed in 1977.

At about the same time as the Norwood Lateral completion, the Globe-Wernicke Company moved operations out of Norwood to Tennessee. The factory was closed and demolished two years later.

The overhead wires used to power the trolley buses and the street cars were removed from Norwood streets in 1965. The trolley buses, which had replaced street cars in 1949, were replaced by gasoline and diesel powered buses.

=== Surrey Square and decline of "The Pike" ===
Around 1967, Norwood's first strip mall, Norwood Plaza, opened. Business owners were concerned the strip mall would impact Norwood's central business district.

After the Albers Supermarket was destroyed by fire in 1968, Norwood purchased the property and demolished the building as part of an urban renewal plan. This plan was centered around the construction of a new shopping center, which eventually became Surrey Square. In 1972, other businesses were demolished as an additional phase of the urban renewal plan.

To accommodate growing enrollment, Norwood constructed a new high school in 1972, adjacent to the old 1914 high school. The old high school became the middle school. The new high school included a planetarium (now known as Drake Planetarium and Science Center).

In 1975, Surrey Square Shopping Center opened in the heart of the original shopping district. Ironically, the inside of Surrey Square Mall was designed to look like a traditional small town main street, complete with fake storefronts reminiscent of the ones which were destroyed by the construction of the mall.

The Norwood Historical Society was chartered on May 2, 1978.

In 1985, Norwood natives Carl Lindner Jr. and his brother Robert Lindner donated $150,000 to the City of Norwood so it could purchase the 14-acre McCullough Estate. The Ohio Department of Natural Resources also awarded a matching grant so the estate could be converted into a nature preserve and park. The estate was part of the original 100-acre McCullough Seed Company property the McCullough Family settled in 1850 and operated on this land until 1960. Although the park is located in Cincinnati, it is owned and operated as a City of Norwood park. Norwood now totaled 30-acres of recreation land among 9 city parks.

=== GM closure ===
On November 6, 1986, General Motors announced that it would close the Norwood Assembly automobile plant as part of a $10 billion plan to reorganize the company. Many Norwood employees expected Norwood's sister plant, Van Nuys Assembly, to close instead. However, GM stated that the aging Norwood plant would be difficult to modernize and the campus was "landlocked" with no room for expansion. The company also cited high absenteeism, low productivity and low quality control as additional factors in its decision.

The closure of the plant in 1987 nearly dealt a death blow to Norwood's economy. GM was by far the largest employer in Norwood and its income and property taxes accounted for one-third of the city's operating budget and one-fifth of the money for its schools. Approximately 1,000 of the factory's 4,300 workers were Norwood residents.

As a result of the closure, Norwood City Council dramatically slashed the city's budget. Norwood's parks, roads, buildings, water lines began to deteriorate. The City of Cincinnati even considered annexing Norwood to help with financial problems, but the plan was rebuffed by Cincinnati Mayor Charles Luken, who said he had no intention of "taking advantage of Norwood's misfortune." Norwood's mayor, Joseph E. Sanker, publicly speculated that Cincinnati was not interested in Norwood without the GM plant.

Norwood's economic issues continued to worsen in 1988 when another long-time manufacturing business, R. K. LeBlond Machine Tool Company, closed its Norwood factory.

In 1989, Norwood's last remaining newspaper, The Norwood Enterprise, ceased publication. Other Norwood community newspapers have occasionally started in the years since the Enterprise ceased publication, but none has lasted more than a few years.

=== Economic revitalization ===
Despite the dire financial situation in Norwood, it did not take long for the city to realize the closing of General Motors was an opportunity to transition its image from a blue-collar industrial city to a business and retail destination. In 1989, city signed a deal with the Belvedere Corporation to develop both the former GM site. The same year, the city also made plans to build a retail and restaurant complex called Rookwood Pavilion on the site of the old LeBlond plant. In 1990, the first of these new projects, a shopping plaza called Grand Central Station, opened at the site of the old GM plant.

In July 1990, a cleaning solvent leak at the BASF chemical plant on the border of Norwood and Evanston resulted in an explosion, killing two and injuring 90 people. The blast heavily damaged Norwood businesses and affected Norwood homes as far as a mile away.

In 1993, the Belvedere Corporation opened a second new development called Central Parke. The project consisted of mixed-use office buildings.

In 1993, developers opened the Rookwood Pavilion shopping center on the grounds of the old Lablond factory site. Rookwood Pavilion was successful and prompted developers to begin purchasing additional land in the area for future developments. In 2000, Rookwood Commons shopping center opened immediately behind Rookwood Pavilion.

Despite sporadic efforts to save what was remaining of "The Pike," the city allowed the demolition of several historic storefronts and buildings in 2002.

In 2004, Norwood was forced by the State of Ohio to reduce the number of city council wards from 6 to 4, to reflect a decline in population.

Norwood also lost a significant amount of public transportation in 2004 when the Southwest Ohio Regional Transit Authority eliminated all but two bus routes in the city. Some of the eliminated routes had serviced the city by either bus or streetcar for over 100 years.

In fall of 2004, another new development called Cornerstone At Norwood was constructed.

=== Eminent domain ===
After the success of the two Rookwood shopping centers, the developer, Jeffrey Anderson, approached the City of Norwood regarding a third project called Rookwood Exchange that he wanted to build across the street. He proposed bulldozing a residential neighborhood and replacing them with a new mixed-use residential, office, and retail development.

The city approved the plan and Anderson began purchasing the neighborhood properties in 2005 through voluntary sales. All of the property owners eventually agreed to sell except for three which refused to leave. In an effort to clear the remaining properties, Anderson paid for a study declaring the neighborhood a "deteriorating area" so the City of Norwood could use eminent domain to force the remaining property owners to sell.

The three property owners fought Norwood's use of eminent domain, and the dispute eventually made national headlines in 2006 when it was brought before the Ohio Supreme Court in Norwood, Ohio v. Horney. The court ruled unanimously for the property owners, forcing the city and developers to return ownership of the three properties. After the verdict, the property owners held out for several more years before eventually selling. The second to last property was sold to the developer in 2007 for $650,000.

In September 2008, the final property owner agreed to sell his rental home to the developer for 1.25 million.

In 2014, after many years of legal battles and construction delays, Rookwood Exchange opened.

=== Continued development ===
In 2006, developers broke ground on Linden Pointe on the Lateral, a large office park complex on the old former American Laundry Machine Company and Globe Wernicke properties. Because the property was Brownfield land, it had to be decontaminated prior to construction.

After more than 100 years in Norwood, the US Playing Card Company closed their Norwood factory and moved operations to Boone County, Kentucky in 2008.

Xavier University acquired the old Norwood Plaza shopping center and demolished many of the structures to make way for campus expansion. In a joint effort with Norwood and Cincinnati, Xavier University opened University Station.

== Geography ==
Norwood is located at 39°9′36″N 84°27′18″W (39.160060, −84.455074).

According to the United States Census Bureau, the city has a total area of 3.15 square miles (8.16 km^{2}), all land.

== Demographics ==
Historical population
Census	Pop.	Note	%±
1900	6,480		—
1910	16,185		149.8%
1920	24,966		54.3%
1930	33,411		33.8%
1940	34,010		1.8%
1950	35,001		2.9%
1960	34,580		−1.2%
1970	30,420		−12.0%
1980	26,126		−14.1%
1990	23,674		−9.4%
2000	21,675		−8.4%
2010	19,207		−11.4%
2020	19,043		−0.9%

=== 2020 census ===
As of the 2020 census, Norwood had a population of 19,043, yielding a population density of 6,058.86 people per square mile (2,339.33/km^{2}).

The median age was 32.4 years; 18.5% of residents were under the age of 18 and 11.2% of residents were 65 years of age or older. For every 100 females there were 99.9 males, and for every 100 females age 18 and over there were 98.8 males age 18 and over.

100.0% of residents lived in urban areas, while 0.0% lived in rural areas.

There were 8,616 households in Norwood, of which 21.5% had children under the age of 18 living in them. Of all households, 27.7% were married-couple households, 28.5% were households with a male householder and no spouse or partner present, and 34.0% were households with a female householder and no spouse or partner present. About 40.3% of all households were made up of individuals and 8.8% had someone living alone who was 65 years of age or older.

There were 9,644 housing units, of which 10.7% were vacant. The homeowner vacancy rate was 3.0% and the rental vacancy rate was 7.9%.

Racial composition as of the 2020 census
Race	Number	Percent
White	14,751	77.5%
Black or African American	2,239	11.8%
American Indian and Alaska Native	51	0.3%
Asian	234	1.2%
Native Hawaiian and Other Pacific Islander	10	0.1%
Some other race	599	3.1%
Two or more races	1,159	6.1%
Hispanic or Latino (of any race)	1,110	5.8%

According to the U.S. Census American Community Survey, for the period 2016-2020 the estimated median annual income for a household in the city was $48,703, and the median income for a family was $71,066. About 21.6% of the population were living below the poverty line, including 28.5% of those under age 18 and 13.5% of those age 65 or over. About 67.5% of the population were employed, and 31.3% had a bachelor's degree or higher.

=== 2010 census ===
As of the census of 2010, there were 19,207 people, 8,320 households, and 4,190 families residing in the city. The population density was 6,097.5 inhabitants per square mile (2,354.3/km^{2}). There were 9,515 housing units at an average density of 3,020.6 per square mile (1,166.3/km^{2}). The racial makeup of the city was 86.6% White, 7.6% African American, 0.4% Native American, 0.8% Asian, 0.1% Pacific Islander, 2.0% from other races, and 2.5% from two or more races. Hispanic or Latino of any race were 5.1% of the population.

There were 8,320 households, of which 25.3% had children under the age of 18 living with them, 30.1% were married couples living together, 14.5% had a female householder with no husband present, 5.8% had a male householder with no wife present, and 49.6% were non-families. 37.9% of all households were made up of individuals, and 9% had someone living alone who was 65 years of age or older. The average household size was 2.28 and the average family size was 3.03.

The median age in the city was 33.4 years. 20.2% of residents were under the age of 18; 14.3% were between the ages of 18 and 24; 30.3% were from 25 to 44; 24.2% were from 45 to 64; and 11.1% were 65 years of age or older. The gender makeup of the city was 49.9% male and 50.1% female.

As of the 2010 United States census, The median value of owner-occupied housing units between 2005 and 2009 was $120,900. The home ownership rate from 2005 to 2009 was 57.8%. The median household income 2005–2009 was $39,224. The per capita money income in past 12 months (2009 dollars) 2005–2009 was $21,367. People of all ages in poverty from 2005 to 2009 was 20.6%.

=== 2000 census ===
During the 2000 United States census there were 21,675 people, 9,270 households, and 5,154 families residing in the Norwood. The population density was 6,956.5 inhabitants per square mile (2,685.9/km^{2}). There were 10,044 housing units at an average density of 3,223.6 per square mile (1,244.6/km^{2}). The racial makeup of the city was 94.25% White, 2.35% African American, 0.36% Native American, 0.77% Asian, 0.02% Pacific Islander, 0.88% from other races, and 1.37% from two or more races. Hispanic or Latino of any race were 1.85% of the population. There were 9,270 households, out of which 26.7% had children under the age of 18 living with them, 36.8% were married couples living together, 13.7% had a female householder with no husband present, and 44.4% were non-families. 36.3% of all households were made up of individuals, and 11.1% had someone living alone who was 65 years of age or older. The average household size was 2.31 and the average family size was 3.04. In the city the age distribution of the population shows 23.4% under the age of 18, 11.9% from 18 to 24, 32.4% from 25 to 44, 19.7% from 45 to 64, and 12.6% who were 65 years of age or older. The median age was 34 years. For every 100 females, there were 94.9 males. For every 100 females age 18 and over, there were 90.9 males. The median income for a household in the city was $32,223, and the median income for a family was $39,951. Males had a median income of $31,530 versus $25,852 for females. The per capita income for the city was $18,108. About 8.6% of families and 12.9% of the population were below the poverty line, including 15.3% of those under age 18 and 7.5% of those age 65 or over.

== Government ==
The elected members of Norwood City government are: the mayor, president of council, auditor, treasurer, law director, four ward-specific city council members and three at-large city council members. The City of Norwood has its own police, fire, recreation, building, and public works departments, which are managed by the Safety-Service Director.

== Economy ==
Norwood has a strong history of industry and manufacturing dating back to the historic Norwood Brick plant of the late 19th century, which provided clay brick for the construction of many of Cincinnati's historic buildings. As the city is ideally situated between several major railways, state roads and interstate highways, it has traditionally been an attractive location for businesses and corporations in the area. Norwood was once described as the "Chicago of Hamilton County", for in 1909 it had 49 manufacturing enterprises.

Prominent Norwood industrial and manufacturing companies included: General Motors Norwood Assembly, United Dairy Farmers, Allis-Chalmers, Siemens, Bullock Electric Manufacturing Company, United States Playing Card Company, Globe Wernicke, American Laundry Machine Company, Norwood Sash & Door Company (Sears Catalog Homes), United States Printing & Lithographing Company, U.S. Shoe Corp, Mead Container Corporation, J.H. Day Corporation, and Zumbiel Packaging.

Between 1923 and 1987, the General Motors automobile assembly plant was by far the city's largest employer in terms of production, payroll and employees. When GM closed the factory in 1987, it nearly dealt a death blow to Norwood's economy. This event became the catalyst for Norwood's transition from an industrial economy to a diversified office and retail economy. In the years following the GM closure, Norwood worked with developers to build many mixed-use office parks and retail centers in the city, including: Grande Central Station (1990), Central Parke (1993), Rookwood Pavilion (1995), Rookwood Commons (2000), Cornerstone at Norwood (2004), Linden Pointe on the Lateral (2007), Surrey Square (2008), Rookwood Exchange (2014), Norwood State Station (2014).

== Education ==
The Norwood City School District consists of Norwood High School, Norwood Middle School, Sharpsburg Elementary, Norwood View Elementary, Williams Avenue Elementary, and Norwood Preschool. The current high school opened as a state-of-the-art facility in 1972, with a planetarium, greenhouse, swimming pool, and television studio. Drake Planetarium, named after astronomer and astrophysicist Frank Drake, is associated with NASA. Norwood High School's mascot is the Indian. Norwood Middle School is located next to the high school in the previous high school building, which opened in 1914. In 1988, the Norwood Middle School field house and offices were used to film prison scenes in the 1989 Tom Selleck movie An Innocent Man. Norwood is also home to Immaculate Conception Academy parochial grade school and high school, located in the former Gressle School on Floral Avenue.

== Sports and recreation ==
=== Norwood Recreation Commission ===
The McCullough House at Lindner Park.

The Norwood Recreation Department is managed by the Recreation Director, who is overseen by the Safety-Service Director.

The Norwood Recreation Department operates and supervises several playgrounds and two swimming pools - one indoor and one outdoor. Permits for ball diamonds, tennis courts and picnic areas are also issued through the Recreation office. The Recreation Department conducts leagues for softball teams for men and women in addition to assisting and cooperating with the Norwood Knothole Association and Norwood Soccer Association in providing facilities for all their teams.

Swimming pools:

- Burwood Pool (closed)
- Fenwick Pool (closed)
- Millcrest Pool (closed)
- Northwoods Pool (closed)
- Norwood Recreation Indoor Pool
- Norwood Middle School Pool (closed)
- Victory Pool (closed)
- Waterworks J.B. Wirth Pool

Parks:

- Burwood Park
- Dorl Park
- Fenwick Park
- Hunter Park
- Lindner Park Nature Preserve
- Marsh Park
- Millcrest Park
- Lower Millcrest Park
- Northwoods Park
- Tower Park
- Victory Park
- Waterworks Park

== Nicknames ==
Norwood is known as the "Gem of the Highlands".

== Notable people ==
=== Arts and entertainment ===
- George Chakiris, actor and dancer
- Paul Delph, keyboardist for band Zoo Drive
- Henry Farny, French-born painter and illustrator
- Tim Lucas, novelist and film critic
- Mr. Dibbs, hip hop producer
- John Augustus Knapp, American artist
- Jack Mullaney, actor
- Over The Rhine, Ohio folk music band
- Jody Payne, musician
- Louis Rebisso, Italian sculptor
- Janice Rule, actress
- Vera-Ellen, actress and dancer
- John Ellsworth Weis, painter

=== Business ===
- Samuel Frisch, opened Frisch's Stag Lunch in Norwood in 1910, first location of Frisch's Big Boy restaurant chain
- Carl Lindner Jr., banker and financier

=== Science and medicine ===
- Brian Werner, tiger conservationist
- John Uri Lloyd, pharmacist, scientist, and twice president of American Pharmaceutical Association
- Frank Bradway Rogers, medical doctor and librarian

=== Law and politics ===
- Joseph B. Foraker, 37th governor of Ohio and United States senator
- Joseph Ralston, former Vice Chairman of the Joint Chiefs of Staff and Supreme Allied Commander for NATO

=== Sports ===
- Bob Barton, baseball player
- Carl Bouldin, baseball pitcher
- Marc Edwards, football player
- Roy Golden, baseball player
- Ed Jucker, basketball coach
- Dorothy Kamenshek, baseball player
- Ed "Specs" Klieman, baseball player
- Maxwell Holt, volleyball player
- Brad Loesing, basketball player
- George Miller, baseball player
- Larry Pape, baseball player
- Heinie Peitz, baseball player
- Arthur Pickens, jockey
- Brian Pillman, football player
- Thomas Scott, archer
- Dominique Steele, mixed martial artist
- Bob Wellman, baseball player and manager

=== Religion ===
- Ralph W. Beiting, founder of the Christian Appalachian Project
- Joseph R. Binzer, auxiliary bishop
- Robert Daniel Conlon, bishop
- Paul Vincent Donovan, bishop
- James Henry Garland, bishop
- Henry Joseph Grimmelsmann, bishop
- Clarence George Issenmann, bishop
- Paul Francis Leibold, archbishop
- Edward A. McCarthy, archbishop
- Carl K. Moeddel, bishop
- Henry K. Moeller, archbishop
- Anthony John King Mussio, bishop
- Leo Aloysius Pursley, bishop
- George John Rehring, bishop
- Michael William Warfel, bishop

=== Crime ===
- Robert Bales, United States Army soldier and perpetrator of the 2012 Kandahar massacre
- Robert Anthony Buell, convicted of the murder of 11-year-old Krista Harrison
