= Ralph W. Beiting =

American priest (1924–2012)

Monsignor Ralph W. Beiting (January 1, 1924 - August 9, 2012) was a Roman Catholic priest and the founder of the Christian Appalachian Project in the US.

== Career ==
Beiting was born in 1924 in Northern Kentucky. He was the oldest of eleven children and grew up during the Great Depression.

In 1946 he joined a seminary with the view to becoming a priest. During this time, he accompanied several priests on preaching trips to the mountains of eastern Kentucky. The poverty he observed in Appalachia planted the seeds of a vision that eventually became the Christian Appalachian Project.

After ordination in 1949, Beiting was assigned to work as an assistant pastor in a northern Kentucky parish and as a math teacher at Newport Catholic High School.

One year after his assignment, he met with Bishop William Theodore Mulloy where Mulloy told him he had been selected to pastor a large portion of east central Kentucky. He was elated despite the fact that there were no churches or rectories in the area. "On October 7, 1950," he said, "I found myself in Appalachia, pastor of a non-existent church in a parish the size of the state of Rhode Island. I thought to myself, 'This has got to be some mistake.' If it was, it was the happiest mistake of my life."

As a seminarian Beiting learned that all people - not just Catholic people - were part of his ministry and in Appalachia he quickly found that for many of his people the greatest need was not spiritual, but physical. Discovering far more need than he could alleviate by himself, he called on his family and friends in northern Kentucky for help. In the early years, he frequently made trips to pick up food, clothing and household goods from his friends and family.

He served as dean of the Mountain Catholic Clergy from 1960 through 1978.

== Founding CAP ==
In 1957, he and his associate pastor, Father Herman Kamlage, pooled their small stipends and bought land on Herrington Lake in Garrard County, Kentucky, to start a summer camp for boys. Named Cliffview Lodge, it was integrated (during the days when segregation was expected), and incorporated independently from the Catholic Diocese of Covington. Cliffview offered recreation and fellowship in a Christian atmosphere to boys from poor families in the counties where Beiting ministered. The summer camp ministry was a success, and in 1964 Beiting gave a name to his growing ministry and declared it "would be a group that would roll up our sleeves and get the job done." The Christian Appalachian Project was started at this time and incorporated shortly thereafter.

Beiting served as CAP's president until 1986, then as a board member until September 1999 when he was honored as lifetime chairman emeritus of the board.

== Later career ==
In 1972, Beiting decided to restore Camp Nelson, Kentucky. He spent five years revitalising the area. However, following a fire and severe storms, the Camp was abandoned as financially unsustainable.

Beiting served as the pastor of parishes in Garrard, Rockcastle, Jackson and southern Madison counties in Kentucky until 1981. During those years he constructed churches and served people in each of those counties, then was transferred to parishes in the Big Sandy region, where he built churches in Water Gap, Louisa and Hode. During his nearly 50 years in eastern Kentucky, Beiting has founded and/or constructed twenty churches.

He was selected by the governor to represent Kentucky as a delegate for the 1997 Presidential Summit in Philadelphia.

In addition, he has authored twelve books on Appalachia and its people.

== Honors ==
Beiting has been recognized for his work at CAP and in eastern Kentucky by both religious and secular groups.

In 1970, he was named a monsignor by Pope Paul VI.

Kentucky Governor Louie Nunn recognized Beiting as an outstanding Kentuckian in 1969.

He was honored in 1996 by Governor Paul Patton for his work in economic development.

His work as a volunteer has been recognized by the National Catholic Development Conference (The Good Samaritan Award in 1973), the National Center of Voluntary Action (The National Volunteer Award in 1971) and the Caring Institute (The Caring Award in 1990).

Beiting was featured in the PBS series The Visionaries in 1996.

He received the Meeker Award from Ottawa University in Ottawa, Kansas, in 1997.

He received the Lincoln Award from Northern Kentucky University in 1998, which said, "This award represents a commitment to service, fidelity to noble causes and sense of turning challenges into opportunities."

He was also the recipient of the Catholic University of America Theological Colleges 1999 Alumnus Lifetime Service Award.

In the year 2000, Beiting celebrated fifty years of service to Appalachia.

Beiting is a graduate of St. Gregory Minor Seminary in Mount Washington, Ohio, St. Mary's Seminary in Norwood, Ohio, and the Catholic University of America in Washington, D.C.

== See also ==
- Christian Appalachian Project
