= Marc Edwards (American football) =

American football player (born 1974)

No. 44, 49
- Position: Fullback

Personal information
- Born: November 17, 1974 (age 51); Cincinnati, Ohio, U.S.
- Listed height: 6 ft 0 in (1.83 m)
- Listed weight: 249 lb (113 kg)

Career information
- High school: Norwood (Norwood, Ohio)
- College: Notre Dame
- NFL draft: 1997: 2nd round, 55th overall pick

Career history
- San Francisco 49ers (1997–1998); Cleveland Browns (1999–2000); New England Patriots (2001–2002); Jacksonville Jaguars (2003–2004); Chicago Bears (2005)

Awards and highlights
- Super Bowl champion (XXXVI)

Career NFL statistics
- Rushing yards: 405
- Rushing average: 3.3
- Receptions: 167
- Receiving yards: 1,301
- Total touchdowns: 13
- Stats at Pro Football Reference

Marc Alexander Edwards (born November 17, 1974) is an American former professional football player who was a fullback in the National Football League (NFL) for nine years from 1997 to 2005.

Edwards attended Norwood High School in Norwood, Ohio, and started at middle linebacker on the school's football team alongside Robert Bales, whom he replaced as the team's starting middle linebacker as a freshman star.

Edwards was named Ohio's Mr. Football in 1992 as the state's top player. He played college football for the Notre Dame Fighting Irish. Following his team's upset win over the No. 5-ranked USC Trojans on October 21, 1995, Edwards became the second Fighting Irish player ever to be carried off the field by his teammates; the first was Daniel E. "Rudy" Ruettiger in 1975. Edwards's senior year he was picked as a team captain at Notre Dame.

Edwards was selected by the San Francisco 49ers in the second round of the 1997 NFL draft with the 55th overall pick. After two years in San Francisco, Edwards played the following two years for the Cleveland Browns from 1999 to 2000. He has also played for the New England Patriots from 2001 to 2002, winning Super Bowl XXXVI, and the Jacksonville Jaguars from 2003 to 2004. Edwards's high school retired his No. 44 Jersey on September 11, 2009. In October 2010, a book by Aaron M. Smith about Edwards's life, Odyssey: From Blue Collar, Ohio To Super Bowl Champion, was published.
