= Norwood High School (Ohio) =

Coeducational high school in Ohio, US

Location
- 2020 Sherman Avenue; Norwood, Ohio 45212; United States
- 39°9′41″N 84°27′34″W

Information
- Type: Public, Coeducational high school
- Motto: We Are Norwood
- School district: Norwood City Schools
- Superintendent: Joe Westendorf
- Principal: Mark Gabbard
- Teaching staff: 31.28 (on an FTE basis)
- Grades: 9-12
- Student to teacher ratio: 13.91
- Colors: Navy and scarlet
- Athletics conference: Miami Valley Conference
- Nickname: NHS
- Team name: The Indians/Lady Indians
- Accreditation: North Central Association of Colleges and Schools
- Website: www.norwoodschools.org

Norwood High School is a high school in Norwood, Ohio which has been rated Excellent by the Ohio Department of Education. It is the only high school in the Norwood City School District. The Drake Planetarium, located in the high school, is named after astronomer and astrophysicist Frank Drake and is linked to NASA. Norwood High School owns the 1936 state title for baseball. The interior of old Norwood High School, now Norwood Junior High School, was used to film several scenes appearing in the 1989 film An Innocent Man, starring Tom Selleck.

== Ohio High School Athletic Association State Championships ==
- Baseball - 1936
- Boys Wrestling - Wyatt Hinton (2024, Individual)
- Cross country - Chad Kincaid (1995, individual)
- Track and field - Mike Marksbury (1973, shot put), Chad Kincaid (1996, 3200 meters)

Other awards

- American football - Marc Edwards (1992 Ohio Mr. Football)

== Notable alumni ==
- Robert Bales, former Army soldier who murdered 16 Afghan civilians, in what is known as the Kandahar massacre
- Carl Bouldin, baseball player
- Marc Edwards, American football player
- Vera-Ellen, actress
- Jim Luken, labor union leader, Ohio State Representative, and Mayor of Cincinnati
- Brian Pillman, professional wrestler
- Joseph Ralston, Vice Chairman of the Joint Chiefs of Staff and Supreme Allied Commander of NATO
