= Norwood Mound =

Archaeological site in Ohio, United States

- Indian Mound
- U.S. National Register of Historic Places
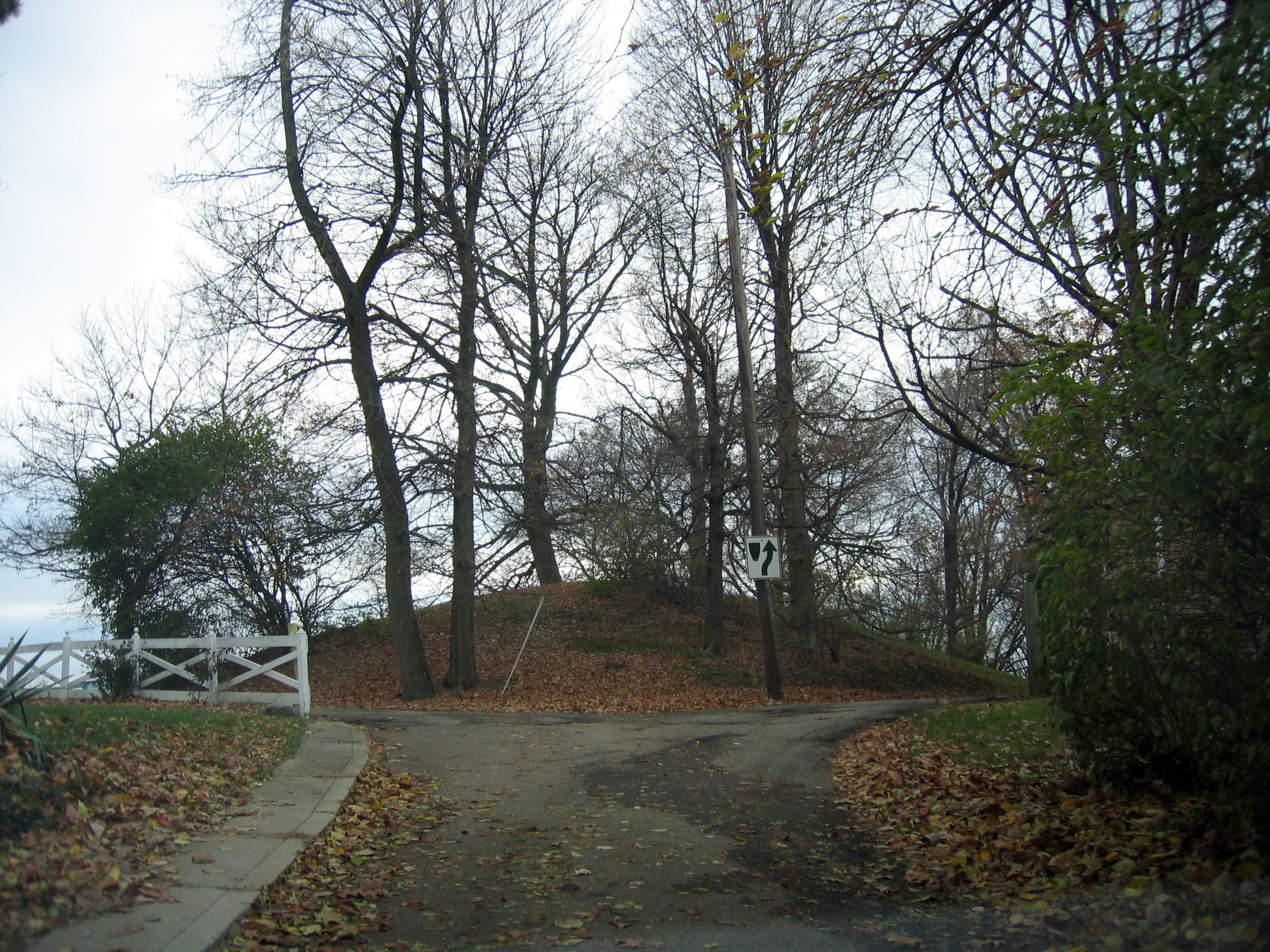

- Location within Ohio Location within the United States
- Nearest city: Norwood, Ohio
- Coordinates: 39.167841°N 84.445813°W
- Area: 1 acre (0.40 ha)
- NRHP reference No.: 74001520
- Added to NRHP: May 2, 1974

Norwood Mound, also known as “Indian Mound” by locals, is a prehistoric Native American earthwork mound located in Norwood, Ohio, United States, an enclave city of Cincinnati in Hamilton County, Ohio. It was listed on the National Register of Historic Places on May 2, 1974.

== Description ==
The mound is an elliptical earthen structure,a burial mound roughly 100 by 130 feet (30 by 40 m) in diameter and 15.5 feet (4.7 m) in height. It is originally believed to have been taller. Located within the City of Norwood's Water Tower Park at 811 feet (247 m) above sea level, the mound is the highest land elevation in Norwood and one of the highest elevations in all of southwest Ohio. The size, shape, and location of the mound suggest it was constructed by people of the Adena culture during the Pre-Columbian era. Archaeologists believe the mound was used by the Adenas for religious ceremonies and smoke signaling. An 1895 source describes it as "the only Indian mound now remaining in the vicinity of Cincinnati." There were mounds in Downtown Cincinnati at the time of arrival of the first white settlers.

== Recent history ==
There is no evidence that the site has ever been excavated or otherwise destroyed. It is reported that many relics were found in the area by early Norwood settlers in the late 1800s, and these artifacts were the original nucleus of the Native American Art Collection of the Cincinnati Art Museum.

The Norwood Heights neighborhood surrounding the mound was constructed in 1869, when it was reported that seventeen villages and towns could be seen from the summit. The site was deeded to the Village of Norwood in 1875 by Norwood settler, S. H. Parvin, prior to the incorporation of the village.

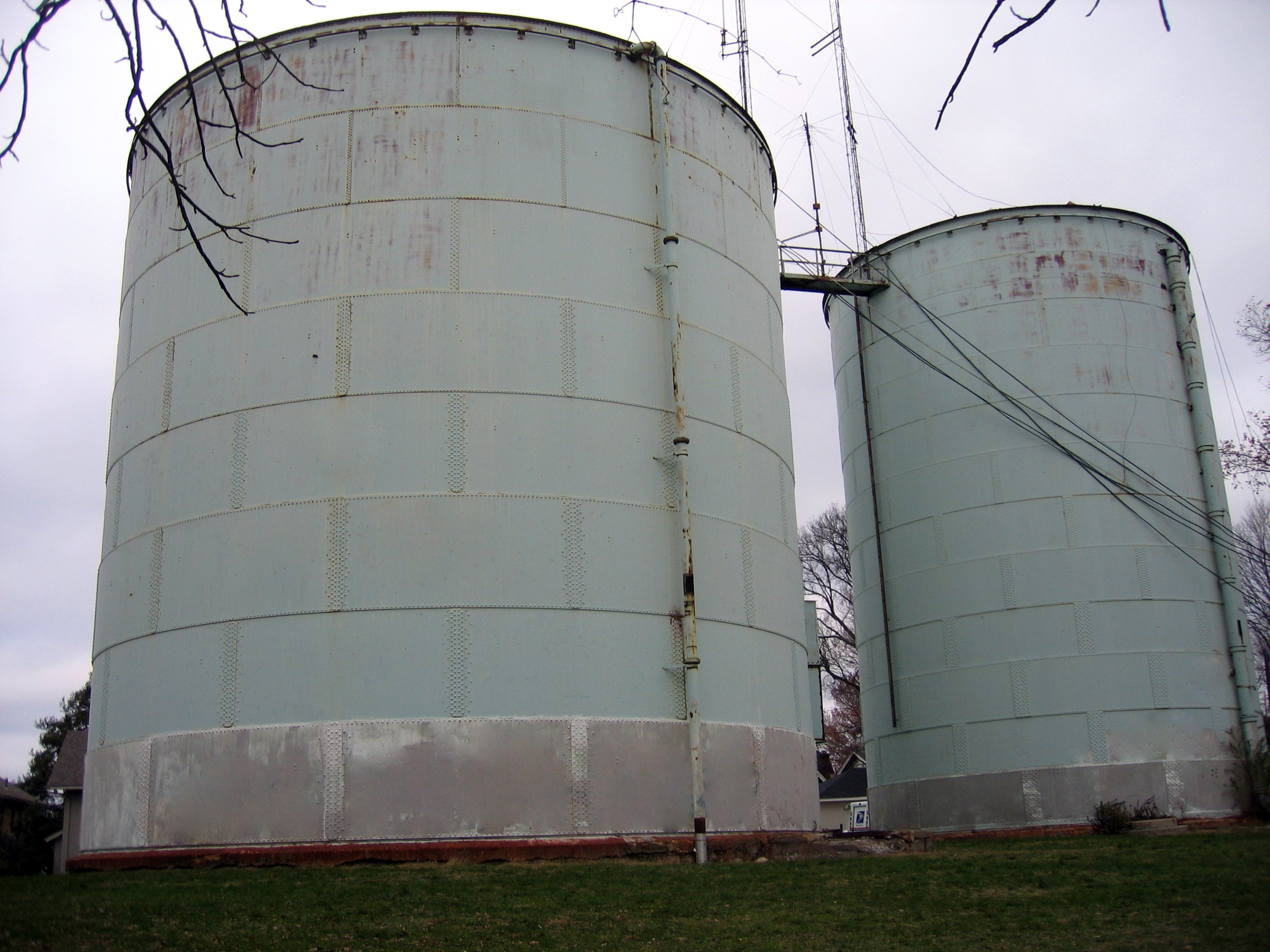
Water storage tanks in Water Tower Park

From none of the hills that skirt the Miami valley like giant sentinels is there revealed a panorama of greater grandeur than that which unfolds before the pilgrim who has scaled the heights that are crowned by the historic Indian mound. Here, upon soil that was doubtless sacred to the Red man, Norwood's water tower rises a monument to man's ingenuity and the progressive spirit of a suburb that has challenged the admiration of all its neighbors. It is a spot which must have been fashioned when Dame Nature was in one of her merriest moods.

— Mulford & Betty, Norwood, Her Homes and Her People (1894)

== See also ==
- List of burial mounds in the United States
- Mound builder (people)
- Serpent Mound
- Monks Mound
- Norwood, Ohio
