= Norwood Municipal Building =

Historic place in Ohio, United States

- U.S. National Register of Historic Places
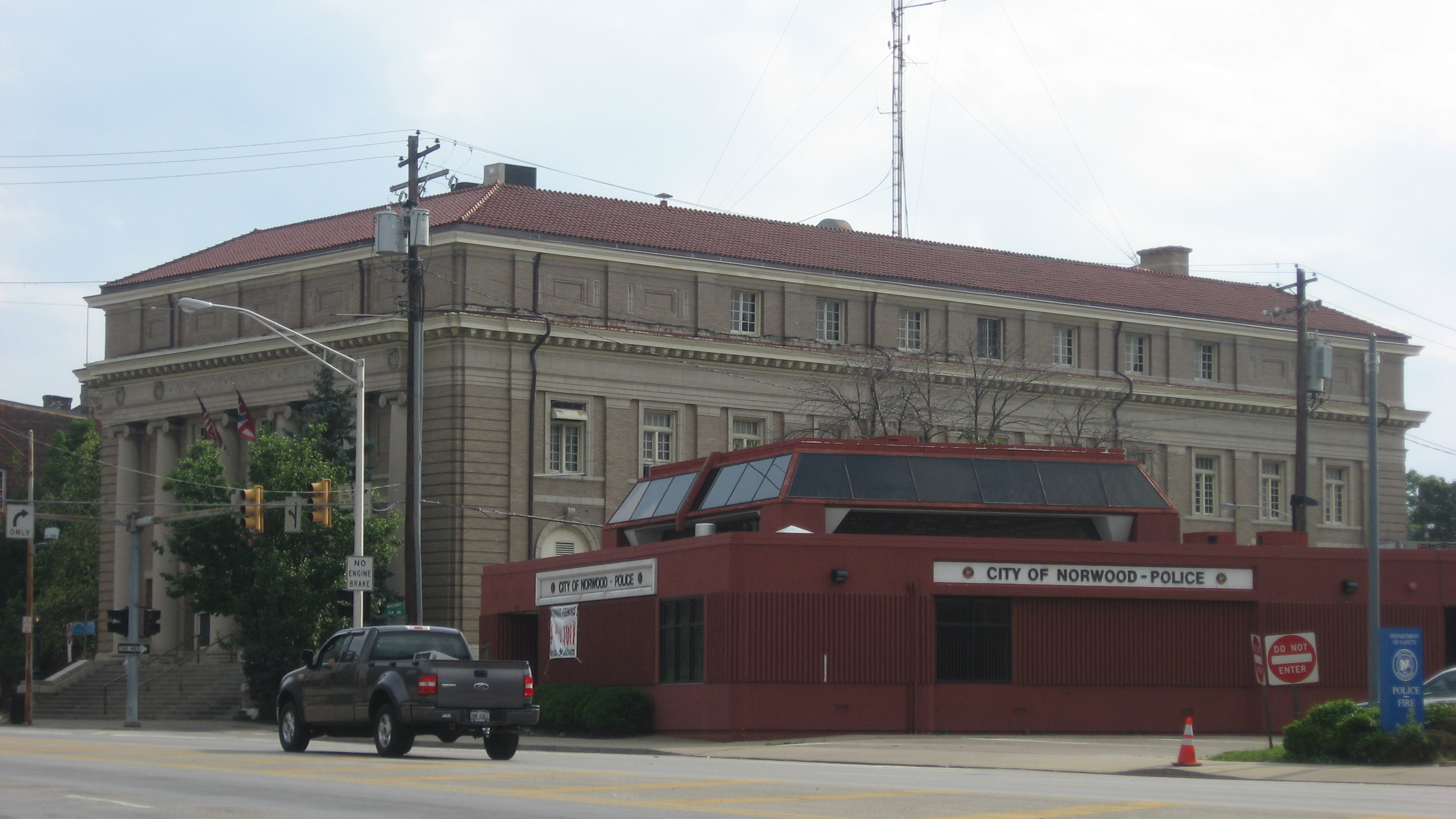
- Side of the municipal building

- Location within Ohio Location within the United States
- Location: 4645 Montgomery Rd., Norwood, Ohio
- Coordinates: 39°9′42″N 84°27′22″W
- Area: 0.7 acres (0.28 ha)
- Built: 1915
- Architect: Weber, Werner & Adkins
- Architectural style: Second Renaissance Revival
- NRHP reference No.: 80003093
- Added to NRHP: March 11, 1980

The Norwood Municipal Building, also known as Norwood City Hall, is a historic government building at 4645 Montgomery Road in Norwood, Ohio. The building was constructed in 1914-16 on the site of Norwood's first city hall, which was built in 1881. Cincinnati-based architecture firm Weber, Werner & Adkins designed the building in the Second Renaissance Revival style. The building has a gray brick exterior with limestone details; its symmetrical design includes a row of six Ionic columns across the front facade, brick quoins at its corners, a cornice adorned with modillions below the attic, and a tiled hip roof. The building's interior, which was restored in the 1970s, includes neoclassical elements such as Doric columns and egg-and-dart moldings.

The building was listed in the National Register on March 11, 1980.
