= Mr. Football (Ohio) =

Annual high school football award

The Mr. Football award has been given out annually since 1987 to the player voted by the Associated Press to be the best high school football player in the state of Ohio.

Two players have won the award twice, Erick Howard and Robert Smith. Three schools have had two different award winners, Kenton High School, Euclid High School, and Mentor High School, (Euclid High School has three total awards), and Kenton High School has the only brother pair to win, Maty and Ben Mauk.

== Award winners by year ==
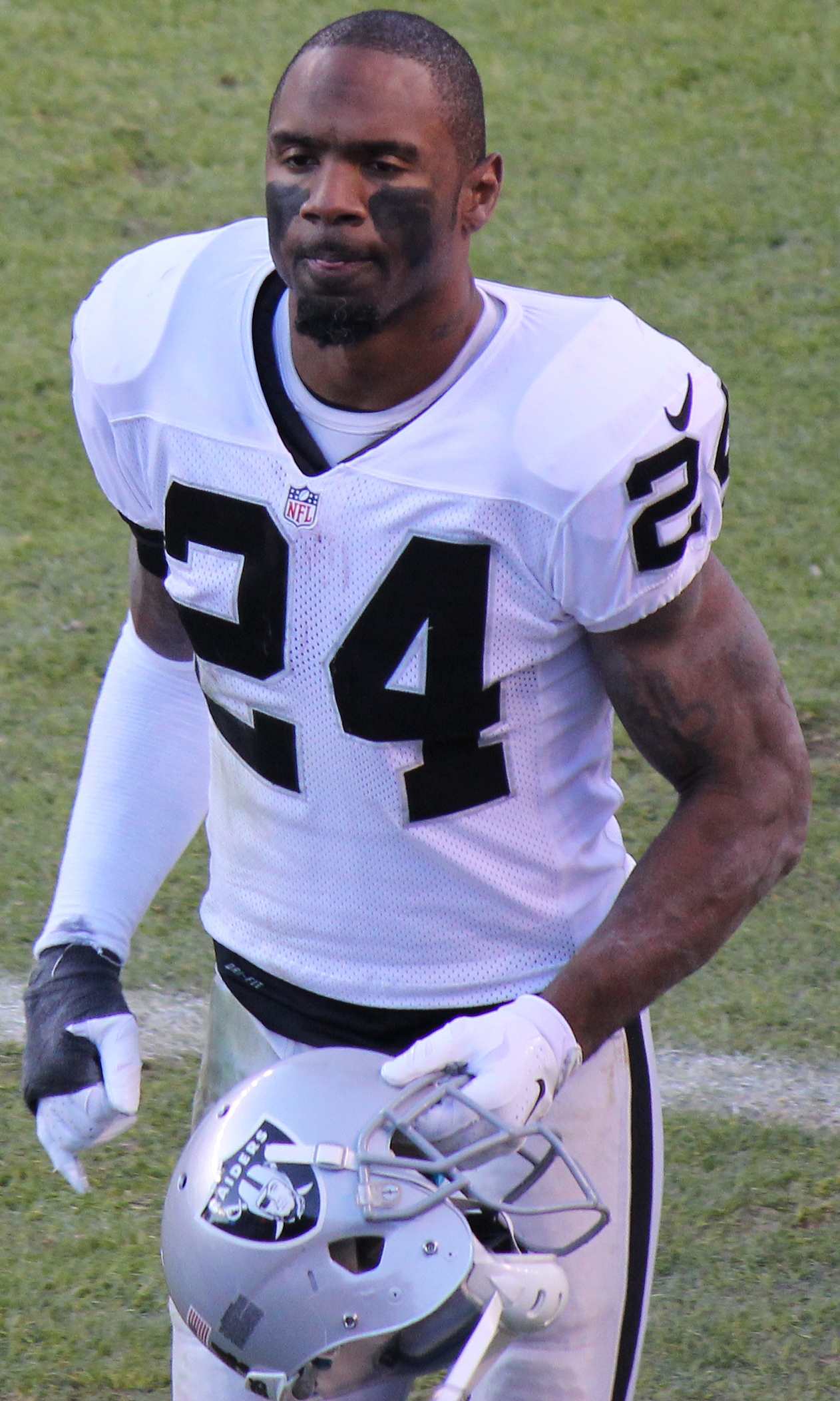
Charles Woodson was 1994's Mr. Football from Fremont Ross.

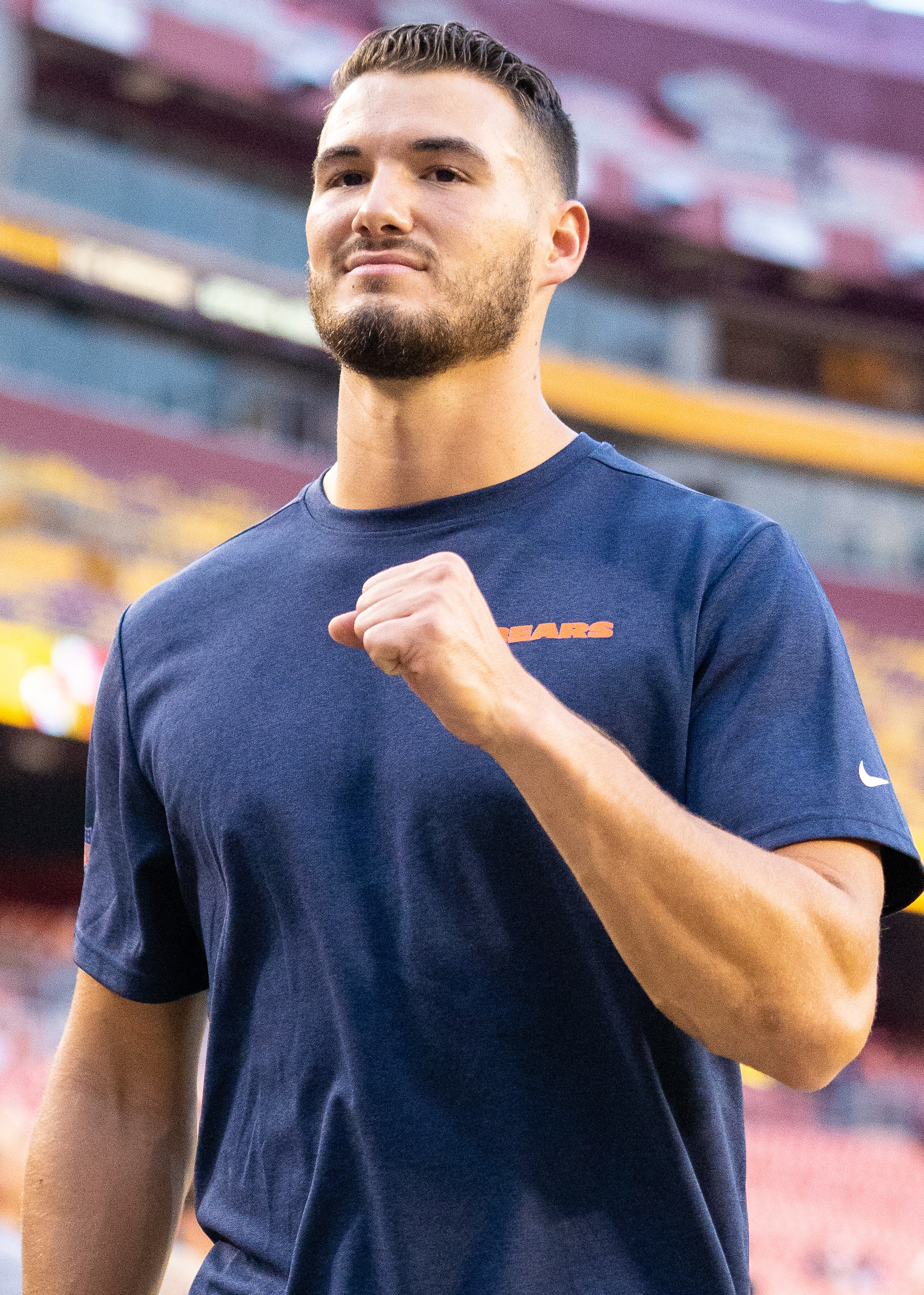
Mitch Trubisky was 2012's Mr. Football from Mentor.

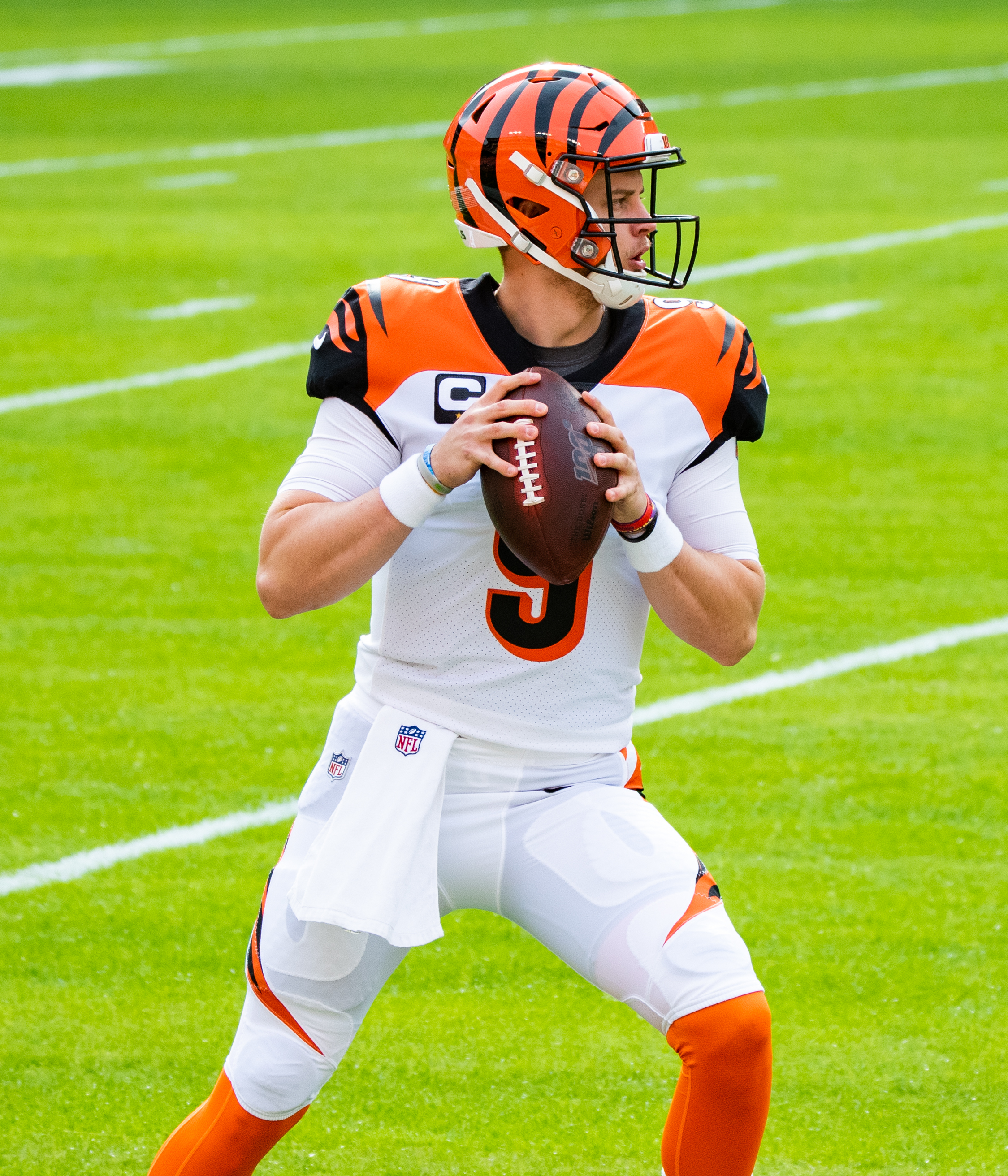
Joe Burrow was 2014's Mr. Football from Athens.

Year	Player	Position	High school	College	NFL draft	Ref.
1987	Buster Howe	RB-DB-K-P	Zanesville	Ohio State		
1988	Robert Smith	RB	Euclid	Ohio State	1993 NFL draft: 1st round, 21st overall by the Minnesota Vikings	
1989	Robert Smith	RB	Euclid	Ohio State	1993 NFL draft: 1st round, 21st overall by the Minnesota Vikings	
1990	Bobby Hoying	QB	St. Henry	Ohio State	1996 NFL draft: 3rd round, 85th overall by the Philadelphia Eagles	
1991	Derek Kidwell	QB-DE	Fostoria	Bowling Green		
1992	Marc Edwards	RB-LB	Norwood	Notre Dame	1997 NFL draft: 2nd round, 55th overall by the San Francisco 49ers	
1993	Curtis Enis	RB-LB	Mississinawa Valley	Penn State	1998 NFL draft: 1st round, 5th overall by the Chicago Bears	
1994	Charles Woodson	DB-RB	Fremont Ross	Michigan	1998 NFL draft: 1st round, 4th overall by the Oakland Raiders	
1995	Andy Katzenmoyer	LB	Westerville South	Ohio State	1999 NFL draft: 1st round, 28th overall by the New England Patriots	
1996	Derek Combs	RB-DB-KR	Grove City	Ohio State	2001 NFL draft: 7th round, 228th overall by the Oakland Raiders	
1997	Tony Fisher	RB	Euclid	Notre Dame		
1998	Ryan Brewer	RB	Troy	South Carolina		
1999	Bam Childress	DB-WR-KR	St. Peter Chanel	Ohio State		
2000	Jeff Backes	RB-DB	Upper Arlington	Northwestern		
2001	Maurice Clarett	RB	Warren G. Harding	Ohio State	2005 NFL draft: 3rd round, 101st overall by the Denver Broncos	
2002	Ben Mauk	QB	Kenton	Wake Forest; Cincinnati		
2003	Ray Williams	RB	Cleveland Benedictine	Shaw		
2004	Tyrell Sutton	RB	Archbishop Hoban	Northwestern		
2005	Delone Carter	RB	Copley	Syracuse	2011 NFL draft: 4th round, 119th overall by the Indianapolis Colts	
2006	Brandon Saine	RB	Piqua	Ohio State		
2007	Bart Tanski	QB	Mentor	Bowling Green		
2008	Erick Howard	RB	Hoover	None		
2009	Erick Howard	RB	Hoover	None		
2010	Akise Teague	RB-DB-KR	Youngstown Ursuline	Cincinnati		
2011	Maty Mauk	QB	Kenton	Missouri; Eastern Kentucky		
2012	Mitchell Trubisky	QB	Mentor	North Carolina	2017 NFL draft: 1st round, 2nd overall by the Chicago Bears	
2013	Dante Booker Jr.	LB	St. Vincent - St. Mary	Ohio State		
2014	Joe Burrow	QB	Athens	LSU	2020 NFL draft: 1st round, 1st overall by the Cincinnati Bengals	
2015	Keishaun Sims	RB-DB	Perry	Ashland		
2016	Michael Warren II	RB	Toledo Central Catholic	Cincinnati		
2017	Joey Baughman	QB	Wadsworth	Elon		
2018	Cade Stover	SS-RB	Lexington	Ohio State	2024 NFL draft: 4th round, 123rd overall by the Houston Texans	
2019	Evan Prater	QB	Wyoming	Cincinnati		
2020	Corey Kiner	RB	Roger Bacon	LSU; Cincinnati		
2021	Drew Allar	QB	Medina	Penn State	2026 NFL draft: 3rd round, 76th overall by the Pittsburgh Steelers	
2022	Lamar Sperling	RB	Hoban	Buffalo		
2023	Jordan Marshall	RB	Moeller	Michigan		
2024	Matt Ponatoski	QB	Moeller	Kentucky		
2025	Grady Kinsey	RB	Indian Valley	Air Force		

=== Schools with multiple winners ===
School	Number of awards	Years
Euclid	3	1988, 1989, 1997
Mentor	2	2007, 2012
Kenton	2	2002, 2011
Hoover	2	2008, 2009
Hoban	2	2004, 2022
Moeller	2	2023, 2024

=== Colleges with multiple winners ===
College	Number of Awards	Years
Ohio State	12	1987, 1988, 1989, 1990, 1995, 1996, 1999, 2001, 2006, 2013, 2014, 2018
Cincinnati	5	2002, 2010, 2016, 2019, 2020
Penn State	2	1993, 2021
LSU	2	2014, 2020
Bowling Green	2	1991, 2007
Michigan	2	1994, 2023
Northwestern	2	2000, 2004
Notre Dame	2	1992, 1997
