= Bart Tanski =

American football player (born 1990)

Current position
- Title: Cornerbacks coach
- Team: Kent State
- Conference: MAC

Biographical details
- Born: January 7, 1990 (age 36); Mentor, Ohio, U.S.
- Education: Bowling Green State University (2013); University of Findlay (2015); Syracuse University (2017)

Playing career
- 2008–2012: Bowling Green
- Position: Wide receiver

Coaching career (HC unless noted)
- 2013: Findlay (DB)
- 2014: Findlay (WR)
- 2015–2016: Syracuse (GA)
- 2017: Syracuse (DQC)
- 2018–2022: Robert Morris (S)
- 2023–2024: Robert Morris (STC/S)
- 2025–Present: Kent State (CB)

Bart James Tanski (born January 7, 1990) is an American former football player and current college football coach. He is the cornerbacks coach for Kent State University. He played wide receiver for the Bowling Green Falcons. He is from Mentor, Ohio and was the 2007 Ohio Mr. Football Award winner.

== Playing career ==
=== High school ===
Bart was the quarterback at Mentor High School, where he led his team to two OHSAA Division I state title games in 2006 and 2007. Bart won the Mr. Football Award in 2007; given to the best high school football player in the state of Ohio—Mentor High's first as well.

=== College ===
Despite being named Ohio's Mr. Football, Bart struggled to earn an NCAA Division I scholarship for football. He ultimately walked on the team at Bowling Green State University.

For his senior season in 2012 Tanski was named team captain for Bowling Green.

== Coaching career ==
Tanski became an assistant coach for the Syracuse Orange football team after being a graduate assistant for the Findlay Oilers. Tanski then served as cornerbacks coach for Robert Morris Colonials football. He now coaches the cornerbacks for Kent State Golden Flashes football.
