= Christian Appalachian Project =

Non-profit organization in the USA

Christian Appalachian Project Inc
- Formation: Tax-exempt since June 1966; 59 years ago
- Type: 501(c)(3)
- Tax ID no.: EIN: 610661137
- Headquarters: Paintsville
- Revenue: 224,279,340 USD (2024)
- Expenses: 222,688,913 USD (2024)
- Website: www.christianapp.org

The Christian Appalachian Project (CAP) is an interdenominational non-profit organization, based in Kentucky, US. Their mission is "building hope, transforming lives, and sharing Christ's love through service in Appalachia".

CAP was established in 1964 by Father Ralph W. Beiting. The headquarters are located in Paintsville, Kentucky.

== Serving programs ==
As the 12th-largest human services charity in the United States, CAP served 17,250 people across 13 states in 2021.

CAP receives donations from corporations and individuals and uses the goods to offset costs of its human services missions, to give to other charities and to give to victims of natural disasters.

In 2021, CAP received $135m in donations, with an expenditure of £137m.

CAP's largest mission is Operation Sharing. This mission has given away over $100 million gift-in-kind donations to more than 1,400 partner agencies and churches in all thirteen Appalachian states in 2010.

One of the components of Operation Sharing is Operation Relief. This has been used to give millions of dollars' worth of emergency supplies to those devastated by tornadoes, floods, hurricanes, and other natural disasters. This service also supplies teams of relief workers who assist victims with physical labor involved in recovering from disasters.

CAP offers after-school programs, summer camps, and educational support services for children of all ages.

Students are sent out to the areas of greatest poverty in the region to rebuild and repair homes for families and individuals struggling with substandard housing.
