= Four Bridges =

Four Bridges may refer to:

- Four Bridges in Rain and Mist, one of the 24 views of Yangzhou, China, under the Qing dynasty
- Four Bridges, Ohio, USA, a census-designated place
