= James D. Conrey House =

Historic house in Ohio, United States

- Spread Eagle Tavern-James D. Conrey House
- U.S. National Register of Historic Places
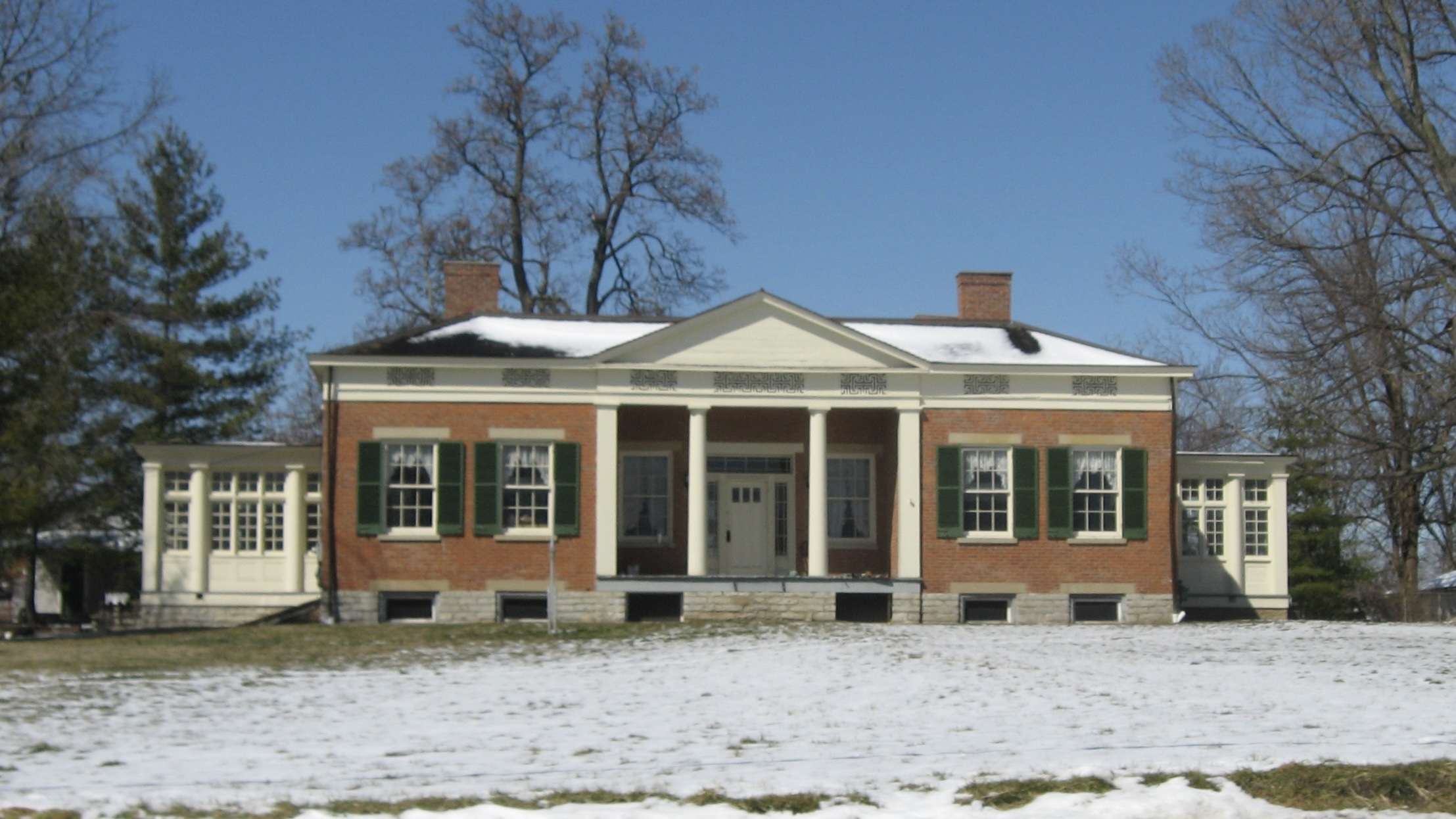
- Roadside view

- Location within Ohio Location within the United States
- Location: 9797 Cincinnati-Columbus Road north of Cincinnati
- Nearest city: West Chester Township, Butler County, Ohio
- Coordinates: 39°18′29″N 84°23′5″W
- Area: 1.8 acres (0.73 ha)
- Built: 1840
- Architectural style: Greek Revival
- NRHP reference No.: 03001100
- Added to NRHP: October 24, 2003

The James D. Conrey House is a historic house located on an old intercity road in southeastern Butler County, Ohio, United States. Although the identification is unclear, it may have once been a tavern on the road, which connects Cincinnati and Columbus. A well-preserved piece of the road's built environment, it has been designated a historic site.

The Conrey House is a brick building set on a foundation of limestone. Although the roof is primarily metal, asphalt and rubber sections are also present. The single-story facade is divided into three sections: the center, framed by a pediment and columns, with both window and door space; and the right and left, each of which is pierced by two windows. These windows are framed by cut stone windowsills and lintels, and their shutters date from the house's construction. Small friezes are placed in conjunction with the windows on the sides, and both front and side are decorated with a tall entablature. Both side and front are elevated enough to permit the placement of windows high on the basement walls, while the shallow hip roof is pierced by seven different chimneys. When erected, the building had the shape of the letter "U", with the opening to the rear, although construction in 1900 saw small porches added to the northern and southern sides and an addition to close the opening in the "U".

The early history of the Conrey House is obscure. It appears to have been constructed in 1840 by one Ellis Johns, although his involvement has not been demonstrated beyond a doubt. Popular legend holds that it was once the "Spread Eagle Tavern", an inn serving travellers between Cincinnati and Lebanon; although it sits on the old road connecting the two cities, documentation for the tavern's existence is lacking. Although a farmhouse for part of its history, it was also once a restaurant, the Colonial Farm Restaurant. The distinctive roofline serves as the origin for another of its names, "Seven Chimneys".

In late 2003, the Conrey House was listed on the National Register of Historic Places, qualifying because of its historically significant architecture. Despite the additions of 1900, and despite the sandblasting that has been applied to the walls, components such as the Doric columns and pilasters on the portico make it an exceptional piece of the Greek Revival style of architecture.
