= William H. Shideler =

American geologist and academic (1886–1958)

- Born: William Henry Shideler; 1886; West Middletown, Ohio, U.S.
- Died: 1958 (aged 71–72); Oxford, Ohio, U.S.
- Other name: "Doc"
- Education: Miami University; Cornell University
- Known for: Founder of the geology department at Miami University
- Scientific career
- Fields: geology
- Workplaces: Miami University; Hiram College
- Doctoral advisor: Henry Shaler Williams

William Henry "Doc" Shideler (July 14, 1886 – December 18, 1958) was an American geologist who was the founder and longtime chair of the Department of geology at Miami University. He was also a founder of the national college fraternity, Phi Kappa Tau.

== Early life ==
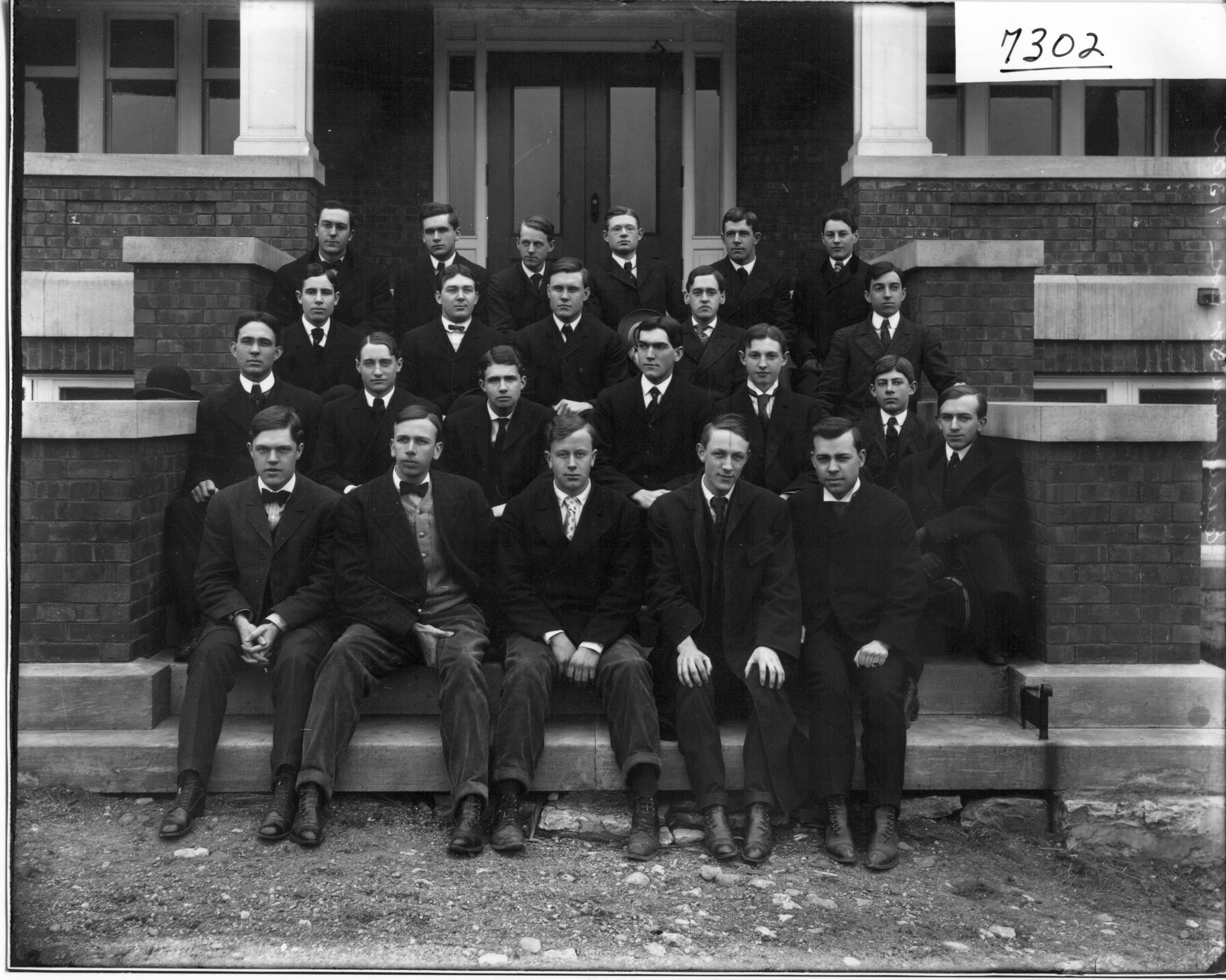
Members of the Miami University Erodelphian Literary Society, 1906. Shideler is pictured in the third row at the far right.

Shideler was born in 1886 in West Middletown, Ohio. His family moved to Hamilton, Ohio when he was quite young. In 1904 he graduated from Hamilton High School and entered Miami University in September of that year. At Miami, he was a member of the varsity track team as a distance runner and was an organizer and member of the non-fraternity intramural teams, whose activities became important to the founding of the Non-Fraternity Association, a precursor to Phi Kappa Tau.

"Doc", as he was known from his undergraduate days on, was a member of the Erodelphian Literary Society and chaired the Athletic Board of Control in his final year. A member of the campus Democratic Club, he was an outspoken progressive as an undergraduate. Shideler completed his undergraduate work in three years receiving his Bachelor of Arts degree with the class of 1907. He earned his Ph.D. in geology at Cornell University in 1910 under the direction of the eminent biostratigrapher and student of Louis Agassiz, Henry Shaler Williams.

== Academic career ==
Shideler was invited to join Miami beginning in 1910 as a member of the zoology faculty. In this capacity, he taught courses in general geology, paleontology, and organic evolution. He persuaded the Miami administration in 1920 to establish a geology department, which he chaired for thirty-six years. As a paleontologist, he became an expert on the Upper Ordovician fossils and stratigraphy that are revealed in the outcroppings and creek beds around Oxford, Ohio. In geology circles, Shideler was well known for his fossil collections, occasional publications, and professional activities. Scholars from around the world came to Miami to consult with him and study the specimens he collected. Though he was not a prolific writer, Shideler freely shared information and research, which led to many scholarly publications and Ph.D. theses. He amassed an outstanding collection of type specimens and Upper Ordovician materials for Miami. Thirteen species, three genera, one family, and one mountain (Mount Shideler) in Antarctica were named for him as "a geologist's way of passing a compliment," he once said. He was a fellow of the American Academy of Arts and Sciences and the Ohio Academy of Science and served as president of the Ohio Academy in 1951. He was a member of Phi Beta Kappa, Sigma Xi, Phi Sigma, Sigma Gamma Epsilon (served as national vice president for 19 years), Omicron Delta Kappa and the Geology Society of America and he was past president of the American Geology Teachers organization.

He served as Miami University's representative to the NCAA and was chairman of the Mid-American Conference. He deferred his retirement from Miami three times, finally giving up the chairmanship of his department in 1956. When he retired the following year, he was the recipient of a John Hay Whitney Foundation grant to go to Hiram College to start a geology program there, much as he had done for Miami in 1920. He was a professor of geology at Hiram in 1957–58.

== Personal life ==
Shideler married Katherine Hoffman. They had two sons, James Henry Shideler, a noted professor of history at the University of California-Davis, and William Watson Shideler.

Shideler held almost every national office with Phi Kappa Tau, including a term as national president from 1913 to 1914. He was instrumental in bringing the fraternity's national headquarters to Oxford in 1930, where it was within a block of his home and campus office. The Shidelers lived in a historic Oxford home that had belonged to David Swing and was later used in filming the Jodie Foster movie Little Man Tate.

Shideler died on December 18, 1958, in Oxford, Ohio. He is buried in the Miami University plot of the Oxford Cemetery, next to his wife.

== Honors and legacy ==
Phi Kappa Tau's highest undergraduate award has been known as the Shideler Award and has been presented to the fraternity's outstanding graduating seniors since 1938.

In 1967, Miami University named its new earth science building William H. Shideler Hall in his memory. The Karl Limper Geology Museum in Shideler Hall has as its basis the huge collection of specimens amassed by Dr. Shideler.
