= West Liberty, Ohio (disambiguation) =

West Liberty, Ohio is a village in Logan County, Ohio, United States.

West Liberty, Ohio may also refer to:

- West Liberty, Crawford County, Ohio, an unincorporated community
- West Liberty, Morrow County, Ohio, an unincorporated community
- a former name of Poasttown, Ohio, an unincorporated community in Butler County

== See also ==
- Liberty, Ohio, an unincorporated community in Montgomery County
- East Liberty, Ohio, an unincorporated community in Logan County
