= Ollie Johns =

American baseball player (1879–1961)

- Pitcher
- Born: August 21, 1879; Trenton, Ohio, U.S.
- Died: June 17, 1961 (aged 81); Hamilton, Ohio, U.S.
- Batted: Left Threw: Left

MLB debut
- September 24, 1905, for the Cincinnati Reds

Last MLB appearance
- September 30, 1905, for the Cincinnati Reds

MLB statistics
- Win–loss record: 1–0
- Earned run average: 3.50
- Strikeouts: 8
- Stats at Baseball Reference

Teams
- Cincinnati Reds (1905)

Oliver Tracy Johns (August 21, 1879 – June 17, 1961) was an American Major League Baseball pitcher. He was born in Trenton, Ohio. He played in four games for the 1905 Cincinnati Reds. He is buried with his wife Nina in the Miltonville Cemetery in Miltonville, Ohio.
