= Port Union =

Port Union may refer to:

- Port Union, Newfoundland and Labrador, Canada
- Port Union, Ohio, United States
- Port Union, Toronto, a neighborhood in Toronto, Ontario, Canada
