= Olde West Chester, Ohio =

- Census-designated place
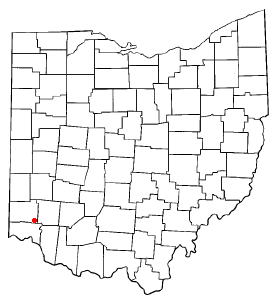
- Location of Olde West Chester, Ohio
- Coordinates: 39°20′07″N 84°24′13″W
- Country: United States
- State: Ohio
- County: Butler
- Township: West Chester

Area
  - Total: 0.36 sq mi (0.93 km^{2})
  - Land: 0.36 sq mi (0.93 km^{2})
  - Water: 0 sq mi (0.00 km^{2})
- Elevation: 712 ft (217 m)

Population (2020)
  - Total: 201
  - Density: 562.7/sq mi (217.27/km^{2})
- Time zone: UTC-5 (Eastern (EST))
  - Summer (DST): UTC-4 (EDT)
- FIPS code: 39-58149
- GNIS feature ID: 2393173

Olde West Chester is a census-designated place (CDP) in West Chester Township, Butler County, Ohio, United States. The population was 201 at the 2020 census.

== History ==
Olde West Chester was originally known as Mechanicsburg, and under the latter name was laid out in 1817 by Hezekiah Smith.

== Geography ==
Originally called simply "West Chester", Olde West Chester is located in the center of West Chester Township and is bordered to the west by the CDP of Beckett Ridge.

Interstate 75 forms the northwestern edge of the CDP, with access from Exit 21 to the north and Exit 19 to the south. Cincinnati-Dayton Road, formerly U.S. Route 25, the Dixie Highway, is the main street through the community. Downtown Cincinnati is 19 miles (31 km) to the south, and Dayton is 34 miles (55 km) to the north.

According to the United States Census Bureau, the Olde West Chester CDP has a total area of 0.35 square miles (0.9 km^{2}), all land.

== Demographics ==
Historical population
Census	Pop.	Note	%±
2020	201		—
U.S. Decennial Census

As of the census of 2000, there were 232 people, 85 households, and 62 families residing in the CDP. The population density was 666.8 inhabitants per square mile (257.5/km^{2}). There were 91 housing units at an average density of 261.6 per square mile (101.0/km^{2}). The racial makeup of the CDP was 91.38% White, 4.31% African American, 1.29% Native American, 1.29% Asian, 1.29% from other races, and 0.43% from two or more races. Hispanic or Latino of any race were 1.72% of the population.

There were 85 households, out of which 41.2% had children under the age of 18 living with them, 58.8% were married couples living together, 11.8% had a female householder with no husband present, and 25.9% were non-families. 15.3% of all households were made up of individuals, and 4.7% had someone living alone who was 65 years of age or older. The average household size was 2.73 and the average family size was 3.10.

In the CDP, the population was spread out, with 26.7% under the age of 18, 5.2% from 18 to 24, 36.2% from 25 to 44, 23.3% from 45 to 64, and 8.6% who were 65 years of age or older. The median age was 37 years. For every 100 females, there were 96.6 males. For every 100 females age 18 and over, there were 88.9 males.

The median income for a household in the CDP was $85,159, and the median income for a family was $87,187. Males had a median income of $45,357 versus $31,667 for females. The per capita income for the CDP was $29,342. About 11.9% of families and 7.9% of the population were below the poverty line, including none of those under the age of eighteen and 50.0% of those 65 or over.
