= Lakota Local School District (Butler County) =

School district in Ohio

Lakota Local Schools
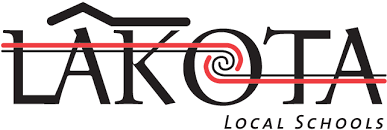

Location
- West Chester and Liberty Townships, Butler County Ohio United States

District information
- Type: Public-Suburban
- Grades: K–12
- Established: 1956; 70 years ago
- Superintendent: Ashley Whitely
- Schools: 23

Students and staff
- Students: 17,477 (August 2026)
- Teachers: 704 (August 2024)
- Staff: 2000 (August 2024)
- Athletic conference: Greater Miami Conference

Other information
- Website: www.lakotaonline.com

Lakota Local Schools is a public school district serving students from West Chester and Liberty townships in Butler County, Ohio, in the northern suburbs of Cincinnati. Serving nearly 15,000 students, it is the largest school district in Butler County, second largest in southwestern Ohio and the seventh largest in the U.S. state of Ohio. It operates six early childhood (PK–2) schools, eight elementary schools, four junior high schools, two freshman schools and two high schools.

Lakota was rated 'Excellent with Distinction' in the most recent Ohio Department of Education report card (2010–11), ranking in the top 7% of school districts statewide. They met 26 of 26 state indicators and had a graduation rate of over 95%. It is the largest school district in the state to earn the 'Excellent' designation.

The current superintendent as of August 2024 is Ashley Whitely. She was previously assistant superintendent of Wyoming City Schools and an English teacher at Lakota East High School. She replaced previous superintendent Matt Miller who resigned in January 2023 and interim superintendent Elizabeth Lolli who was the superintendent for the 2023–2024 school year.

== History ==
The district in its current configuration was established in 1957 after the Union and Liberty school districts were combined. The district was originally known as the Liberty-Union School District and was renamed to Lakota Local School District in 1970.

Two of the district's schools, Union Elementary (1916) and Liberty Elementary (1928), were built prior to the consolidation. Liberty Elementary is still standing but Union Elementary has since been demolished. In 1959, the Board of Education built a high school for the district; three years later, a third elementary (Hopewell) was added.

From 1969 to 1978, three junior schools were built. The first, Lakota Junior School (1969), was built next to the high school and was later used as a freshman wing of the high school, and then the Lakota Early Childhood Center. It is now used to house the Creekside Early Childhood School. Hopewell Junior was opened in 1973, and Lakota Junior was replaced by Liberty Junior when it opened in 1976. Adena Elementary became the district's fourth when it opened in 1978.

Freedom Elementary opened in 1988, the same year an addition was built onto the high school. Two years later in 1990, Woodland and Shawnee elementary opened their doors. From 1992 to 1994, three new elementary schools (Heritage-1992, Cherokee, and Independence-1994), and a separate freshman building (1993) were built, as well as additions to six other buildings.

1997 marked the largest expansion to the Lakota district. In that year, two new high schools were opened (Lakota East and Lakota West). Freshmen were moved to the old high school building, and the freshman building became a third junior school (Lakota Ridge). Kindergarten students from most of the elementary schools were consolidated into the Lakota Early Childhood Center, which also holds preschool classes.

In 2003, Van Gorden Elementary (named after the family that donated the land it sits on) and Lakota Plains Junior School were opened, along with a new Central Office Building.

Starting from the school year 2007–08, there were many transfers throughout the district. New schools were being built and some students, as well as staff, were relocated to new schools. Lakota East Freshman school opened in the 2008–2009 school year for students who will attend Lakota East. The building that once contained freshmen for both high schools (which was once the old high school itself previous to 1997), became Lakota West Freshman for the students who will attend Lakota West.

On Labor Day in September 2023, a fire in the Hopewell Junior building broke out in the coach’s office. Smoke was covering the whole building, but the fire stayed in the lower basement level. The building did not have sprinklers at the time due to its age. The cause of the fire was accidental. Fire Chief Rick Prinz stated an extension cord coiled up under sweaty jerseys and tents most likely causes the fire. It also included a lithium ion battery which further increased the fire. All classes were canceled for the rest of the week at the main building, but all classes moved to a near by church. When the building was able to be reoccupied, choir, band, all lunch periods, and more stayed at the church. Core instruction classes moved back to Hopewell.

== Athletics ==
The Lakota district competes in the Greater Miami Conference (GMC) in 24 varsity sports.

State Team Championships (OHSAA)
| 1983 | Boys Cross Country | Lakota |
| 1984 | Girls Cross Country | Lakota |
| 1992 | Boys Basketball | Lakota |
| 1994 | Girls Volleyball | Lakota |
| 1999 | Girls Soccer | Lakota West |
| 2000 | Boys Golf | Lakota West |
| 2006 | Girls Golf | Lakota West |
| 2007 | Boys Baseball | Lakota West |
| 2011 | Boys Baseball | Lakota East |
| 2020 | Cross Country | Lakota West |
| 2022 | Girls Softball | Lakota West |

Individual Lakota State Champions
LAKOTA
| 1990 | Karl Bludworth | Wrestling - 103 Weight Class |
LAKOTA EAST
| 1998 | Brian Godsey | Track - 3200 Meter Run |
| | Brian Godsey | Cross Country |
| 2000 | Lindsey Zinn | Cross Country |
| 2001 | Hetag Pliev | Wrestling - 171 Weight Class |
| | Lindsey Zinn | Track - 1600 Meter Run |
| | Erik Reynolds | Track - High Jump |
| 2002 | Hetag Pliev | Wrestling - 189 Weight Class |
| 2004 | Tony Johnson | Wrestling - 275 Weight Class |
| 2005 | Matthew Peters, Chris Keefer, William Johnson, Jason Fisher | Track - 3200 Meter Relay |
LAKOTA WEST
| 2001 | Matt McIntire | Wrestling - 135 Weight Class |
| 2002 | Matt McIntire | Wrestling - 140 Weight Class |
| 2003 | Zach Flake | Wrestling - 135 Weight Class |
| 2006 | Amanda Burger | Cross Country |
| 2007 | Bo Touris | wrestling 112 Weight Class |

== Schools ==
=== Secondary (9–12) ===
- Lakota East High School
- Lakota West High School
- Lakota Central High School
- Lakota East Freshman Campus(2008)
- Lakota West Freshman Campus(1960, 1997)

=== Middle (7–8) ===
- Hopewell Junior School(1973)
- Liberty Junior School(1977)
- Lakota Plains Junior School(2003)
- Lakota Ridge Junior School(1997)

=== Elementary (3–6) ===
- Adena Elementary School(1978)
- Cherokee Elementary School(1992)
- Endeavor Elementary School(2007)
- Freedom Elementary School(1988)
- Independence Elementary School(1994)
- Union Elementary School(1916)
- Van Gorden Elementary School(2003)
- Woodland Elementary School(1990)

=== Primary (PK–2) ===
- Creekside Early Childhood School
- Liberty Early Childhood School(2008)
- Shawnee Early Childhood School
- Wyandot Early Childhood School(2007)
- Hopewell Early Childhood School(2018)
- Heritage Early Childhood School(2018)

=== Facility Planning ===
Lakota, like many other neighboring districts, struggles with capacity issues in all buildings. Lakota Local Schools is currently working on a Master Facilities Plan (MFP) to build, close, and repurpose current schools to fit the growing needs of the district. Many schools in the district have received barely sufficient or insufficient in terms of building condition. The current plan, approved by the school board in June 2026, plans on placing a bond issue on the November 2026 ballot. Its said if the voters approve the issue, the 2.2 million bond issue would not begin the collections until 2029, this would fund phase one of MFP. When phase one construction is complete, Adena Elementary, Ridge Junior and the West Freshman/Creekside/Lakota Central building will close. The total number of school buildings would drop from 21 to 18.
