= Maud, Ohio =

Unincorporated community in Ohio, U.S.

Coordinates: 39°21′19″N 84°23′25″W

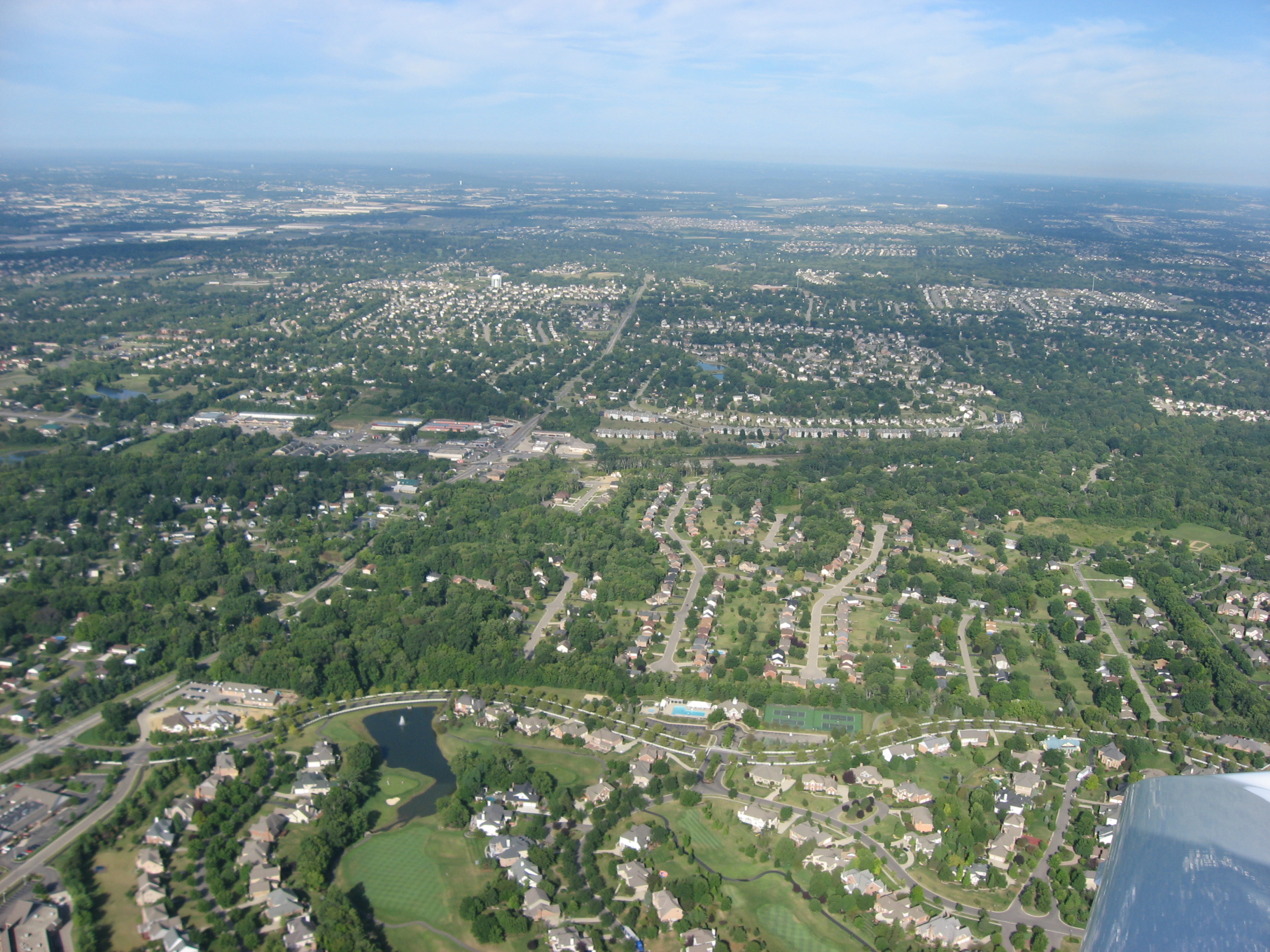
Maud and its vicinity

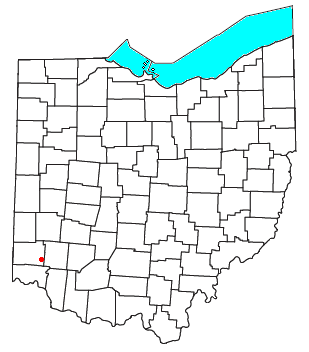
Location of Mauds, Ohio

Maud is an unincorporated community in central West Chester Township, Butler County, Ohio, United States, located on Cincinnati–Dayton Road (also known as the Dixie Highway). Originally called Shoemaker, it was renamed for Richard Maud, the town's first postmaster and was formerly a stop on the Dayton Short Line, which became part of the Big Four Railroad. An important road in West Chester and Liberty Townships is Mauds Hughes Road.

Around the late 1860s or early 1870s, Maud was the site of an attempt by a local entrepreneur to construct a mill that worked via perpetual motion. A large crowd gathered to watch the mill start, and when it did not, laughter ensued. Nothing was heard from the unnamed entrepreneur again, and the mill quickly vanished. The local newspapers did not record the event, and the only record of its occurrence was transmitted by elderly residents of Maud to one William Marion Miller of Miami University in Oxford, Ohio.
