= Xavier University MBA Program =

Xavier University's MBA program is the master's degree in business administration program offered by Xavier University in Cincinnati. The Xavier MBA has received regional praise as the "best reputation in the Midwest for an MBA", according to The Princeton Review. The university's part-time MBA program is nationally ranked 14th in the 2010 U.S. News & World Report.

== Degree options ==
Xavier University's MBA degree is offered in several formats to meet the needs of its students. An evening program is available and offers working professional students weekday evening courses and flexibility on the time frame to complete the degree requirements. Also aimed for working professional students, a weekend option allows students who travel during the week to complete the degree requirements during weekends. An Executive MBA is designed for experienced business leaders who have been tapped by their respective organizations for executive roles. Xavier University also conducts MBA courses in off-campus locations in West Chester, Ohio and Deerfield Township, Ohio.

Xavier sponsors the Momentum Program for students who completed their undergraduate degree and wish to continue their education through a full-time MBA program.

== See also ==
- AACSB
- Xavier University
- Distance MBA
