= Wetherington, Ohio =

- Census-designated place
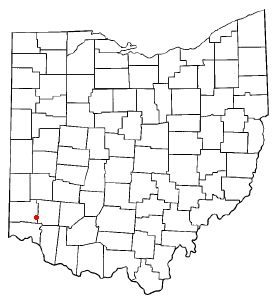
- Location of Wetherington, Ohio
- Coordinates: 39°21′48″N 84°22′26″W
- Country: United States
- State: Ohio
- County: Butler
- Township: West Chester

Area
  - Total: 0.91 sq mi (2.35 km^{2})
  - Land: 0.91 sq mi (2.35 km^{2})
  - Water: 0 sq mi (0.00 km^{2})
- Elevation: 860 ft (260 m)

Population (2020)
  - Total: 1,381
  - Density: 1,524/sq mi (588.6/km^{2})
- Time zone: UTC-5 (Eastern (EST))
  - Summer (DST): UTC-4 (EDT)
- FIPS code: 39-84528
- GNIS feature ID: 2393847

Wetherington is a census-designated place (CDP) in West Chester Township, Butler County, Ohio, United States. The population was 1,381 at the 2020 census.

== Geography ==
Wetherington is located in northeastern West Chester Township. It surrounds Wetherington Golf and Country Club, and is bordered on its east side by Interstate 75, with access from Exit 22 (Tylersville Road). It is 22 miles (35 km) north of downtown Cincinnati.

Wetherington can be accessed from gated entrances at Cincinnati-Dayton and Tylersville Road, or through entrances at Liberty Way. The gates at the entrances were erected in 2002, making Wetherington the largest gated community in south-western Ohio at the time. This privatization was criticized for restricting public access to publicly funded roads, creating a physical boundary between lower and upper class citizens, and for symbolically being contrary to the free and democratic ideals of American society. The ostensible reason for the gate's construction was to eliminate heavy traffic from commuters using the neighborhood's roads as a shortcut between Cincinnati-Dayton and Tylersville Road.

According to the United States Census Bureau, the CDP has a total area of 0.89 square miles (2.3 km^{2}), all land.

== Demographics ==
Historical population
Census	Pop.	Note	%±
2020	1,381		—
U.S. Decennial Census

As of the census of 2000, there were 1,010 people, 363 households, and 308 families residing in the CDP. The population density was 1,447.9 inhabitants per square mile (559.0/km^{2}). There were 450 housing units at an average density of 645.1 per square mile (249.1/km^{2}). The racial makeup of the CDP was 94.55% White, 2.77% African American, 1.58% Asian, 0.10% Pacific Islander, 0.10% from other races, and 0.89% from two or more races. Hispanic or Latino of any race were 1.58% of the population.

There were 363 households, out of which 38.0% had children under the age of 18 living with them, 80.7% were married couples living together, 3.0% had a female householder with no husband present, and 14.9% were non-families. 12.9% of all households were made up of individuals, and 3.9% had someone living alone who was 65 years of age or older. The average household size was 2.78 and the average family size was 3.06.

In the CDP, the population was spread out, with 26.9% under the age of 18, 5.4% from 18 to 24, 26.1% from 25 to 44, 37.2% from 45 to 64, and 4.3% who were 65 years of age or older. The median age was 40 years. For every 100 females, there were 98.8 males. For every 100 females age 18 and over, there were 96.3 males.

The median income for a household in the CDP was $161,448, and the median income for a family was $173,704. Males had a median income of $100,000 versus $65,050 for females. The per capita income for the CDP was $73,684. About 1.8% of families and 2.4% of the population were below the poverty line, including 2.8% of those under age 18 and none of those age 65 or over.

== Notable person ==
John Boehner, Former House of Representatives Speaker
