= Karl Limper Geology Museum =

Geology museum at Miami University, Ohio

Coordinates: 39.50806°N 84.73186°W

The Karl Limper Geology Museum is located in Shideler Hall at Miami University in Oxford, Ohio. It is located off the lobby on the main level of the building. The museum was established in 1968 and contains a collection of ore minerals, meteorites, and a 16 inch trilobite. Much of the basis of the collection was collected by William H. Shideler, founder of Miami's geology program. The museum was funded by donations from alumni including James Wolff.
