= Butler County Regional Airport =

Butler County Regional Airport Hogan Field
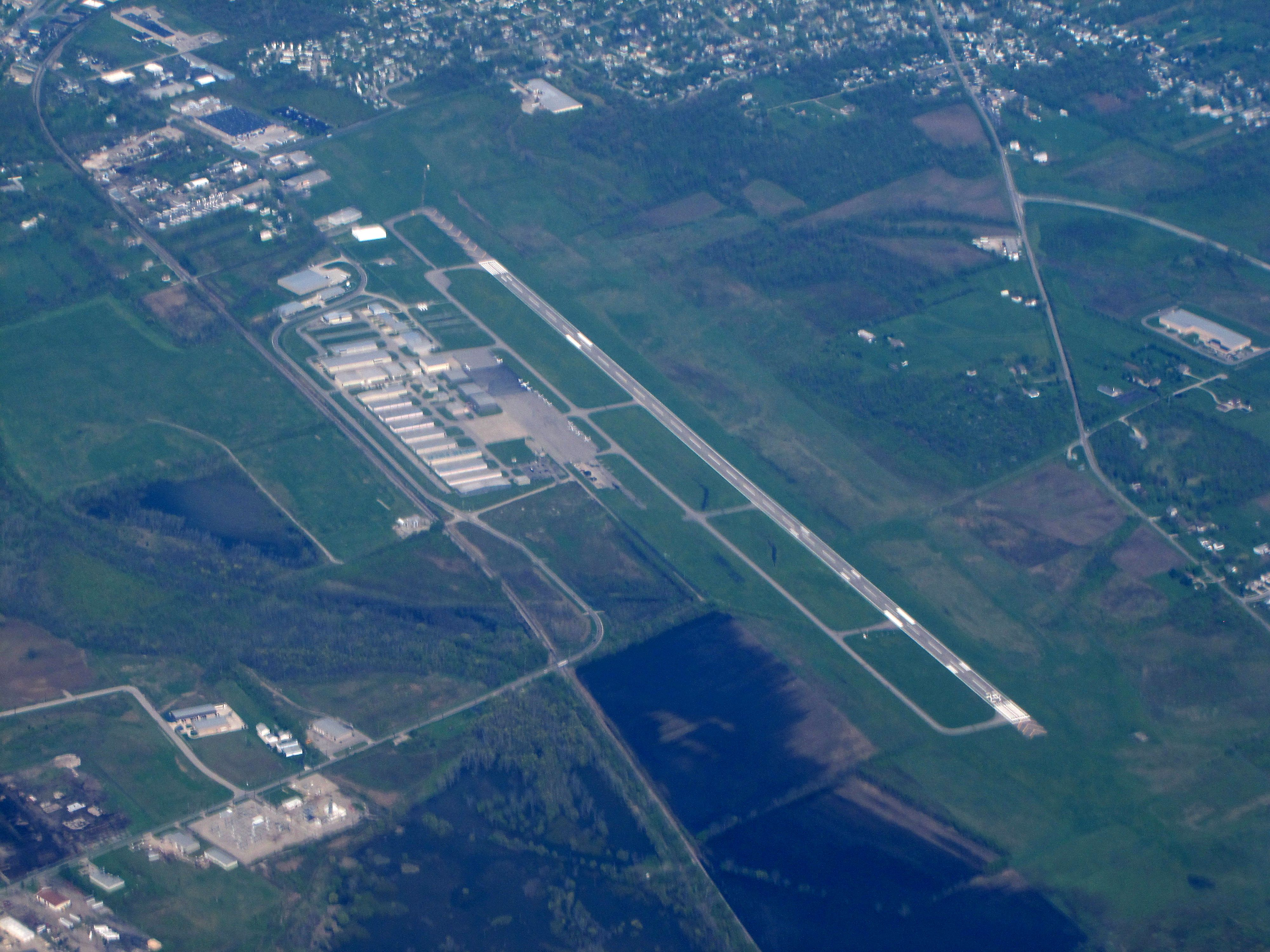
- IATA: HAO; ICAO: KHAO; FAA LID: HAO

Summary
- Airport type: Public
- Owner: Butler County Board of Commissioners
- Serves: Hamilton, Ohio
- Location: Hamilton, Ohio
- Time zone: UTC−05:00 (-5)
  - Summer (DST): UTC−04:00 (-4)
- Elevation AMSL: 632 ft (193 m)
- Coordinates: 39°21′49.5″N 084°31′19″W
- Website: Butler County Regional Airport

Map
- Location of airport in Ohio HAO (the United States)

Runways
Direction	Length		Surface
Direction	ft	m	Surface
11/29	5,500	1,676	Asphalt

Statistics (2022)
- Aircraft operations (year ending 9/22/2022): 55,228
- Based aircraft: 116
- Source: Federal Aviation Administration

Butler County Regional Airport (IATA: HAO, ICAO: KHAO, FAA LID: HAO) (Hogan Field) is a publicly owned, public use airport at 2820 Airport Road East in Hamilton, Ohio, United States. It is owned by the Butler County Board of Commissioners.

== History ==
The airport was founded in July 1929 by a member of the Hogan family. The airport closed briefly in 1932 because the family could not afford to operate it during the Great Depression. Damage was done to the airport that year when a tornado moved through, damaging the only hangar the airport had. Soon after the airport was closed, the entire family built up the money to buy the land the airport was on and reopen it. They also opened a restaurant at the airport.

The Civil Pilot Training Act of 1939 helped the airport to expand. The Hogans also trained pilots in partnership with Miami University, and the War Department leased the airport for pilot training under the Civil Aviation Authority. Over 300 pilots were trained at the airport during World War II, including for the Civil Air Patrol.

The Hogan family operated charter services at the airport during and after World War II. Flights most often operated between nearby cities in Ohio such as Cincinnati and Dayton.

A group of employees from General Electric Aircraft Engines founded the Jet Flyers' Club at the airport in the early 1950s.

The airport saw a number of improvements throughout the 1960s and 1970s. The runway was paved and lengthened twice, new hangars were constructed, a lighting system was added, and new radio navigation equipment was installed.

By September 1980, the city of Hamilton had paid for a master plan for the airport and was considering attempting to obtain federal funds to acquire it. It was purchased by Hamilton, Fairfield and Butler counties in 1984. A master plan was completed in 1992. The runway was widened and lengthened in 1998.

Prior to 2000, it was known as Hamilton-Fairfield Airport.

After being fired in 2017, the former airport manager sued the airport and Butler County, alleging he was fired after questioning how airport terminal construction was paid for and warehouse space rented by the Butler County Sheriff's Office at the airport, claiming both issues may have details in violation with FAA regulation. Most importantly, he claimed the airport was storing non-aviation equipment rent-free and that Butler County was applying "indirect expenses" like liability insurance to the airport budget.

A historical marker was built at the airport in 2018.

In 2021, the airport received a $2 million grant from the Federal Aviation Administration to continue runway rehabilitation efforts. The project was part of the airport's 10-year capital improvement plan, which itself cost nearly $4 million. In March 2025, it was announced that the airport plans to receive infrastructure to support electric aircraft.

== Facilities ==
The airport covers 650 acres (2.6 km^{2}). Its asphalt runway, designated as runway 11/29, measures 5,500 by 100 feet (1,676 m × 30 m).

For the 12-month period ending September 22, 2022, the airport had 55,228 aircraft operations, average 152 per day: 80% general aviation and 20% air taxi. 116 aircraft were then based at the airport at the time: 101 single-engine, 10 multi-engine airplanes, 2 jets, 2 helicopters, and 1 glider.

The airport has a fixed-base operator that offers fuel – both avgas and jet fuel – and services such as general maintenance, catering, courtesy transportation, rental cars, conference rooms, a crew lounge, snooze rooms, showers, and more.

The airport is home to Butler Tech's Aviation Exploration pathway, which educates approximately fifty high school juniors and seniors each year in avionics and aviation maintenance.

== Operations ==
Flying lessons and aircraft rental are available at the airport.

The airport is home to a chapter of the Experimental Aircraft Association, which hosts regular events at the airport.

== Accidents and incidents ==
- On 22 January 1966, a Lockheed T-33 crashed while making an emergency landing at the airport, killing the passenger.
- On June 13, 2004, an Aviat Pitts S2B was substantially damaged while landing at the Butler County Regional Airport. The pilot reported that, after touchdown, the right landing gear brake stuck. The airplane veered to the left, departed the runway surface, and struck a taxiway sign with the right wing. The right landing gear assembly collapsed, and the airplane came to rest in a grass area. The probable cause of the accident was found to be the pilot's failure to maintain directional control after experiencing a brake system malfunction during landing.
- On April 29, 2007, a Cessna 210D was substantially damaged when it impacted terrain following an attempted go around. The pilot stated that she thought she flared the aircraft a little too soon upon landing and the wind ballooned the nose up. She then applied power and the aircraft came down. A witness, who was taxiing to the runway at the time, said that he saw the accident airplane about 30 feet above the ground, wobbling its wings severely left to right, with the airplane nose high. Then the left wing dipped down, the airplane turned approximately 180 degrees, the left wing impacted the ground, and the nose crashed into the ground. The probable cause of the accident was found to be the pilot's failure to maintain control of the aircraft.
- On April 14, 2010, a pilot was completing taxi tests in a Rand-Robinson KR2 when the aircraft became airborne. The pilot decided to take the plane flying and returned to the airport after 40 minutes. He stated that, during the landing, he was fast because he was attempting a wheel landing. The airplane bounced and the airplane came back down hard. The airplane's retractable main landing gear collapsed and the airplane skidded to a stop on its belly. The probable cause of the accident was found to be the pilot's improper flare resulting in a hard landing and collapsed landing gear.
- On July 4, 2017, a Waco YMF experienced a gear collapse after landing at the Butler County Regional Airport. The pilot reported that he just completed a local flight and was landing on runway 11. After a routine touchdown and roll out, he applied the brakes to initiate a right turn onto a taxiway. The pilot added that the right brake "grabbed immediately", causing the airplane to turn clockwise to the left. The pilot also added that the tailwheel was down and in the locked position. The left wing struck the ground and the left landing gear collapsed; the airplane came to a stop on the runway. The reason for the loss of control that caused the collapse could not be determined because an examination of the airplane did not reveal any anomalies that would have precluded normal operation.
- On 15 May 2018, a small Grumman American AA-1B airplane crashed at the airport shortly after taking off. The aircraft experienced an engine problem after departure and attempted to circle back to the airport, but it landed 100 yards short. The reason for the loss of engine power could not be determined because postaccident examination revealed no evidence of mechanical malfunctions or failures that would have precluded normal operation.
- On April 6, 2019, a Van's RV-8 nosed over and veered off the runway into the grass at the Butler County Regional Airport.

== See also ==
- List of airports in Ohio
