= Tylersville, Ohio =

Unincorporated community in Ohio, U.S.

Coordinates: 39°21′27″N 84°25′17″W

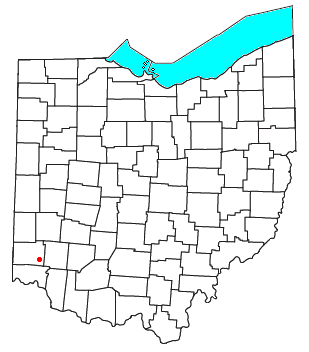
Location of Tylersville, Ohio

Tylersville (also known as Pug Muncy) is an unincorporated community in central West Chester Township, Butler County, Ohio, United States. It was laid out in 1842 by Daniel Pocock and named for the President of the United States at the time, John Tyler. Its name lives on in a major road of northern West Chester Township, which is at Exit 22 on I-75.
