= West Chester Township, Ohio =

Township in Ohio, US

- Township
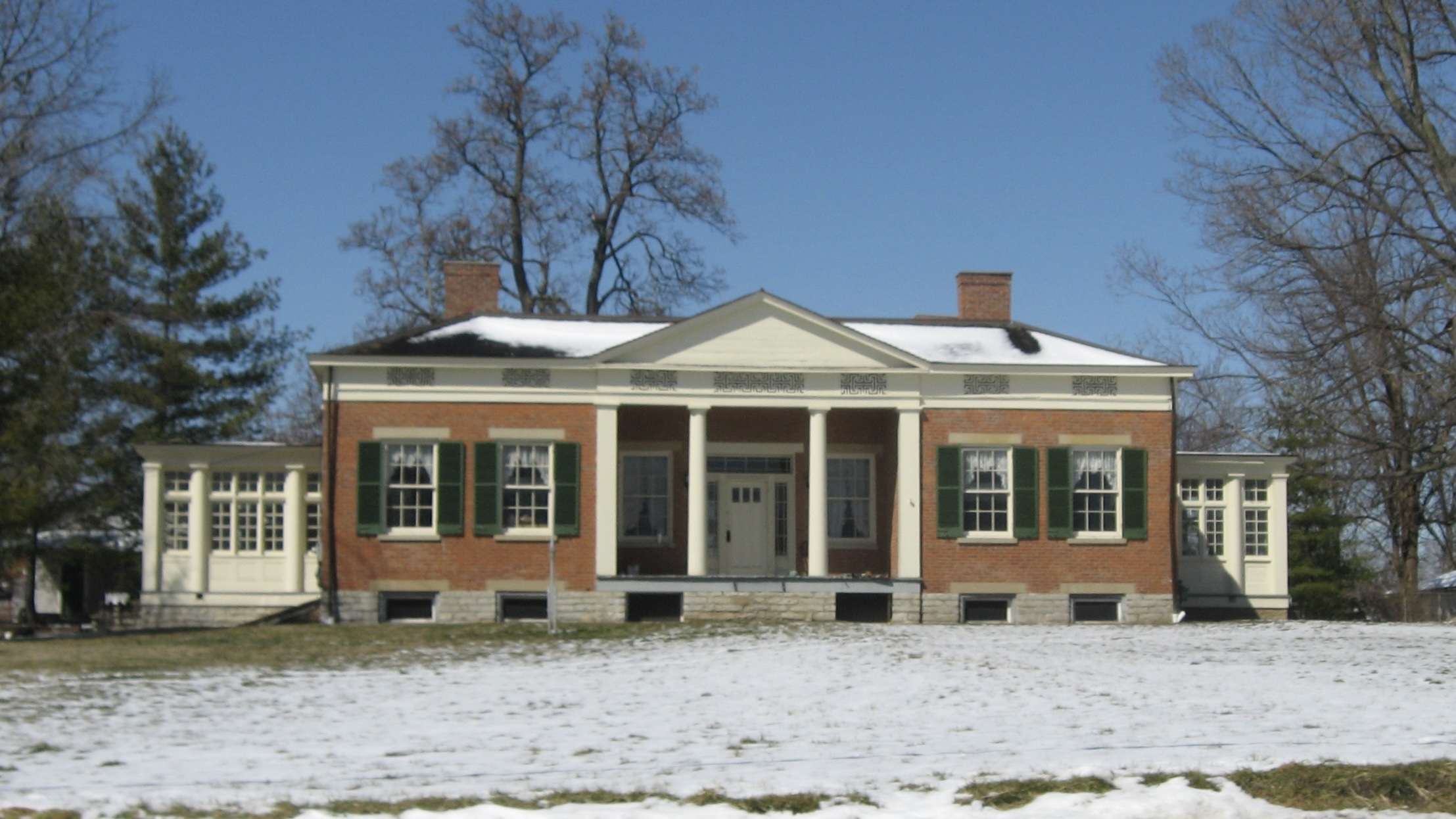
- James D. Conrey House
- Motto: Where Families Grow, and Businesses Prosper...
- Interactive map of West Chester Township, Ohio
- Location within Ohio Location within the United States
- Coordinates: 39°21′10″N 84°21′53″W
- Country: United States
- State: Ohio
- County: Butler

Area
  - Total: 35.615 sq mi (92.24 km^{2})
  - Land: 35.593 sq mi (92.19 km^{2})
  - Water: 0.022 sq mi (0.057 km^{2})

Population (2020)
  - Total: 65,242
  - Density: 1,833.0/sq mi (707.73/km^{2})
- Website: www.westchesteroh.org

West Chester Township (commonly known simply as West Chester) is one of the thirteen townships in Butler County, Ohio, United States. It is the most populous township in Ohio, with a population of 65,242 at the 2020 census. The township is located in the southeastern corner of Butler County, between Sharonville and Liberty Township. West Chester is about 18 miles (29 km) north of Cincinnati and is included in the Cincinnati metropolitan area. Exits 19, 21 and 22 off Interstate 75 serve West Chester.

== History ==
Historical population
Census	Pop.	Note	%±
1850	1,952		—
1900	1,743		—
1910	1,534		−12.0%
1920	1,583		3.2%
1930	1,988		25.6%
1940	2,109		6.1%
1950	2,545		20.7%
1960	6,236		145.0%
1970	12,795		105.2%
1980	23,553		84.1%
1990	37,894		60.9%
2000	54,895		44.9%
2010	60,958		11.0%
2020	64,830		6.4%

Butler County's thirteenth and last township in order of creation, it was created out of Liberty Township by the Butler County Commissioners on June 2, 1823, upon petitions from residents. No boundaries were given in the resolution passed by the commissioners, but it originally contained 35 square miles (91 km^{2}), just short of a full survey township. The new township was given the name "Union." Because Union Township was familiarly known as West Chester, plus the abundance of other townships in Ohio called Union, the name was changed to West Chester Township after being ratified by the township's voters at the primary election on March 7, 2000. The name change took effect on June 28, 2000. Many census and government records, including the 2000 census, refer to it as Union Township. Today, it is the only West Chester Township statewide.

West Chester became the most populous township in Ohio at the 2010 census.

== Climate ==
Climate data for West Chester, Ohio
Month	Jan	Feb	Mar	Apr	May	Jun	Jul	Aug	Sep	Oct	Nov	Dec	Year
Record high °F (°C)	72 (22)	76 (24)	84 (29)	89 (32)	93 (34)	97 (36)	104 (40)	101 (38)	98 (37)	88 (31)	81 (27)	75 (24)	104 (40)
Mean daily maximum °F (°C)	38 (3)	43 (6)	53 (12)	65 (18)	75 (24)	83 (28)	87 (31)	86 (30)	79 (26)	68 (20)	54 (12)	43 (6)	64.5 (18.1)
Mean daily minimum °F (°C)	19 (−7)	21 (−6)	30 (−1)	39 (4)	49 (9)	58 (14)	63 (17)	61 (16)	53 (12)	41 (5)	32 (0)	24 (−4)	40.8 (4.9)
Record low °F (°C)	−25 (−32)	−13 (−25)	−10 (−23)	18 (−8)	27 (−3)	36 (2)	40 (4)	41 (5)	26 (−3)	12 (−11)	−3 (−19)	−22 (−30)	−25 (−32)
Average rainy days	3.18	2.72	3.73	4.10	4.96	4.52	4.04	4.18	3.14	3.09	3.65	3.35	44.66
Source: weather.com

== Geography ==
Located in the southeastern corner of the county, it borders the following townships and cities:

- Liberty Township - north
- Mason - east
- Deerfield Township, Warren County - east
- Sharonville - southeast
- Springdale - southwest
- Fairfield - west
- Fairfield Township - northwest

Part of the southeastern corner of the township has been annexed by the city of Sharonville, but remains in the township. A small portion in the west has been annexed by Fairfield and removed from the township.

The unincorporated communities of Maud, Port Union, Pisgah, and Tylersville are located in central, western, southwestern, and western West Chester Township respectively. The census-designated places of Beckett Ridge and Olde West Chester is located at the township's center, while Wetherington and Four Bridges are located in the northeast.

== Demographics ==
=== 2020 census ===
West Chester Township racial composition
Race	Number	Percentage
White (NH)	44,893	69.2%
Black or African American (NH)	6,133	9.5%
Native American (NH)	304	0.47%
Asian (NH)	5,621	8.6%
Pacific Islander (NH)	78	0.12%
Other/mixed	7,097	10.9%
Hispanic or Latino	5,054	7.8%

== Economy ==
=== Top employers ===
According to West Chester's 2024 Annual Comprehensive Financial Report, the top employers in the township are:

#	Employer	# of Employees
1	GE Aerospace	2,150
2	West Chester Hospital (UC Health)	1,487
3	Cornerstone Group	1,000
4	Resilience	916
5	Tyson Foods (formerly Advance Pierre)	901
6	SanMar Corporation	700
7	CenterWell Pharmacy	531
8	TREW Automation	430
9	Procter & Gamble	409
10	CTL Aerospace	400

=== Household income ===
Year	Average	Median
2020	$121,695	$97,107

== Government ==
The township is governed by a three-member board of trustees, Mark Welch, Lee Wong, and Ann Becker, who are elected in November of odd-numbered years to a four-year term beginning on the following January 1. Two are elected in the year after the presidential election and one is elected in the year before it. There is also an elected township fiscal officer, who serves a four-year term beginning on April 1 of the year after the election, which is held in November of the year before the presidential election. Vacancies in the fiscal officership or on the board of trustees are filled by the remaining trustees. Historically, West Chester Township has leaned toward the Republican Party but in recent years that advantage has narrowed. Barack Obama only won 35.2% of the vote against John McCain's 63.5% in 2008, but in 2020 Joe Biden claimed 44% against Donald Trump's 54.5%. West Chester Township is entirely in Ohio's 8th congressional district.

Three times voters have rejected the incorporation of the township as a city. On February 2, 1988, the vote was 4,097 to 3,956 against incorporation; 5,816 to 4,972 against on August 8, 1989, and 5,054 to 4,679 against on August 3, 1993.

== Public services ==
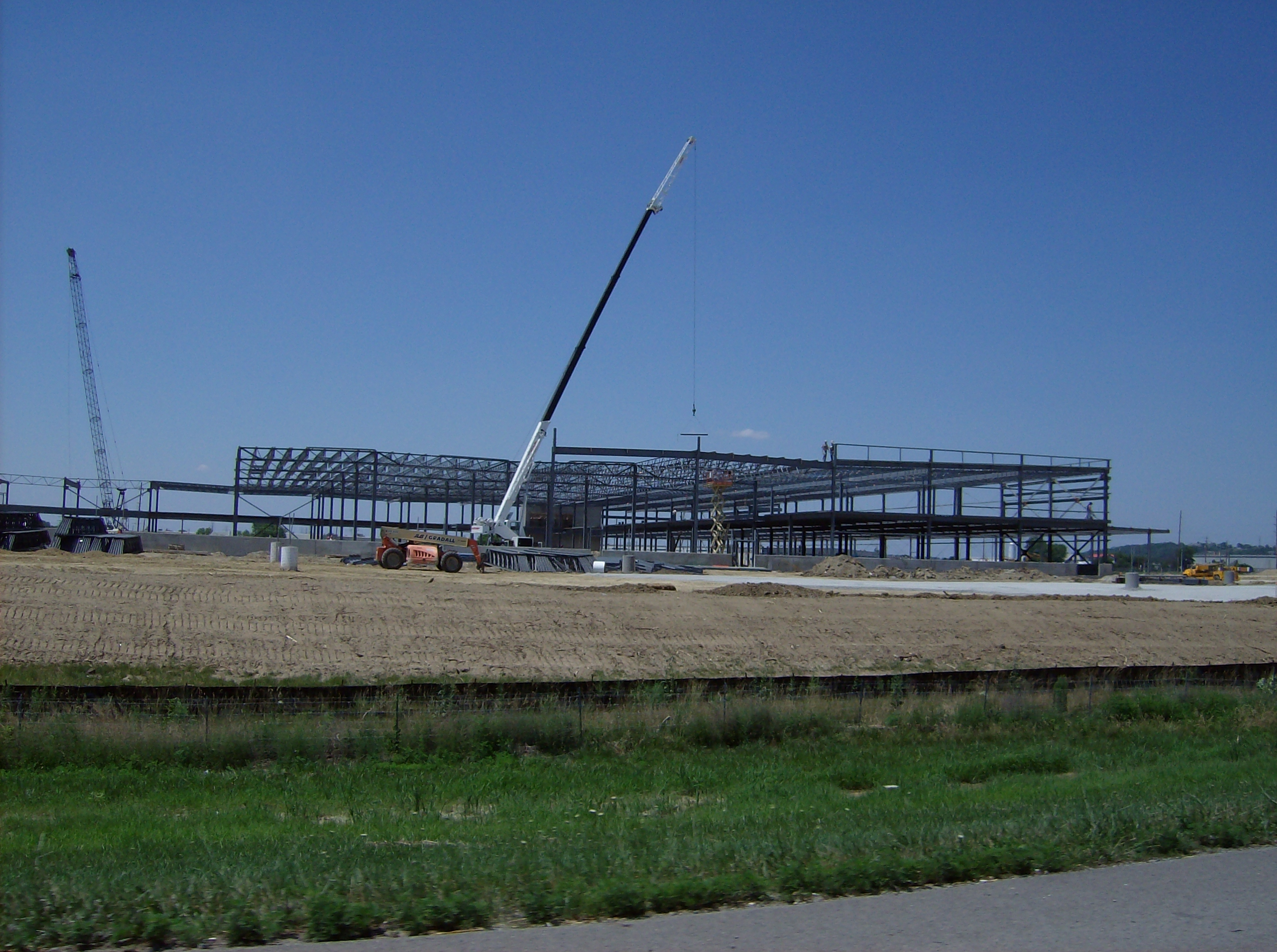
In recent years, the population of West Chester Township has grown rapidly, leading to extensive construction throughout the township.

Formed in 1967, the township police department employs approximately 100 individuals. Led by Police Chief Joel Herzog, it is organized into three distinct bureaus: the Patrol Bureau, the Support Bureau, and the Administration Bureau.

The township was home to the Voice of America's Bethany Relay Station, a facility covering 625 acres (2.5 km^{2}) in the northeast corner of the township that broadcast American propaganda overseas from 1943 to 1994. The property owned by the Voice of America Station has now been converted into Voice of America MetroPark. This park consists of a 1.42-mile walking trail around a lake. The Miami University Voice of America Learning Center was opened in 2009. The township is home to several parks in addition to Voice of America MetroPark, including Keehner Park. The township is also home to the Islamic Center of Greater Cincinnati, which is one of the largest mosques in the area.

In 2006 ground was broken for The Square at Union Centre which serves as the town square for West Chester hosting events surrounded by class A office space and restaurants. The West Chester library is part of the square and a bell-tower constructed by the famous and historic Verdin Bell Company of Cincinnati serves as the centerpiece to the square.

Some of the township is in the West Chester post office (45069) and the southeastern corner is served by the Sharonville office (45241). Fairfield (45014) and Hamilton (45011 or 45015) also serve the township.

== Education ==
Most of the township is in the Lakota Local School District, but portions are also in the Princeton City School District and a tiny part on the eastern border is in the Mason City School District. The Township's two high school main campuses, Lakota East and Lakota West, are identical buildings that were built in 1997. As of 2022, the Lakota West High School Main Campus has 2,740 students. As of 2024, the principal at Lakota West High School is Scott Laman. Lakota West is classified by OHSAA as a Division 1 school. Lakota West High School is home to the 2007 Ohio State Baseball Champions, led by Coach Bill Dreisbach.

== Notable people ==
- John Boehner, 61st Speaker of the United States House of Representatives
- Fr. Anthony Cekada, sedevacantist Catholic priest and author
- Bill Coley, former Ohio Senator
- John Conner, former fullback for the New York Giants
- Bp. Daniel Dolan, Sedevacantist bishop
- Rich Franklin, mixed martial arts fighter
- Andre Frazier, former linebacker for the Pittsburgh Steelers and Cincinnati Bengals
- Ken Griffey Sr., former baseball player for the Cincinnati Reds
- Ken Griffey Jr., Hall of Fame baseball player for the Seattle Mariners and the Cincinnati Reds
- Jorge Gurgel, mixed martial arts fighter
- Nick Hagglund, defender for FC Cincinnati in the MLS
- Jordan Hicks, former linebacker for the Eagles, Cardinals, Vikings and Browns
- Ryan Kelly, former center for the Indianapolis Colts and the Minnesota Vikings
- Brent Kolatalo, American mixer, record producer, engineer, and songwriter
- Elizabeth "Liz" McMahon (born 1993), American volleyball player
- E.W. Scripps, newspaper publisher
