= Miltonville, Ohio =

Unincorporated community in Ohio, U.S.

Coordinates: 39°30′03″N 84°27′39″W

Miltonville is an unincorporated community in northern Madison Township, Butler County, Ohio, United States. It is about 1.4 miles (2.3 km) north of Trenton, near the intersection of Elk Creek and Howe Roads. It was founded in 1816 and named after poet John Milton.
