= Keehner Park =

Park in Butler County, Ohio, United States

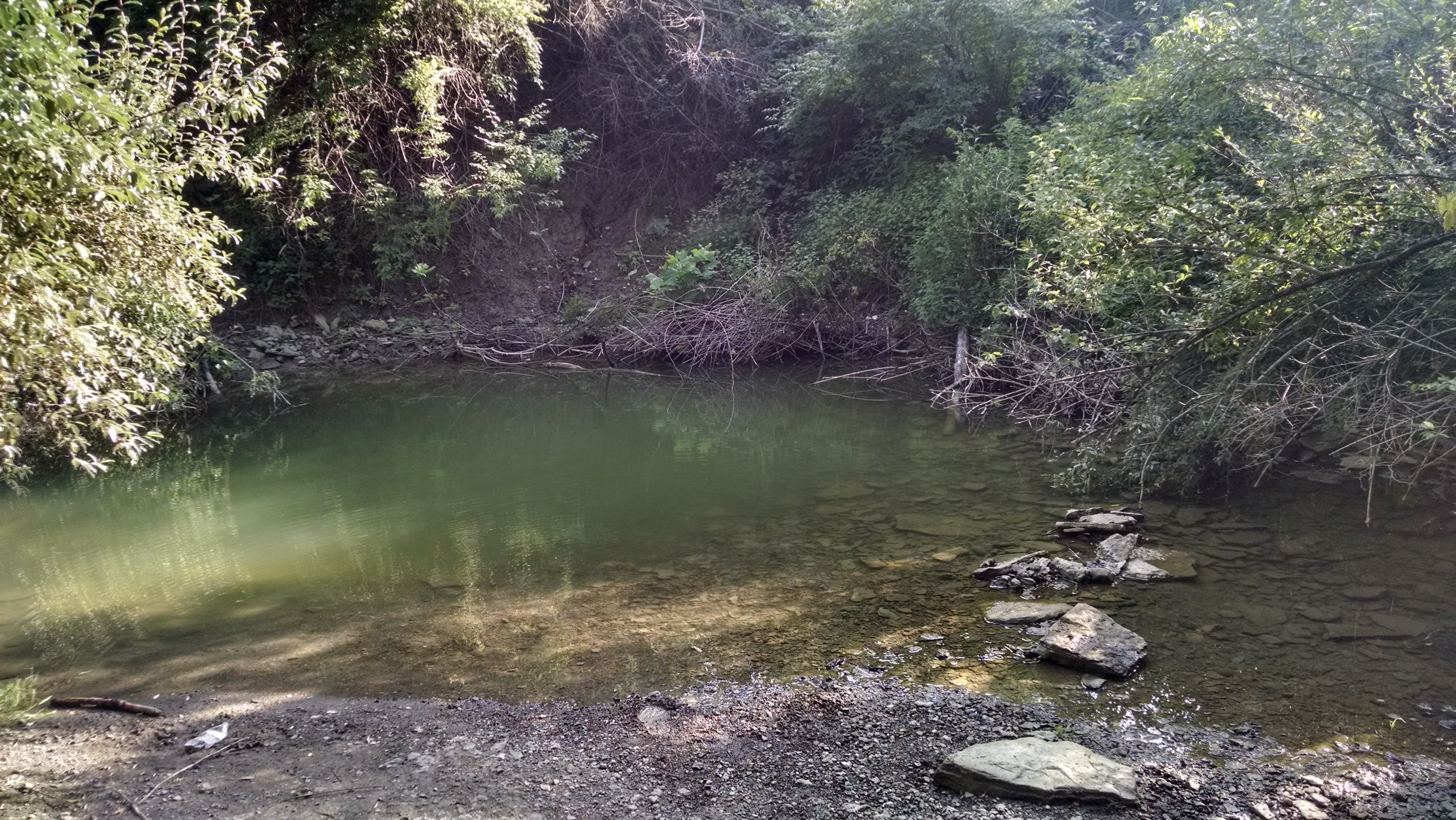
- A swimming hole on the eastern fork of Mill Creek, which runs through the park

- Location within the United States
- Location: West Chester, Ohio
- Coordinates: 39°20′13″N 84°22′50″W
- Area: 123 acres (0.192 sq mi; 50 ha; 0.50 km^{2})
- Established: 1976
- Open: Dawn to dusk

Keehner Park is a public park located in West Chester, Ohio. The park is locally known as a location for various community events, such as free concerts and outdoor performances. The park offers playgrounds, picnic shelters, athletic and sport areas including baseball diamonds, soccer fields, and tennis courts, walking and mountain biking trails, and additional utilities such as restrooms and public waste disposal dumpsters.

== History ==
Voter approval to use funding from the Ohio Department of Natural Resources resulted in the creation of Keehner park in 1976. The park is named after a local farming family that existed in the early days of West Chester. Keehner Park is the current home of a reconstructed 1833 log cabin, relocated to the park from Preble County in 1990.

== Park Events ==
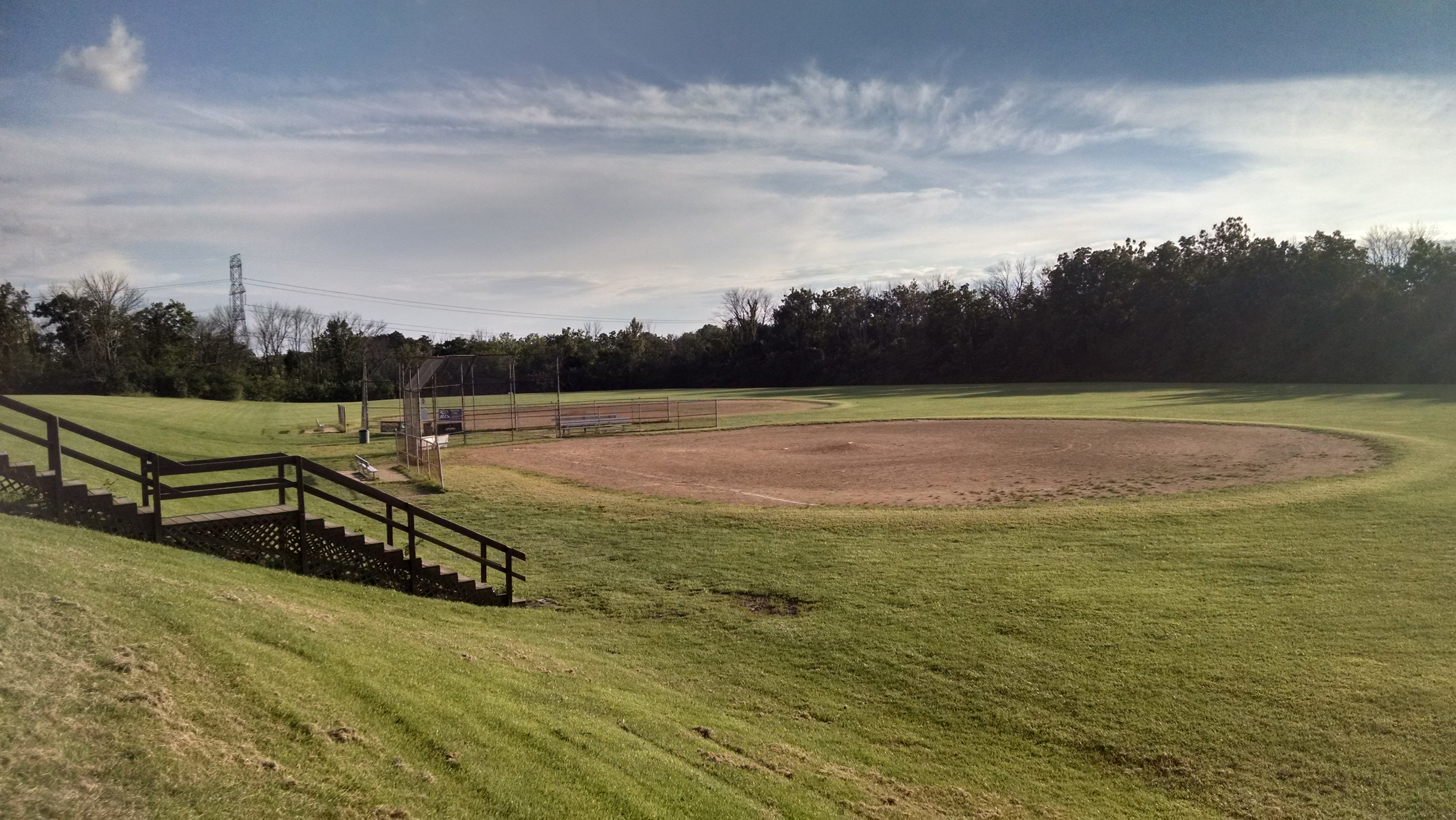
Baseball diamonds in the park

Keehner Park frequently serves as host to a variety of community events. One of the more well known events is the West Chester Concert Series. Sponsored by Fifth Third, the event occurs each Saturday in the park's amphitheater, featuring performances by a variety of local music groups. Historically the park has hosted nature education programs; stargazing; Easter egg hunts; Halloween events with wagon rides, petting zoos, haunted trails, costume contests, and other autumn themed attractions; seasonal decorations of the log cabin; and other annual events.

The park frequently hosts sporting events and provides access to baseball diamonds, soccer fields, basketball courts (3 point distance: 22'9 ft and 23'9 ft), and tennis courts.

== Gallery ==
Keehner Park
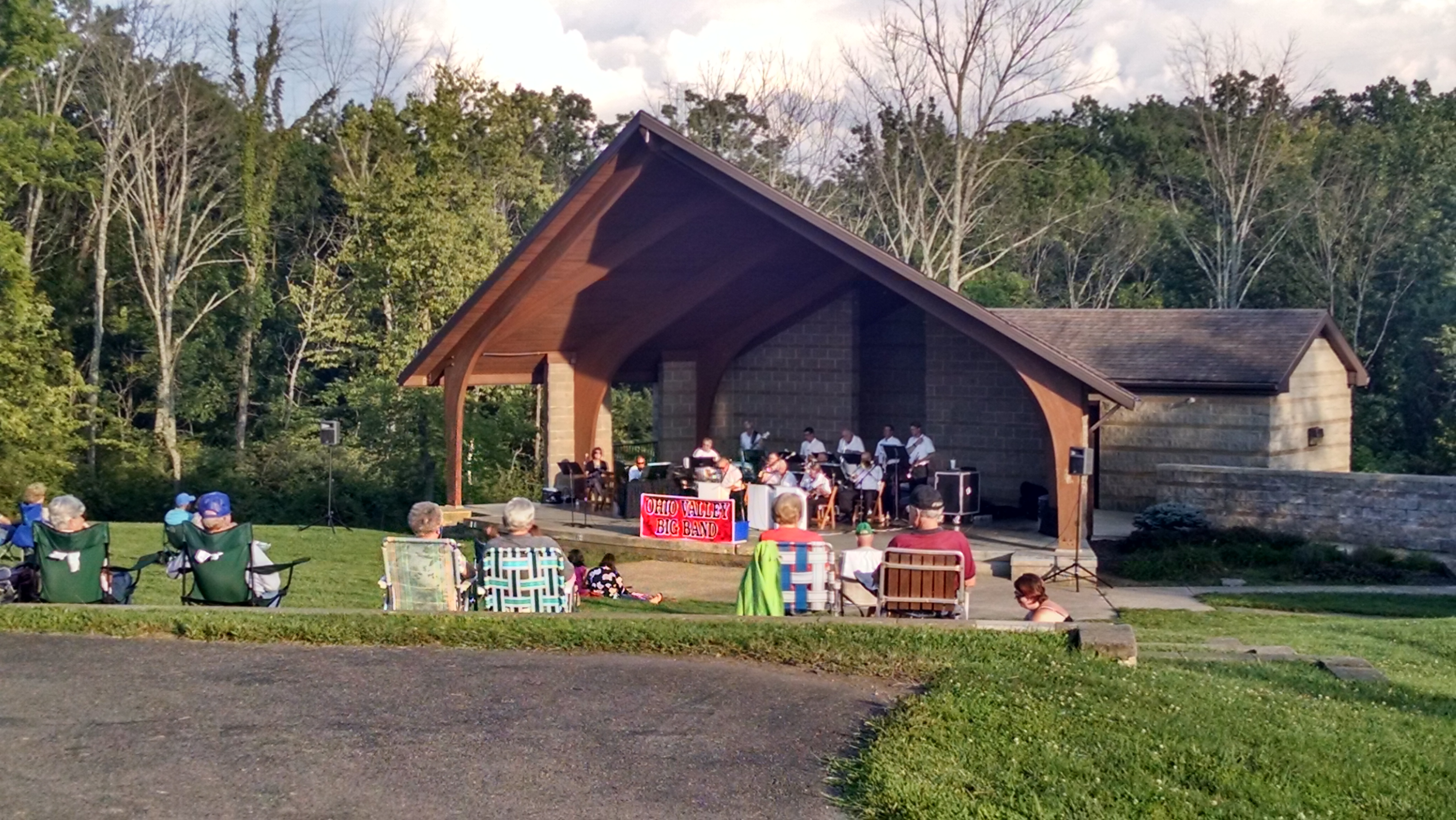
Concert at the park's amphitheater

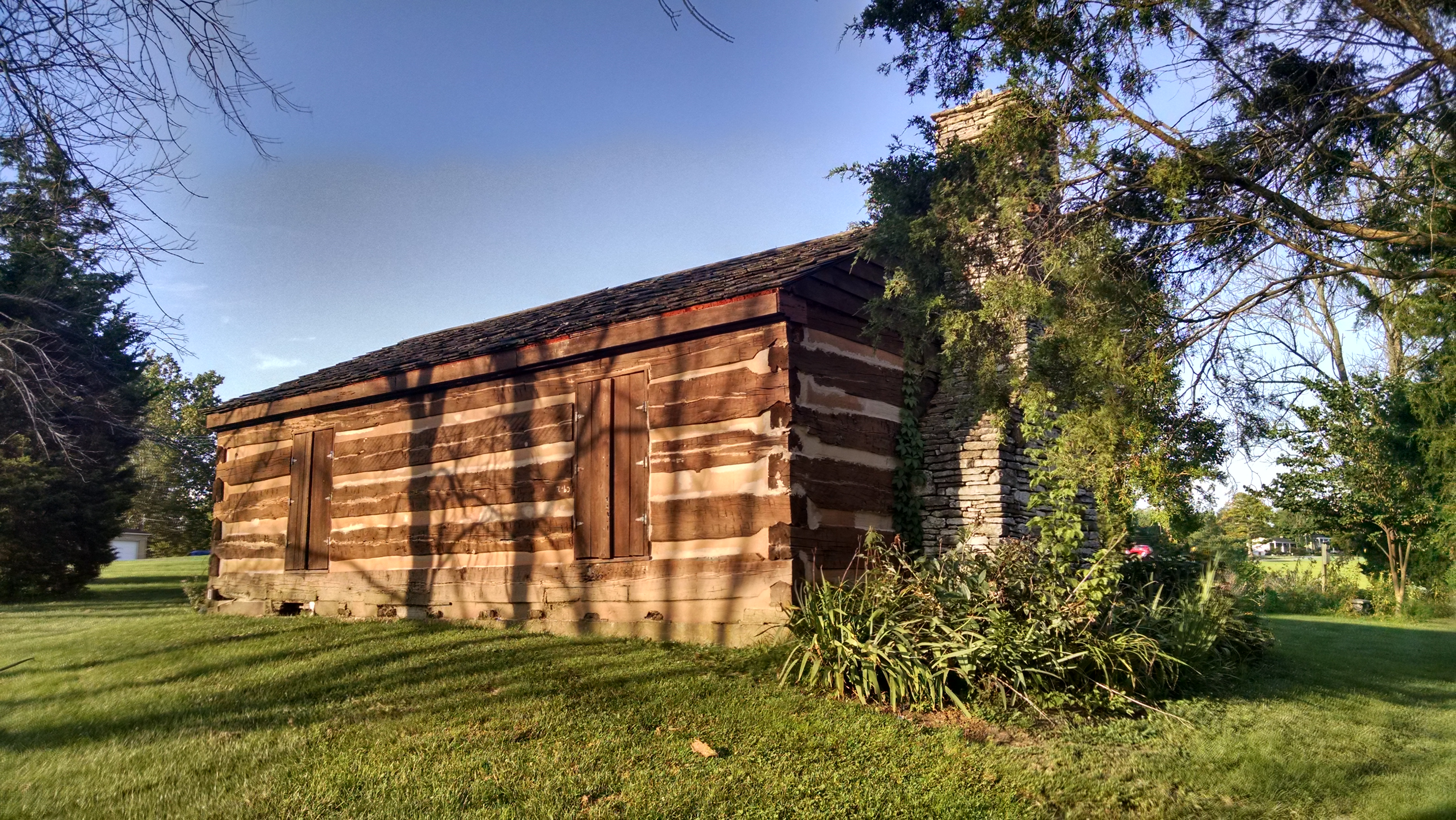
"The Cabin in the Clearing"

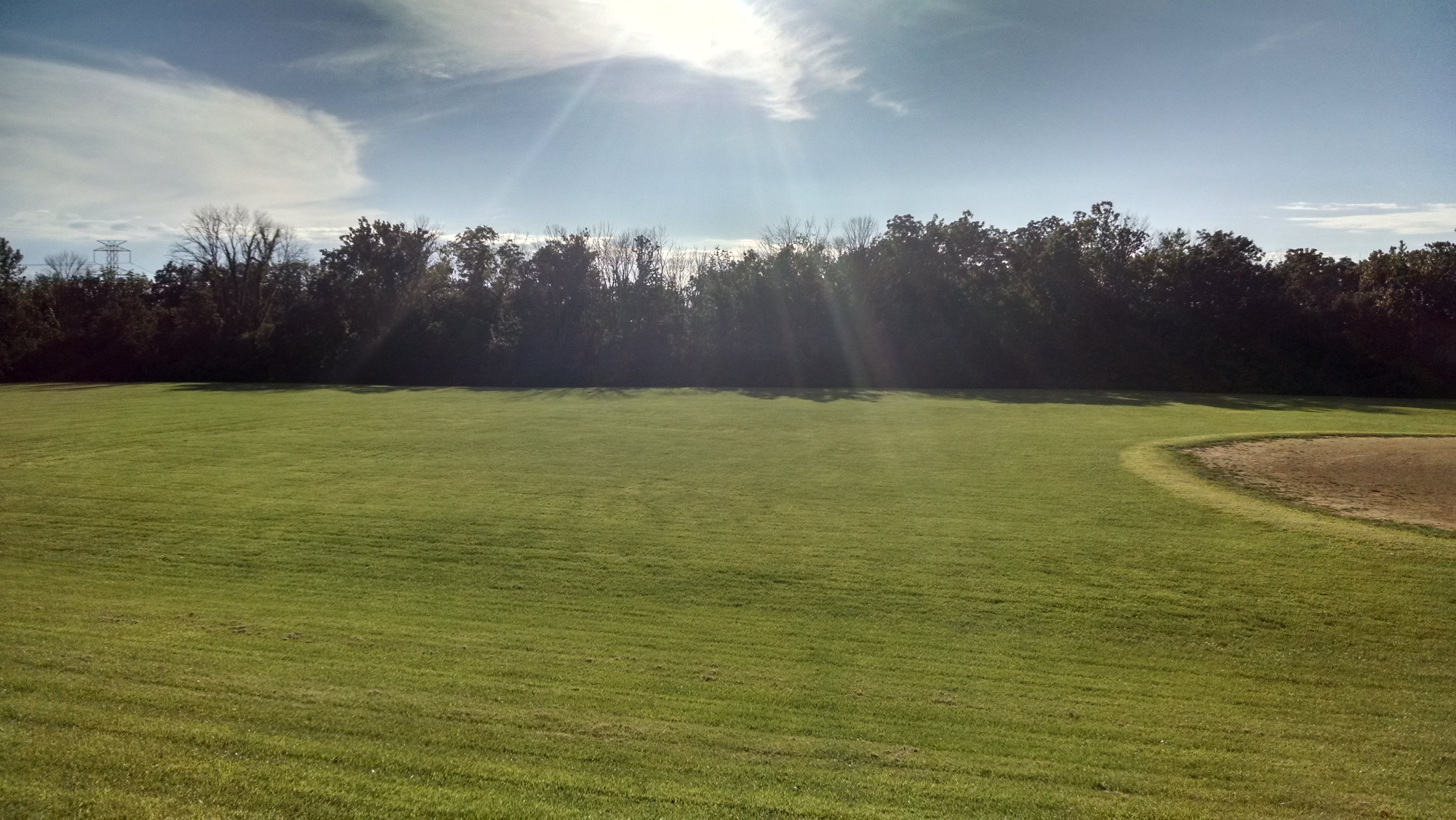
A grass field, maintained for athletic use

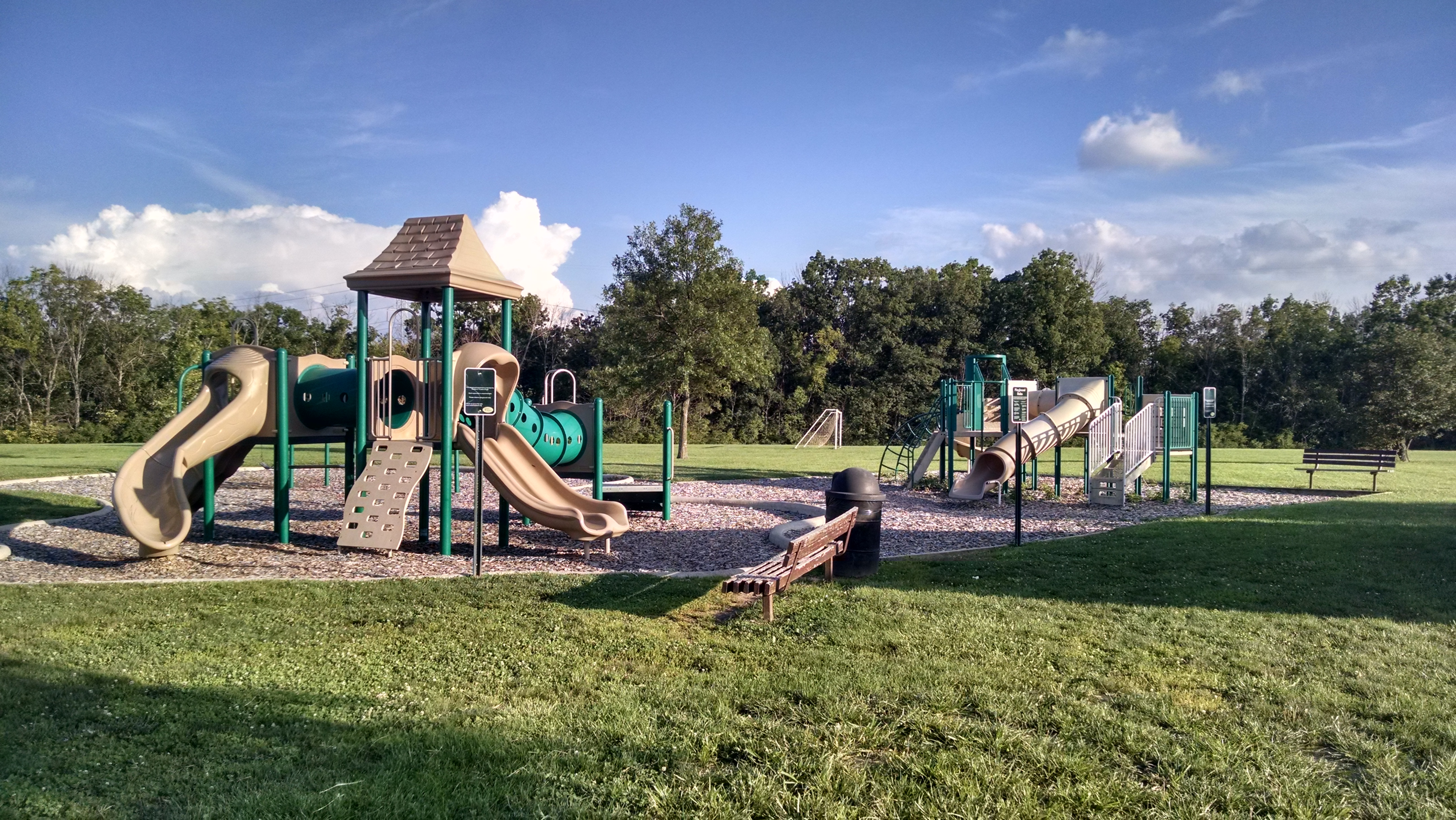
Playground in the eastern half of the park

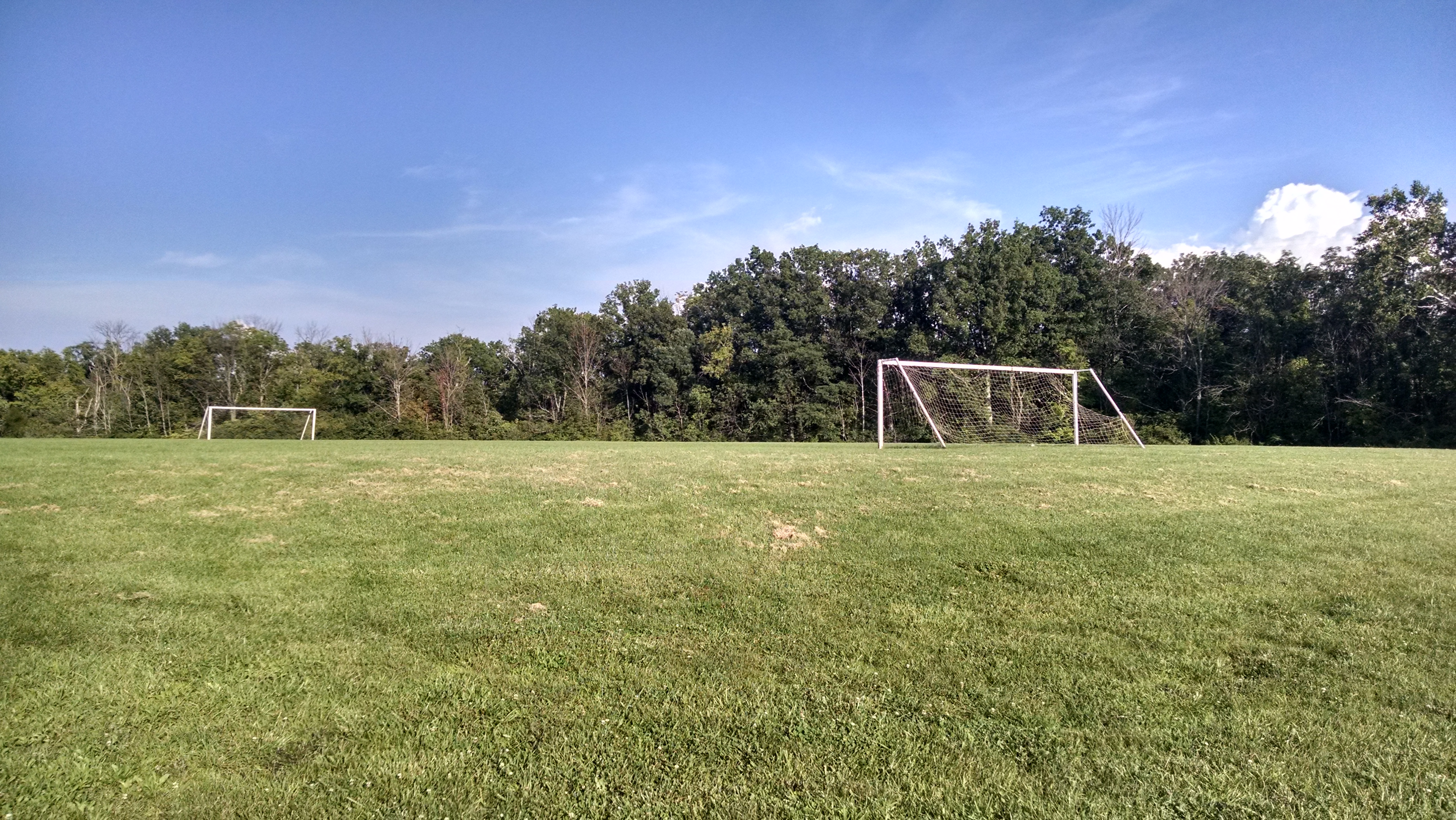
Soccer fields
