= Lemon Township, Butler County, Ohio =

Township in Ohio, US

- Township
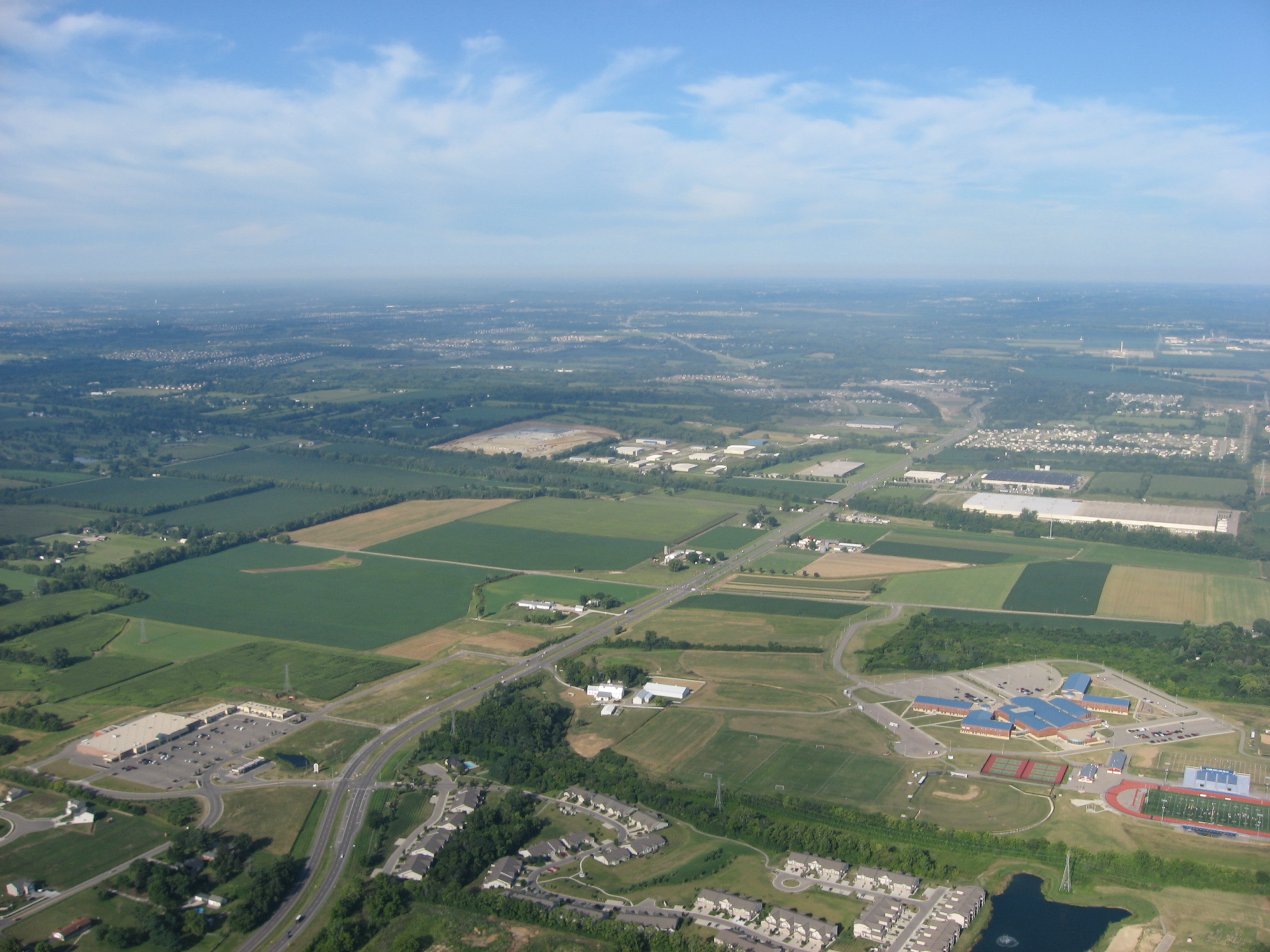
- Countryside in Lemon Township

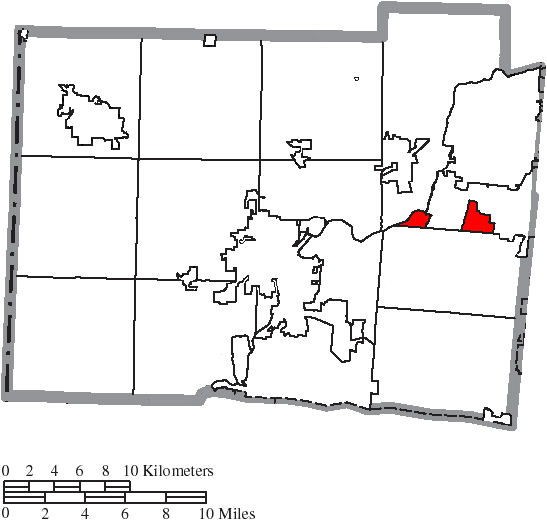
- Location of Lemon Township in Butler County
- Coordinates: 39°27′17″N 84°23′34″W
- Country: United States
- State: Ohio
- County: Butler

Area
  - Total: 15.3 sq mi (39.7 km^{2})
  - Land: 15.0 sq mi (38.8 km^{2})
  - Water: 0.39 sq mi (1.0 km^{2})
- Elevation: 650 ft (198 m)

Population (2020)
  - Total: 16,885
  - Density: 930/sq mi (358/km^{2})
- Time zone: UTC-5 (Eastern (EST))
  - Summer (DST): UTC-4 (EDT)
- FIPS code: 39-42672
- GNIS feature ID: 1085811
- Website: https://www.lemon-township.org/

Lemon Township is one of thirteen townships in Butler County, Ohio, United States. Located in the northeastern part of the county, it includes most of the city of Monroe. It had a population of 16,885 at the 2020 census. It is the only Lemon Township statewide.

== History ==
The township as originally created was approximately 36 square miles (93 km^{2}) and included all of the Butler County portions of what is Middletown and most of the Butler County part of Monroe, the remainder being in Liberty Township. The southern part of the township was within the limits of the Symmes Purchase, the northern boundary today being marked by Todhunter Road, 2.25 miles (3.62 km) north of the southern boundary. It was bounded on the east by the Warren County line and on the west and north by the Great Miami River.

The original boundaries included all of what is now Madison Township, Madison being divided from Lemon on May 7, 1810.

== Geography ==
Located in the eastern part of the county, it borders the following townships and city:

- Middletown - north
- Turtlecreek Township, Warren County - east
- Liberty Township - south
- Madison Township - west

The Miami and Erie Canal passed through the township, parallelling the eastern shore of the Great Miami and linking Hamilton to Middletown. Remains of the canal, including the lock at Excello, are preserved as parks in the township. The Norfolk Southern Railway has a main line through the center of the township. Major roads include Interstate 75 (crossing the southeast corner of the township) and State Routes 4, 63, and 73. The old Dixie Highway, later U.S. Route 25, passed through the township and is now an unnumbered road sharing the name of Main Street through the center of Monroe. The community of Excello lies in the central part of the township, and the community of Blue Ball was on the Dixie Highway where it crossed the Warren County line.

== Government ==
The township is governed by a three-member board of trustees, who are elected in November of odd-numbered years to a four-year term beginning on the following January 1. Two are elected in the year after the presidential election and one is elected in the year before it. There is also an elected township fiscal officer, who serves a four-year term beginning on April 1 of the year after the election, which is held in November of the year before the presidential election. Vacancies in the fiscal officership or on the board of trustees are filled by the remaining trustees.
