= Beckett Ridge, Ohio =

- Census-designated place
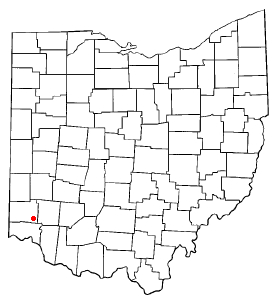
- Location of Beckett Ridge, Ohio
- Coordinates: 39°20′41″N 84°26′17″W
- Country: United States
- State: Ohio
- County: Butler
- Township: West Chester

Area
  - Total: 4.80 sq mi (12.44 km^{2})
  - Land: 4.80 sq mi (12.44 km^{2})
  - Water: 0 sq mi (0.00 km^{2})
- Elevation: 804 ft (245 m)

Population (2020)
  - Total: 9,192
  - Density: 1,914.4/sq mi (739.14/km^{2})
- Time zone: UTC-5 (Eastern (EST))
  - Summer (DST): UTC-4 (EDT)
- ZIP code: 45069
- Area codes: 283 and 513
- FIPS code: 39-04840
- GNIS feature ID: 2393331

Beckett Ridge is a census-designated place (CDP) in West Chester Township, Butler County, Ohio, United States. The population was 9,192 at the 2020 census.

== History ==
Beckett Ridge began as a planned community in the 1970s. Beckett Ridge occupies an area once operated as a farm by the Beckett family. Beckett Ridge was developed by Gary L. Schottenstein, chairman and CEO of Schottenstein Real Estate Group. It was the largest planned unit development in Ohio at the time.

== Geography ==
Beckett Ridge is located in southeastern Butler County, in the west-central part of West Chester Township. It is centered on the Beckett Ridge Golf Club, occupying high ground to the north of the valley of Mill Creek.

Interstate 75 cuts across the southeast corner of the CDP, with the closest access from Exit 19 (Union Centre Boulevard). State Route 747 forms the western edge of the CDP, leading south into Glendale and north towards Middletown.

According to the United States Census Bureau, the CDP has a total area of 4.8 square miles (12.4 km^{2}), all land.

== Demographics ==
Historical population
Census	Pop.	Note	%±
2020	9,192		—
U.S. Decennial Census

As of the census of 2000, there were 8,663 people, 3,107 households, and 2,420 families residing in the CDP. The population density was 1,780.9 people per square mile (687.6 people/km^{2}). There were 3,222 housing units at an average density of 662.4 per square mile (255.8/km^{2}). The racial makeup of the CDP was 88.27% White, 4.83% African American, 0.18% Native American, 5.53% Asian, 0.01% Pacific Islander, 0.28% from other races, and 0.90% from two or more races. Hispanic or Latino of any race were 1.63% of the population.

There were 3,107 households, out of which 43.8% had children under the age of 18 living with them, 69.2% were married couples living together, 6.5% had a female householder with no husband present, and 22.1% were non-families. 17.8% of all households were made up of individuals, and 3.3% had someone living alone who was 65 years of age or older. The average household size was 2.79 and the average family size was 3.21.

In the CDP, the population was spread out, with 30.4% under the age of 18, 5.9% from 18 to 24, 34.6% from 25 to 44, 23.9% from 45 to 64, and 5.2% who were 65 years of age or older. The median age was 35 years. For every 100 females, there were 99.0 males. For every 100 females age 18 and over, there were 96.3 males.

The median income for a household in the CDP was $80,090, and the median income for a family was $90,758. Males had a median income of $61,008 versus $38,933 for females. The per capita income for the CDP was $33,835. About 1.3% of families and 1.5% of the population were below the poverty line, including 2.2% of those under age 18 and none of those age 65 or over.
