= Pisgah, Ohio =

Pisgah Pisgah of West Chester
- Community
- Location within Ohio Location within the United States
- Coordinates: 39°19′06″N 84°22′08″W
- Country: United States
- State: Ohio
- County: Butler

Population (2010)
  - Demonym: Pisgian
- Time zone: UTC-5 (EST)
  - Summer (DST): UTC-4 (EDT)
- ZIP codes: Zip codes: 45241,45069
- Area code: 513
- FIPS code: 39-15000
- GNIS feature ID: 1066650

Pisgah is an unincorporated community in Butler County, in the U.S. state of Ohio.

== History ==
A post office called Pisgah was established in 1843, and remained in operation until 1905. The community was named for a hilltop church near the original town site, Pisgah meaning "peak" in Hebrew.
