= Butler County, Ohio =

County in Ohio, United States

- County
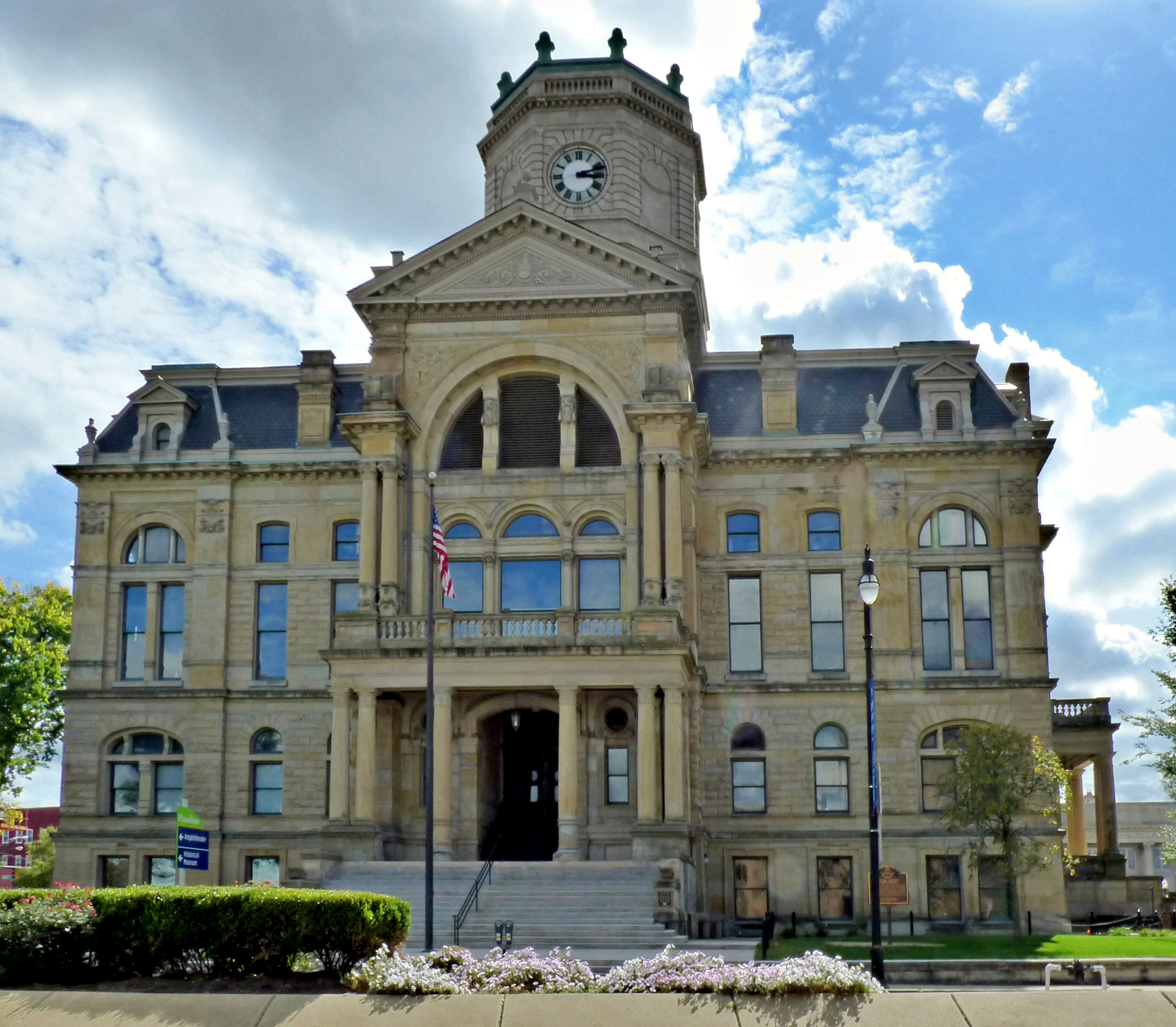
- Butler County Courthouse

- Flag Seal

- Location within the U.S. state of Ohio
- Coordinates: 39°26′N 84°35′W
- Country: United States
- State: Ohio
- Founded: May 1, 1803
- Named for: General Richard Butler
- Seat: Hamilton
- Largest city: Hamilton

Area
  - Total: 470 sq mi (1,200 km^{2})
  - Land: 467 sq mi (1,210 km^{2})
  - Water: 3.1 sq mi (8.0 km^{2}) 0.7%

Population (2020)
  - Total: 390,357
  - Estimate (2025): 400,128 ▲
  - Density: 836/sq mi (323/km^{2})
- Time zone: UTC−5 (Eastern)
  - Summer (DST): UTC−4 (EDT)
- Congressional district: 8th
- Website: bcohio.gov

Butler County is a county located in the southwestern part of the U.S. state of Ohio. As of the 2020 census, the population was 390,357, making it the seventh-most populous county in Ohio. Its county seat and most populous city is Hamilton. It is named for General Richard Butler, who died in 1791 during St. Clair's defeat. Located along the Great Miami River, it is also home to Miami University, a public university founded in 1809. Butler County is part of the Cincinnati, OH–KY–IN Metropolitan Statistical Area.

== History ==
Successive cultures of ancient Indigenous peoples of the Americas occupied areas of the county. They built large earthworks, seven of which were still standing and recorded by a Smithsonian survey.

Early French explorers likely passed through the area along the Miami River. The gravesites of David and Margaret Gregory indicate they were some of the first white settlers in the area, in Liberty Township. White settlers began moving into the area in larger numbers after the 1795 Treaty of Greenville was signed with the Native Americans of the area. The current area was split about evenly between the Symmes Purchase and the Congress Lands West of Miami River.

Butler County was formed on March 24, 1803, from portions of Hamilton County. It is named for General Richard Butler, who served in the American Revolutionary War and Northwest Indian War. Between 1803 and 1823, the townships of the county became officially recognized. Large portions of the county were held by non-resident owners, including 640 acres owned by major general and future U.S. president William Henry Harrison. Butler County's original size was 480 square miles (1,200 km^{2}); some land that was originally part of Butler County was reassigned to Warren County in the north and Hamilton County in the south.

In 1803, the United States Congress granted one township to the Ohio General Assembly in the region to build a college. The legislature selected a township off Four Mile Creek, the College Township, and chartered Miami University in 1809.

Around the late 1860s or early 1870s, the community of Maud was the sight of an attempt by a local entrepreneur to construct a mill that worked via perpetual motion. A large crowd gathered to watch the mill start, and when it did not, laughter ensued. Nothing was heard from the unnamed entrepreneur again, and the mill quickly vanished. The local newspapers did not record the event, and the only record of its occurrence was transmitted by elderly residents of Maud to William Marion Miller of Miami University.

The Great Flood of 1913 affected much of the county, particularly Middletown, where approximately 25% of the town was flooded and 6 people died, and Hamilton, where 46% of the city was flooded, over 300 buildings destroyed, and at least 98 people killed.

In the 1920s, Butler, Pickaway and Washington counties were central areas of the rural membership of the Ku Klux Klan in Ohio.

In 1957, the Ohio Legislature established Hueston Woods State Park, which covers 3,596 acres in Butler and neighboring Preble County. In addition to a 625-acre manmade lake, the park contains the 200-acre Hueston Woods, one of the last near-virgin growths of American beech and maple in Ohio.

== Geography ==
According to the United States Census Bureau, the county has a total area of 470 square miles (1,200 km^{2}), of which 467 square miles (1,210 km^{2}) is land and 3.1 square miles (8.0 km^{2}) (0.7%) is water.

The majority of Butler County consists of the river valleys of the Great and Little Miami Rivers. The valley was originally carved by glaciation.

The soil at highest uplands is frequently heavy in clay, moving downhill to a sandy loam, while in the valleys the soil is black with river deposits.

Before deforestation by settlers, much of the area was forests of American beech and maple trees.

=== Adjacent counties ===
- Preble County (north)
- Montgomery County (northeast)
- Warren County (east)
- Hamilton County (south)
- Dearborn County, Indiana (southwest)
- Franklin County, Indiana (west)
- Union County, Indiana (northwest)

== Demographics ==
Historical population
Census	Pop.	Note	%±
1810	11,150		—
1820	21,746		95.0%
1830	27,142		24.8%
1840	28,173		3.8%
1850	30,789		9.3%
1860	35,840		16.4%
1870	39,912		11.4%
1880	42,579		6.7%
1890	48,597		14.1%
1900	56,870		17.0%
1910	70,271		23.6%
1920	87,025		23.8%
1930	114,084		31.1%
1940	120,249		5.4%
1950	147,203		22.4%
1960	199,076		35.2%
1970	226,207		13.6%
1980	258,787		14.4%
1990	291,479		12.6%
2000	332,807		14.2%
2010	368,130		10.6%
2020	390,357		6.0%
2025 (est.)	400,128	▲	2.5%
U.S. Decennial Census; 1790–1960 1900–1990; 1990–2000 2010–2020

=== 2020 census ===
As of the 2020 census, the county had a population of 390,357, and the median age was 37.4 years. 23.4% of residents were under the age of 18 and 15.4% of residents were 65 years of age or older. For every 100 females there were 97.0 males, and for every 100 females age 18 and over there were 94.8 males age 18 and over.

The racial makeup of the county was 76.6% White, 8.9% Black or African American, 0.4% American Indian and Alaska Native, 4.0% Asian, 0.1% Native Hawaiian and Pacific Islander, 3.5% from some other race, and 6.5% from two or more races. Hispanic or Latino residents of any race comprised 6.5% of the population.

90.4% of residents lived in urban areas, while 9.6% lived in rural areas.

There were 145,159 households in the county, of which 32.3% had children under the age of 18 living in them. Of all households, 49.3% were married-couple households, 17.9% were households with a male householder and no spouse or partner present, and 25.5% were households with a female householder and no spouse or partner present. About 25.1% of all households were made up of individuals and 10.0% had someone living alone who was 65 years of age or older.

There were 153,741 housing units, of which 5.6% were vacant. Among occupied housing units, 67.4% were owner-occupied and 32.6% were renter-occupied. The homeowner vacancy rate was 1.2% and the rental vacancy rate was 6.6%.

=== Racial and ethnic composition ===
Butler County, Ohio – Racial and ethnic composition Note: the US Census treats Hispanic/Latino as an ethnic category. This table excludes Latinos from the racial categories and assigns them to a separate category. Hispanics/Latinos may be of any race.
Race / ethnicity (NH = Non-Hispanic)	Pop 1980	Pop 1990	Pop 2000	Pop 2010	Pop 2020	% 1980	% 1990	% 2000	% 2010	% 2020
White alone (NH)	243,799	273,854	301,078	310,183	294,712	94.21%	93.95%	90.47%	84.26%	75.50%
Black or African American alone (NH)	11,972	13,069	17,398	26,463	34,144	4.63%	4.48%	5.23%	7.19%	8.75%
Native American or Alaska Native alone (NH)	257	363	645	606	610	0.10%	0.12%	0.19%	0.16%	0.16%
Asian alone (NH)	1,051	2,611	5,120	8,759	15,658	0.41%	0.90%	1.54%	2.38%	4.01%
Native Hawaiian or Pacific Islander alone (NH)	x	x	77	239	480	x	x	0.02%	0.06%	0.12%
Other race alone (NH)	211	115	340	516	1,546	0.08%	0.04%	0.10%	0.14%	0.40%
Mixed race or Multiracial (NH)	x	x	3,378	6,694	17,942	x	x	1.02%	1.82%	4.60%
Hispanic or Latino (any race)	1,497	1,467	4,771	14,670	25,265	0.58%	0.50%	1.43%	3.99%	6.47%
Total	258,787	291,479	332,807	368,130	390,357	100.00%	100.00%	100.00%	100.00%	100.00%

=== 2010 census ===
As of the census of 2010, there were 368,130 people, 135,960 households, and 95,404 families residing in the county. The population density was 788.2 inhabitants per square mile (304.3/km^{2}). There were 148,273 housing units at an average density of 317.5 per square mile (122.6/km^{2}). The racial makeup of the county was 86.0% white, 7.3% black or African American, 2.4% Asian, 0.2% American Indian, 0.1% Pacific islander, 1.8% from other races, and 2.1% from two or more races. Those of Hispanic or Latino origin made up 4.0% of the population. In terms of ancestry, 27.0% were German, 14.8% were American, 13.6% were Irish, and 9.7% were English.

Of the 135,960 households, 35.9% had children under the age of 18 living with them, 52.9% were married couples living together, 12.4% had a female householder with no husband present, 29.8% were non-families, and 23.5% of all households were made up of individuals. The average household size was 2.63 and the average family size was 3.10. The median age was 36.0 years.

The median income for a household in the county was $54,788 and the median income for a family was $68,539. Males had a median income of $50,499 versus $37,094 for females. The per capita income for the county was $25,892. About 8.3% of families and 12.8% of the population were below the poverty line, including 16.1% of those under age 18 and 6.8% of those age 65 or over.

=== 2000 census ===
As of the census of 2000, there were 332,807 people, 123,082 households, and 87,880 families residing in the county. The population density was 712 inhabitants per square mile (275/km^{2}). There were 129,793 housing units at an average density of 278 per square mile (107/km^{2}). The racial makeup of the county was 91.20% White, 5.27% Black or African American, 0.21% Native American, 1.55% Asian, 0.03% Pacific Islander, 0.62% from other races, and 1.13% from two or more races. 1.43% of the population were Hispanic or Latino of any race. 28.1% were of German, 16.7% American, 10.7% Irish, and 9.8% English ancestry according to Census 2000. Those citing "American" ancestry in Butler County are of overwhelmingly English extraction, most English Americans identify simply as American because their ancestors have been in North America for centuries—in some cases since the 1600s.

There were 123,082 households, out of which 35.50% had children under the age of 18 living with them, 57.00% were married couples living together, 10.70% had a female householder with no husband present, and 28.60% were non-families. 22.70% of all households were made up of individuals, and 7.60% had someone living alone who was 65 years of age or older. The average household size was 2.61 and the average family size was 3.07.

In the county, the population was spread out, with 25.90% under the age of 18, 11.90% from 18 to 24, 29.80% from 25 to 44, 21.70% from 45 to 64, and 10.70% who were 65 years of age or older. The median age was 34 years. For every 100 females there were 95.30 males. For every 100 females age 18 and over, there were 92.20 males.

The median income for a household in the county was $47,885, and the median income for a family was $57,513. Males had a median income of $42,052 versus $27,602 for females. The per capita income for the county was $22,076. About 5.40% of families and 8.70% of the population were below the poverty line, including 9.10% of those under age 18 and 7.00% of those age 65 or over.

== Politics ==
From its creation until 1952, Butler County strongly favored the Democratic Party in presidential elections, only backing the Republican Party candidate twice (in 1924 and 1928). The Republican Party was in fact so weak that Socialist candidate Eugene Debs came in second in the 1912 election. Starting with the 1952 election, Butler County has become a Republican Party stronghold, with the sole Democrat to win the county in a presidential election since then being Lyndon B. Johnson in 1964 in the midst of a landslide statewide and national victory.

United States presidential election results for Butler County, Ohio
Year	Republican		Democratic		Third party(ies)	
Year	No.	%	No.	%	No.	%
1856	2,301	37.68%	3,509	57.47%	296	4.85%
1860	2,867	39.19%	4,109	56.16%	340	4.65%
1864	3,250	42.96%	4,316	57.04%	0	0.00%
1868	3,298	40.01%	4,945	59.99%	0	0.00%
1872	2,993	37.55%	4,926	61.80%	52	0.65%
1876	3,351	35.68%	6,029	64.20%	11	0.12%
1880	3,831	37.90%	6,266	62.00%	10	0.10%
1884	3,976	36.72%	6,751	62.34%	102	0.94%
1888	4,143	34.77%	7,454	62.55%	319	2.68%
1892	4,636	36.16%	7,834	61.10%	352	2.75%
1896	5,936	40.21%	8,724	59.09%	103	0.70%
1900	6,025	39.52%	8,880	58.25%	339	2.22%
1904	7,048	45.44%	7,397	47.69%	1,066	6.87%
1908	7,320	40.61%	9,678	53.70%	1,026	5.69%
1912	3,431	20.59%	7,763	46.59%	5,469	32.82%
1916	5,850	31.81%	10,806	58.75%	1,736	9.44%
1920	14,998	44.91%	16,437	49.22%	1,961	5.87%
1924	19,349	56.25%	11,612	33.76%	3,437	9.99%
1928	29,124	64.66%	15,663	34.77%	255	0.57%
1932	19,673	44.70%	22,516	51.16%	1,819	4.13%
1936	17,842	35.80%	29,892	59.99%	2,098	4.21%
1940	23,380	43.14%	30,821	56.86%	0	0.00%
1944	22,702	45.96%	26,698	54.04%	0	0.00%
1948	21,393	46.52%	24,276	52.78%	322	0.70%
1952	35,769	53.77%	30,751	46.23%	0	0.00%
1956	41,785	63.20%	24,331	36.80%	0	0.00%
1960	46,518	58.66%	32,778	41.34%	0	0.00%
1964	31,413	42.63%	42,278	57.37%	0	0.00%
1968	35,962	48.73%	23,649	32.04%	14,191	19.23%
1972	50,380	68.42%	21,194	28.78%	2,061	2.80%
1976	49,625	57.56%	35,123	40.74%	1,469	1.70%
1980	61,231	61.91%	31,796	32.15%	5,874	5.94%
1984	76,216	72.92%	27,700	26.50%	598	0.57%
1988	75,725	68.71%	33,770	30.64%	713	0.65%
1992	63,375	48.34%	39,682	30.27%	28,055	21.40%
1996	67,023	54.76%	43,690	35.70%	11,685	9.55%
2000	86,587	63.32%	46,390	33.93%	3,760	2.75%
2004	109,872	65.86%	56,243	33.71%	704	0.42%
2008	105,341	60.52%	66,030	37.94%	2,688	1.54%
2012	105,176	61.68%	62,388	36.58%	2,966	1.74%
2016	106,976	61.13%	58,642	33.51%	9,376	5.36%
2020	114,392	61.26%	69,613	37.28%	2,732	1.46%
2024	114,831	62.66%	66,713	36.41%	1,708	0.93%

United States Senate election results for Butler County, Ohio1
Year	Republican		Democratic		Third party(ies)	
Year	No.	%	No.	%	No.	%
2024	104,952	57.91%	69,734	38.48%	6,557	3.62%
2018	80,106	59.02%	55,604	40.96%	26	0.02%

== Education ==
There are sixteen school districts having territory in Butler County.

=== Primary Boundaries in Butler County ===
- Edgewood City School District (also in Preble)
  - Edgewood High School, Trenton (The Cougars)
- Fairfield City School District
  - Fairfield High School, Fairfield (The Indians)
- Hamilton City School District
  - Hamilton High School, Hamilton (Big Blue)
- Lakota Local School District
  - Lakota East High School, Liberty Township (The Thunderhawks)
  - Lakota West High School, West Chester (The Firebirds)
- Madison Local School District
  - Madison High School, Middletown (The Mohawks)
- Middletown City School District (also in Warren)
  - Middletown High School, Middletown (The Middies)
- Monroe Local School District (also in Warren)
  - Monroe High School, Monroe (The Hornets)
- New Miami Local School District
  - New Miami High School, New Miami (The Vikings)
- Ross Local School District
  - Ross High School, Hamilton (The Rams)
- Talawanda City School District (also in Preble)
  - Talawanda High School, Oxford (Brave)

=== Partial Boundaries in Butler County ===
- Mason City School District, Mason OH (Primarily in Warren County)
- Northwest Local School District, Cincinnati OH (Primarily in Hamilton County)
- Preble Shawnee School District, Camden OH (Primarily in Preble County)
- Princeton City School District, Springdale OH (Primarily in Hamilton County)
- Southwest Local School District, Harrison OH (Primarily in Hamilton County)
- Union County–College Corner Joint School District, Liberty IN (Partial in Preble County, Ohio, Primarily in Union and Franklin Counties in Indiana)

=== Private High Schools ===
- Father Stephen T. Badin High School, (Known as Badin High School), Hamilton (The Rams)
- Cincinnati Christian Schools, Fairfield (The Cougars)
- Middletown Christian Schools, Middletown (The Eagles) (School complex located in Warren County)

=== Higher Education ===
Butler County is home to Miami University.

==== Campuses ====
- Miami University Main Campus, located in Oxford, OH. Founded in 1809.
- Miami University Middletown, located in Middletown. Founded in 1966, this is Ohio's first regional campus.
- Miami University Hamilton, located in Hamilton. Founded in 1968.
- Miami University Voice of America Learning Center, located in West Chester. Founded in 2009, this campus houses the Farmer School of Business MBA program.

Butler County is also home to Butler Tech, a Career Technical Education institution for High School students and Adults. Butler Tech has campuses in West Chester and Fairfield Township.

== Communities ==
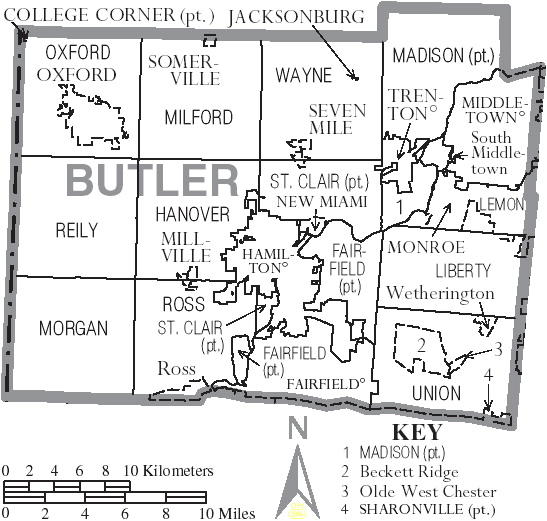
Map of Butler County, Ohio with municipal and township labels

=== Cities ===
- Fairfield
- Hamilton (county seat)
- Middletown
- Monroe
- Oxford
- Sharonville
- Trenton

=== Villages ===
- College Corner
- Jacksonburg
- Millville
- New Miami
- Seven Mile

=== Census-designated places ===
- Beckett Ridge
- Darrtown
- Four Bridges
- Olde West Chester
- Ross
- Somerville
- Wetherington
- Williamsdale
- Woodsdale

=== Unincorporated communities ===
- Alert
- Bethany
- Blue Ball
- Collinsville
- Excello
- Indian Springs
- Maud
- McGonigle
- Miltonville
- Okeana
- Oneida
- Overpeck
- Pisgah
- Poasttown
- Port Union
- Scipio
- Shandon
- Tylersville
- West Middletown
- Woodsdale

=== Townships ===
There are thirteen civil townships in Butler County and three paper townships:

==== Civil ====
- Fairfield
- Hanover
- Lemon
- Liberty
- Madison
- Milford
- Morgan
- Oxford
- Reily
- Ross
- St. Clair
- Wayne
- West Chester (formerly Union Township)

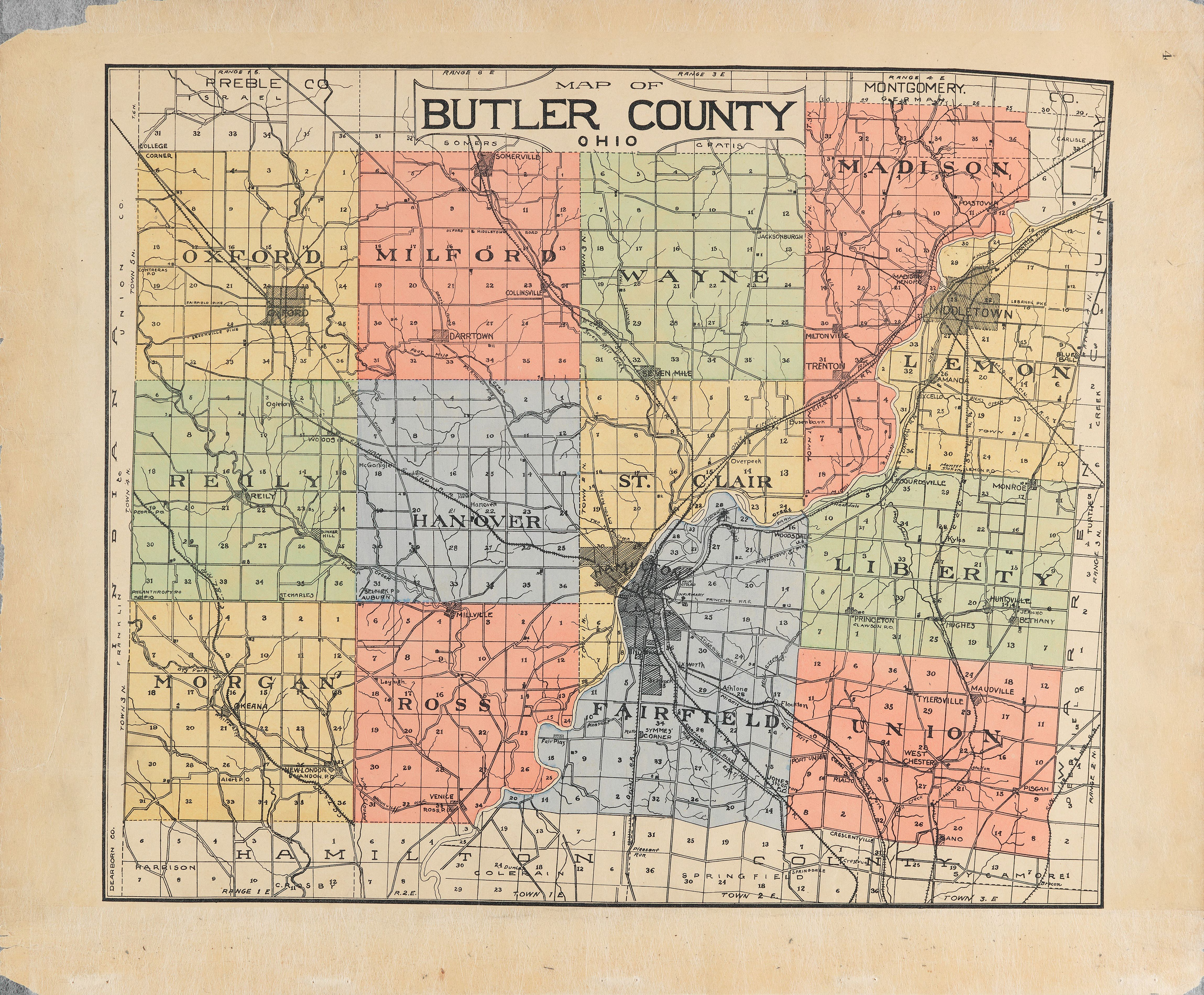
1914 Map of Butler County, Ohio

==== Paper ====
- Hamilton
- Heritage (Fairfield)
- Middletown

==== Ohio House Districts ====
- Ohio House of Representatives, 51st District
- Ohio House of Representatives, 52nd District
- Ohio House of Representatives, 53rd District
- Ohio House of Representatives, 54th District

==== Ohio Senate Districts ====
- Ohio Senate, 4th District
- Ohio Senate, 7th District

== Transportation ==
The Butler County Regional Transit Authority provides bus service throughout the county primarily serving Hamilton, Oxford, and Middletown. The service connects to the Southwest Ohio Regional Transit Authority in Springdale.

=== Airports ===
The Butler County Regional Airport is located three nautical miles (3.5 mi; 5.6 km) southeast of Hamilton's central business district.

=== Major highways ===
- I-75
- US 27
- US 42
- US 127
- SR 4
- SR 63
- SR 73
- SR 122
- SR 126
- SR 128
- SR 129
- SR 130
- SR 177
- SR 503
- SR 732
- SR 744
- SR 747
- SR 748

=== Former highways ===
U.S. Route 25 in Ohio

== Notable people ==
- Walter Alston, manager of Brooklyn/Los Angeles Dodgers
- Lucky Baldwin, California pioneer and businessman
- John Boehner, congressman, Speaker of the House
- Mary Bowermaster, masters athletics record holder
- James E. Campbell, governor of Ohio
- Cris Carter, football player
- Frank Clair, football player
- Ray Combs, television personality
- Chase Crawford, actor and film producer
- Greg Dulli, musician
- Weeb Ewbank, football coach
- Andrew L. Harris, governor of Ohio
- Donald Harvey, serial killer
- William Dean Howells, writer
- Lorenzo D. Immell, Medal of Honor recipient in the American Civil War
- Howard Jones, football coach
- Kenesaw Mountain Landis, federal judge and baseball commissioner
- Mark Lewis, baseball player
- Jerry Lucas, basketball player
- McGuire Sisters, musical group
- Ezra Meeker, Oregon Trail preservationist
- Joe Nuxhall, baseball player and radio announcer, both for the Cincinnati Reds
- Darrell Pace, Olympic archer
- Clarence Page, columnist
- Nan Phelps, artist
- Charles Francis Richter, scientist devising the Richter scale for earthquakes
- Glen Rogers, serial killer
- Charlie Root, baseball player
- Bonnie Rotten, award-winning pornographic actress
- Brady Seals, musician
- Kent Tekulve, baseball player
- Roger Troutman, musician
- C. William Verity, politician and businessman
- Scott Walker, musician
- Simon Stepaniak, NFL player for the Green Bay Packers.

== See also ==
- National Register of Historic Places listings in Butler County, Ohio
