= Four Bridges, Ohio =

- Census-designated place
- Location within Ohio
- Coordinates: 39°22′58″N 84°21′16″W
- Country: United States
- State: Ohio
- County: Butler
- Townships: Liberty, West Chester

Area
  - Total: 2.20 sq mi (5.69 km^{2})
  - Land: 2.19 sq mi (5.68 km^{2})
  - Water: 0.0039 sq mi (0.01 km^{2})
- Elevation: 853 ft (260 m)

Population (2020)
  - Total: 3,401
  - Density: 1,549.7/sq mi (598.33/km^{2})
- Time zone: UTC-5 (Eastern (EST))
  - Summer (DST): UTC-4 (EDT)
- FIPS code: 39-28058
- GNIS feature ID: 2584362

Four Bridges is a census-designated place (CDP) in Liberty and West Chester townships, Butler County, Ohio, United States. The population was 3,401 at the 2020 census.

== Geography ==
Four Bridges is located along the eastern border of Butler County, in the southeast part of Liberty Township. It is bordered to the south by West Chester Township and to the east by the city of Mason in Warren County. Four Bridges consists primarily of housing developments around two golf courses, Four Bridges Country Club and Green Crest Golf Club.

Interstate 75 forms the western edge of the CDP, with access from Exit 24 (Liberty Way). Downtown Cincinnati is 24 miles (39 km) to the south, and Dayton is 30 miles (48 km) to the north.

According to the United States Census Bureau, the Four Bridges CDP has a total area of 2.2 square miles (5.7 km^{2}), all land.

== Demographics ==
Historical population
| Census | Pop. | Note | %± |
|---|---|---|---|
| 2020 | 3,401 | | — |
U.S. Decennial Census

=== 2020 census ===
As of the 2020 census, Four Bridges had a population of 3,401. The median age was 45.1 years. 23.9% of residents were under the age of 18 and 20.4% of residents were 65 years of age or older. For every 100 females there were 90.7 males, and for every 100 females age 18 and over there were 86.8 males age 18 and over.

100.0% of residents lived in urban areas, while 0.0% lived in rural areas.

There were 1,267 households in Four Bridges, of which 36.6% had children under the age of 18 living in them. Of all households, 64.2% were married-couple households, 12.9% were households with a male householder and no spouse or partner present, and 20.0% were households with a female householder and no spouse or partner present. About 23.1% of all households were made up of individuals and 12.3% had someone living alone who was 65 years of age or older.

There were 1,332 housing units, of which 4.9% were vacant. The homeowner vacancy rate was 0.4% and the rental vacancy rate was 10.5%.

Racial composition as of the 2020 census
| Race | Number | Percent |
|---|---|---|
| White | 2,846 | 83.7% |
| Black or African American | 143 | 4.2% |
| American Indian and Alaska Native | 3 | 0.1% |
| Asian | 244 | 7.2% |
| Native Hawaiian and Other Pacific Islander | 0 | 0.0% |
| Some other race | 27 | 0.8% |
| Two or more races | 138 | 4.1% |
| Hispanic or Latino (of any race) | 88 | 2.6% |
