= Madison Township, Butler County, Ohio =

Township in Ohio, US

- Township
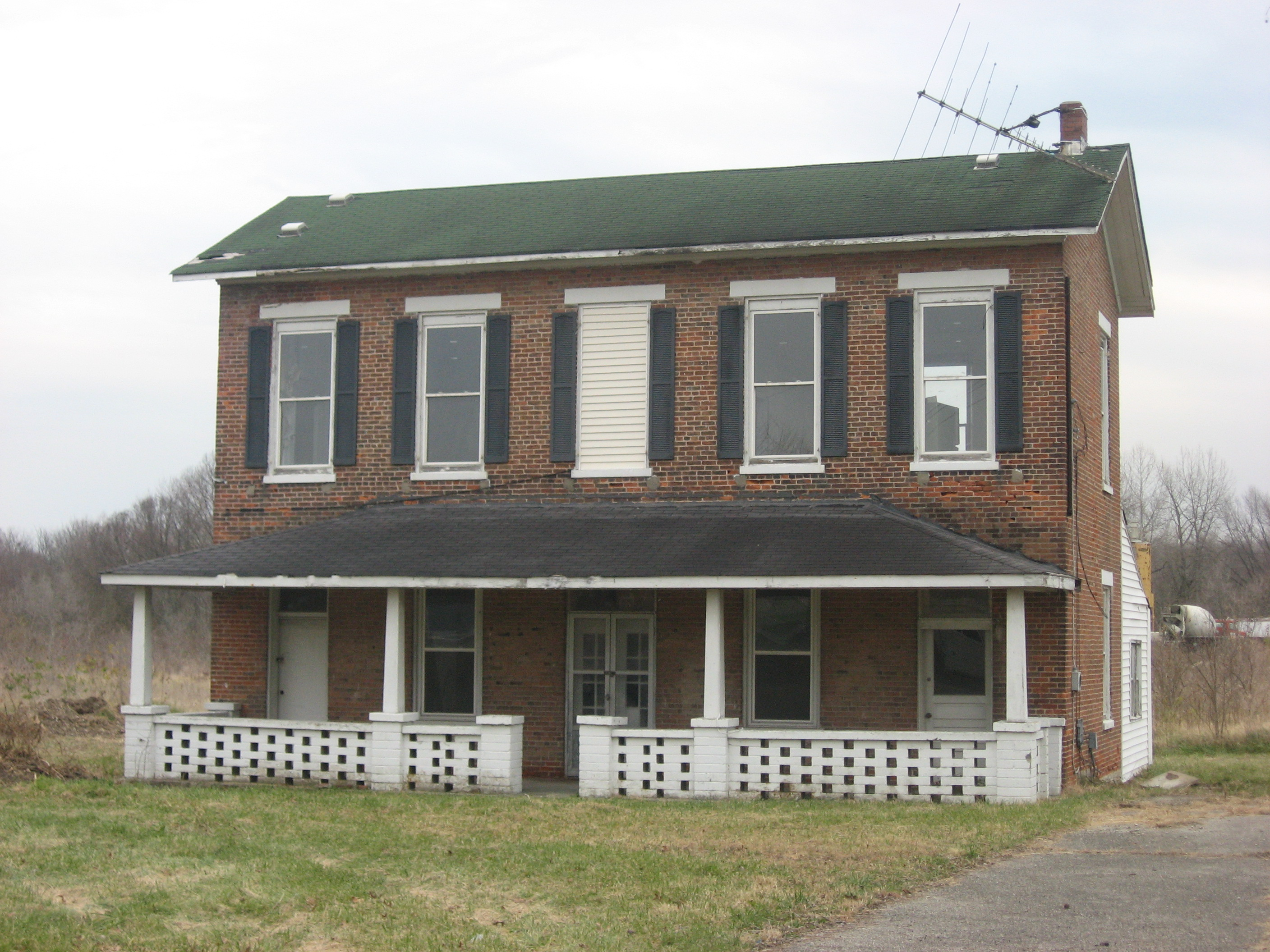
- Former Mill Office and Post Office in Woodsdale

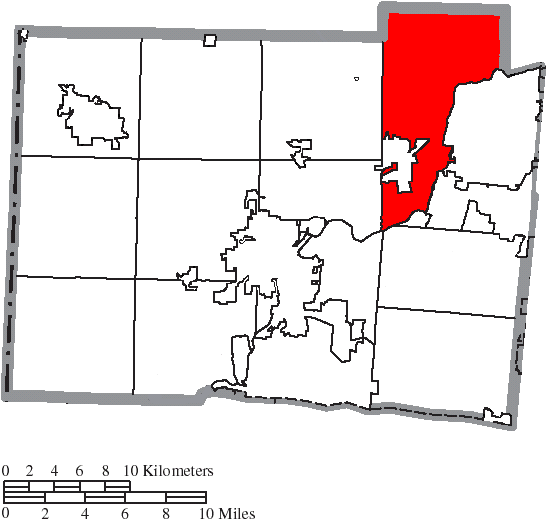
- Location of Madison Township in Butler County
- Coordinates: 39°32′21″N 84°25′29″W
- Country: United States
- State: Ohio
- County: Butler

Area
  - Total: 36.1 sq mi (93.6 km^{2})
  - Land: 35.8 sq mi (92.6 km^{2})
  - Water: 0.39 sq mi (1.0 km^{2})
- Elevation: 725 ft (221 m)

Population (2020)
  - Total: 8,556
  - Density: 236/sq mi (91.2/km^{2})
- Time zone: UTC-5 (Eastern (EST))
  - Summer (DST): UTC-4 (EDT)
- FIPS code: 39-46340
- GNIS feature ID: 1085813
- Website: madisontwpbutleroh.gov

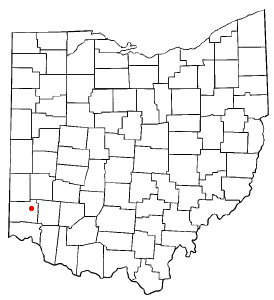
Madison Township, Butler County, Ohio

Madison Township is one of thirteen townships in Butler County, Ohio, United States. Located in northeastern Butler County, just west of Middletown, it had a population of 8,556 people as of the 2020 census. While it surrounds the city of Trenton, the city is no longer part of the township. It is named for James Madison, president of the United States at the time of its creation in 1810, and is one of twenty Madison Townships statewide.

== Geography ==
The township is in what is commonly known as the Congress Lands, that part of Ohio surveyed under the regular U.S. government survey. It originally consisted of 32 whole and 19 fractional sections.

Located in the northeastern corner of the county, it borders the following townships:

- German Township, Montgomery County - north
- Franklin Township, Warren County - east
- Lemon Township - southeast
- Liberty Township - south
- Fairfield Township - southwest, south of St. Clair Township
- St. Clair Township - southwest, north of Fairfield Township
- Wayne Township - west
- Gratis Township, Preble County - northwest

It is the only county township to border Montgomery County.

Within Madison Township are located several unincorporated communities:

- Poasttown, in the northeastern part of the township
- West Middletown, in the eastern part of the township
- Woodsdale, on the border with St. Clair Township in the township's far south

== History ==
The township, the ninth in order of creation, was erected from Lemon Township by the Butler County Commissioners on May 7, 1810, following a petition by residents of the district.

The first election for township officers was on May 19, 1810.

== Government ==
The township is governed by a three-member board of trustees, who are elected in November of odd-numbered years to a four-year term beginning on the following January 1. Two are elected in the year after the presidential election and one is elected in the year before it. There is also an elected township fiscal officer, who serves a four-year term beginning on April 1 of the year after the election, which is held in November of the year before the presidential election. Vacancies in the fiscal officership or on the board of trustees are filled by the remaining trustees.

== Public services ==
The major roads are State Routes 4 (a main road from Cincinnati to Dayton via Middletown), 122 (which links Lebanon to Middletown), and 744.

The township is in the Madison Local School District and the Edgewood Local School District.
