= Port Union, Ohio =

Unincorporated community in Ohio, U.S.

Coordinates: 39°19′58″N 84°27′48″W

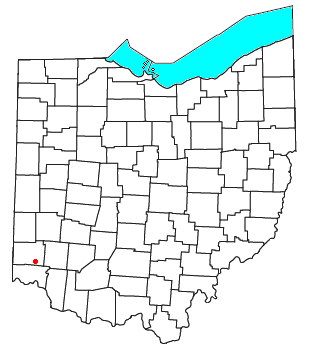
Location of Port Union, Ohio

Port Union is an unincorporated community in western West Chester Township, Butler County, Ohio, United States, on State Route 747 about three miles north of Springdale and three miles southeast of Hamilton. The town was laid out in 1827 by William Elliott alongside the turning basin for the Miami and Erie Canal and was about midway between Crescentville and Hamilton on the canal. It was originally known as McMaken's Bridge, but took the name its township. (West Chester Township was Union Township until 2000). The Cincinnati, Hamilton, and Dayton Railroad later laid tracks through Port Union.

The town possessed its own school district until the 1920s when it merged with the other districts in the township.
