= West Middletown, Ohio =

Unincorporated community in Ohio, U.S.

Coordinates: 39°31′25″N 84°25′05″W

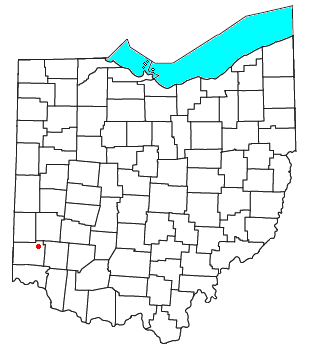
Location of West Middletown, Ohio

West Middletown is an unincorporated community in eastern Madison Township, Butler County, Ohio, United States. It is located on the west shore of the Great Miami River about one mile from Middletown. It had about 200 people in 1905 and was formerly a station on the Cincinnati, Hamilton, and Dayton Railroad. Founded as Madison City, it received the name Heno when it was awarded a post office in 1882. Since there was already another Madison City in Ohio, the postmaster general demanded a name change. According to legend, as old-timers were discussing the new name around the cracker barrel in the general store, a can of Heno tea caught their attention. So the town was named for the tea. But in 1907, the postmaster general decreed the village was within the shadow of Middletown, and only a few postal workers had ever heard of Heno, making it difficult to sort and forward mail to the place. The government ordered the village to accept the name of West Middletown. In 1963 the postmaster general in another decree closed the West Middletown post office, transferring its business to Middletown.
