= Poast Town, Ohio =

Unincorporated community in Ohio, USA

Coordinates: 39°32′50″N 84°23′00″W

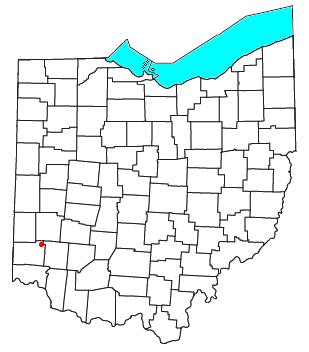
Location of Poast Town, Ohio

Poast Town is an unincorporated community located in northeastern Madison Township, Butler County, Ohio, United States, on State Route 4, about one mile north of Middletown in Section 12 of T2R4 of the Congress Lands. It was laid out in 1818 by Peter Post as the town of West Liberty. A post office with the name Poast Town was established in 1848 but closed in 1934. Mail is provided through the Middletown post office, it is located in the Middletown telephone exchange. It is in the Madison Local School District.
