= Liberty Township, Butler County, Ohio =

Township in Ohio, US

- Township
- Flag Logo
- Motto: "Embraced by Nature. Inspired by Progress."
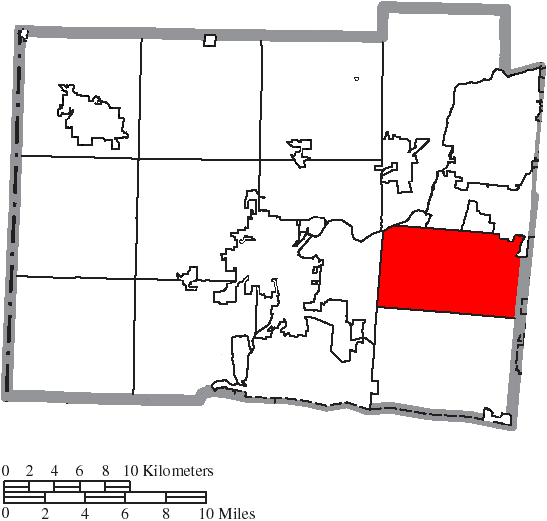
- Location of Liberty Township in Butler County

- Butler County
- Coordinates: 39°23′54″N 84°24′59″W
- Country: United States
- State: Ohio
- County: Butler

Area
  - Total: 29.3 sq mi (75.8 km^{2})
  - Land: 29.2 sq mi (75.7 km^{2})
  - Water: 0.039 sq mi (0.1 km^{2})
- Elevation: 751 ft (229 m)

Population (2020)
  - Total: 43,999
  - Density: 1,270/sq mi (492/km^{2})
- Time zone: UTC-5 (Eastern (EST))
  - Summer (DST): UTC-4 (EDT)
- FIPS code: 39-43050
- GNIS feature ID: 1085812
- Website: liberty-township.com

Liberty Township is a suburb of Cincinnati located in Butler County, Ohio. It is one of thirteen townships in Butler County, Ohio, United States. The population was 43,999 at the 2020 census. It is located on the east-central part of the county, just south of the city of Monroe.

== History ==
The township was named for Liberty, Pennsylvania, at the suggestion of John Morrow, a resident in the township at the time of its formation in 1803 who was the brother of Ohio Governor Jeremiah Morrow, after his hometown. The first settler was John Nelson, who arrived in 1796, seven years before Ohio became a state. It is one of 25 Liberty Townships statewide.

The Miami and Erie Canal passed through the northwest corner of the township. The Dayton Short Line, now the Norfolk Southern, ran through the township.

== Geography ==
The original boundaries included what is now West Chester Township, which was separated from Liberty Township by the Butler County Commissioners on June 2, 1823. Today, the township is located in the eastern part of the county and borders the following townships:

- Lemon Township - north
- Turtlecreek Township, Warren County - northeast
- Deerfield Township, Warren County - southeast
- West Chester Township - south
- Fairfield Township - west
- Madison Township - northwest, across the Great Miami River

The northeast corner of the township is part of the city of Monroe, the sole municipality in Liberty Township. Unincorporated places are Bethany, Four Bridges, Hughes Station, Kyles Station, Jericho, and Princeton.

=== Climate ===
Climate data for Liberty Township, Butler County, Ohio
Month	Jan	Feb	Mar	Apr	May	Jun	Jul	Aug	Sep	Oct	Nov	Dec	Year
Record high °F (°C)	72 (22)	76 (24)	84 (29)	89 (32)	93 (34)	97 (36)	104 (40)	101 (38)	98 (37)	88 (31)	81 (27)	75 (24)	104 (40)
Mean daily maximum °F (°C)	38 (3)	43 (6)	53 (12)	65 (18)	75 (24)	83 (28)	87 (31)	86 (30)	79 (26)	68 (20)	54 (12)	43 (6)	64.5 (18.1)
Mean daily minimum °F (°C)	19 (−7)	21 (−6)	30 (−1)	39 (4)	49 (9)	58 (14)	63 (17)	61 (16)	53 (12)	41 (5)	32 (0)	24 (−4)	40.8 (4.9)
Record low °F (°C)	−25 (−32)	−13 (−25)	−10 (−23)	18 (−8)	27 (−3)	36 (2)	40 (4)	41 (5)	26 (−3)	12 (−11)	−3 (−19)	−22 (−30)	−25 (−32)
Average rainy days	3.18	2.72	3.73	4.10	4.96	4.52	4.04	4.18	3.14	3.09	3.65	3.35	44.66
Source: weather.com

== Demographics ==
Historical population
Census	Pop.	Note	%±
1900	1,024		—
1910	986		−3.7%
1920	1,024		3.9%
1930	1,481		44.6%
1940	1,628		9.9%
1950	2,195		34.8%
1960	3,143		43.2%
1970	3,736		18.9%
1980	6,506		74.1%
1990	9,314		43.2%
2000	22,819		145.0%
2010	37,259		63.3%
2020	43,999		18.1%

=== 2020 census ===
Liberty Township racial composition
Race	Number	Percentage
White (NH)	31,570	71.8%
Black or African American (NH)	3,279	7.45%
Native American (NH)	142	0.32%
Asian (NH)	2,682	6.10%
Pacific Islander (NH)	7	0.02%
Other/mixed	3,911	8.89%
Hispanic or Latino	2,408	5.47%

== Government ==
The township is governed by a three-member board of trustees, who are elected in November of odd-numbered years to a four-year term beginning on the following January 1. Two are elected in the year after the presidential election and one is elected in the year before it. There is also an elected township fiscal officer, who serves a four-year term beginning on April 1 of the year after the election, which is held in November of the year before the presidential election. Vacancies in the fiscal officership or on the board of trustees are filled by the remaining trustees. Day-to-day functions are overseen by a township administrator, hired by the trustees, who typically has an assistant, also approved by the trustees. All of Liberty Township lies in Ohio's 8th congressional district which elected John Boehner as its Representative until he resigned in October 2015. He was then succeeded by current Representative Warren Davidson.

== Infrastructure ==
The old Cincinnati and Dayton Turnpike, later known as Dixie Highway and U.S. Route 25, is now Cincinnati-Dayton Road. It connects the township to Monroe to the north and Sharonville to the south. Major highways today include the Butler County Veterans Highway (also known as State Route 129), which connects Interstate 75 to Hamilton through the southern tier of the township, and State Route 4, which links Hamilton to Middletown. I-75 runs through the eastern edge of the township with direct access to Liberty Township at Liberty Way (Exit 24), plus at two exits along the Butler County Veterans Highway (State Route 129).

== Notable people ==
- Margaret Conditt, state representative
- Luke Null, comedian
