= Ohio State Route 732 =

State highway in western Ohio, US

State Route 732

Route information
- Maintained by ODOT
- Length: 30.94 mi (49.79 km)
- Existed: 1938–present

Major junctions
- South end: SR 129 near Millville
- US 27 in Oxford; SR 177 in Morning Sun; US 127 in Eaton
- North end: US 35 / US 127 / SR 122 in Eaton

Location
- Country: United States
- State: Ohio
- Counties: Butler, Preble

Highway system
- Ohio State Highway System; Interstate; US; State; Scenic
← SR 730	→ SR 733

State Route 732 (SR 732) is a state highway in the U.S. state of Ohio. This two-lane state route begins at SR 129 (Hamilton-Scipio Road) in Butler County, and extends northward to end at the junction of U.S. Route 127 (US 127) and US 35/SR 122 in Eaton in Preble County, Ohio, traveling 30.94 miles (49.79 km).

This route gives access from northern and western Ohio via Interstate 70 (I-70) or US 127 to Miami University in Oxford and Hueston Woods State Park. It also passes the historic Fort St. Clair.

== Route description ==
The south end of SR 732 is at SR 129 (Hamilton-Scipio Road) west of Millville, and three miles (4.8 km) east of the Indiana-Ohio border at Scipio. The route follows Sample Road going north from this intersection in Butler County for 3 miles (5 km) to Reily. In Reily, it turns east for a block and then continues north crossing Indian Creek as it leaves Reily as Oxford-Reily Road. Oxford is about 6 miles (10 km) north. SR 732 ascends a steep hill near Indian Creek Park. SR 732 continues north past a sharp bend as it leaves the creek and ascends to the flashing caution light as it crosses Stillwell-Becket Road with the water tower at the southwest corner of this intersection. SR 732 continues north through farm fields on a straight road passing Talawanda Middle School on the east side of the road.

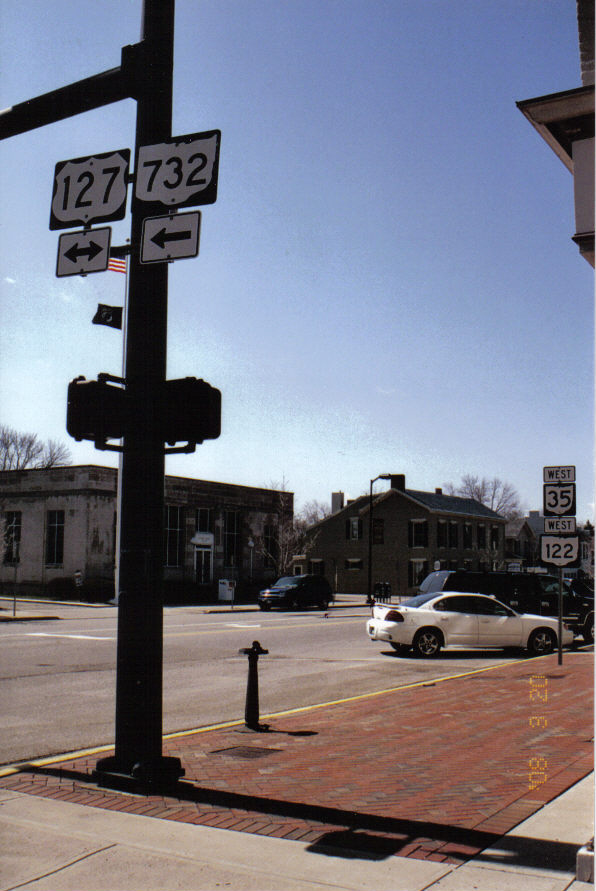
North end of SR 732 at the Eaton Post Office in Eaton, Ohio

SR 732 reaches the southwest corner of Oxford at the intersection of Oxford-Reily Road with West Chestnut Street. Chestnut Street is also known as Brookville Road. SR 732 turns eastbound on Chestnut Street and passes a traffic signal at South Locust Street, continuing east to the north end of Kehr Road. When SR 732 meets College Street, it passes the Talawanda Board of Education and Talawanda High School. SR 732 turns left on Main Street proceeding north and uphill to the traffic light on US 27 (High Street). Miami University is a few blocks east on High Street. SR 732 continues on Main Street northbound past the Presbyterian Church and McCullough-Hyde Hospital leaving Oxford and passing the historic Black Covered Bridge over Talawanda Creek. It is about 20 miles (32 km) to Eaton before reaching the Butler-Preble County line.

Just north of the county line is the east entrance to Hueston Woods State Park. A bit north of the park entrance is Oxford-Eaton Road (Preble County Road 29) which runs past the ODOT facility to join SR 177 northwestward to Morning Sun. SR 732 continues concurrent with SR 177 until a bit north of Morning Sun, where SR 732 continues due north crossing SR 725. SR 732 continues to jog east and north past Lakengren to meet US 127 at a traffic light in the south side of Eaton, the county seat of Preble County. One mile before the US 127 intersection is Eaton High School. The northern terminus of SR 732 is .5 miles (0.8 km) north at the US 35/SR 122 intersection with US 127 northwest of the Eaton County Court House in downtown Eaton.

According to ODOT District 8, the number of vehicles carried is between 660 and 5,270 vehicles a day, depending on the section. The 2010 Preble County Traffic Survey shows that the 10 mile segment of highway ending at U.S. 35 in Eaton had an average traffic volume of 4700 vehicles in a 24-hour period.

== History ==
The first military road in Butler County was built in 1791 by General Arthur St. Clair from Cincinnati to Hamilton and continuing north to the fortifications at Eaton. This road was about 7 miles (11 km) east of Oxford and SR 732 and followed Seven Mile Creek This was done in his unsuccessful campaign. In 1794 General Anthony Wayne constructed a road north from Fort Hamilton a few miles east of St. Clair's road, giving rise to the long multi-county road "Wayne Trace". In 1804 the Ohio Legislature passed an act requiring roads to be 20 feet (6.1 m) wide with stumps not to exceed one foot.

Eaton Road (future SR 732) is clearly marked on McBride's Map of Oxford Township of 1836. The land and overshot mill of the Austins is also marked where Eaton Road crosses Talawanda Creek. Aaron Austin whose 1816 homestead is still near the Black Covered Bridge operated the Mill here on Talawanda Creek. The mill eventually passed into the hands of Pugh and the Austin land passed into the hands of a successful swine breeder, David Magie, a contributor to the Poland China Hog. The covered bridge was called Black by local people to distinguish it from the white painted bridge one mile (1.6 km) downstream which carried the traffic of the future SR 73.

The enumeration of Ohio State Routes began in 1924, but was adjusted by the 1926–27 effort of the Federal Government to do the same. Added to the system in 1938, SR 732 was the longest of four Butler County routes to be designated by number that year. The Butler County Engineers Office indicates that SR 732 was rerouted in 1951 to use the current bridge crossing Talawanda Creek a few hundred feet east of the Black Bridge. There being no other bridge piers in evidence shows that the Black Bridge carried SR 732 until 1951.

The precursor to SR 732 between Oxford and Eaton was laid out in March 1811. The road began on the Great Miami River at Derrough's Ford, proceeding north to Oxford and then on to Eaton.

The Black Covered Bridge spanning Talawanda Creek just north of the Oxford City limits was constructed in 1868. The bridge was renovated in 1998 and can be viewed by the passerby from the current SR 732 bridge by looking upstream (west). This bridge spans Talawanda Creek which is 209 feet (64 m) wide at this point. It is exceeded in length by only a few Ohio covered bridges. Built by Bandin, Butin and Bowman in 1868 and 1869, it incorporates both the truss style of Childs and that of Long in one bridge. The first version was an arched structure with a roadway width of 18 feet (5.5 m). In 1869 a stone pier was added as a support beneath the center of the bridge. The bow in the bridge was removed by replacing some wooden cross members with threaded iron rods. The nuts at the ends of these were loosened so that the bow was straightened and the middle of the bridge was lowered onto the pier. The bridge is so named to distinguish it from the white bridge east of Oxford and was useful in servicing Pugh's Mill at the time of construction. The Butler County Engineers Office-BCEO indicates that SR 732 was rerouted in 1951 to use the current bridge crossing Talawanda Creek a few hundred feet east of the Black Bridge. There being no other bridge piers in evidence shows that the Black Bridge carried SR 732 until 1951.

== Major intersections ==
County	Location	mi	km	Destinations	Notes
Butler	Reily Township	0.00	0.00	SR 129 (Hamilton Scipio Road) to SR 126 / SR 252 / SR 748 – Hamilton, Brookville, IN	
Butler	Oxford	9.37	15.08	US 27 (High Street) to SR 73 – Oxford Community Arts Center, Miami University	
Preble	Israel Township	14.64	23.56	SR 177 south – Hamilton	Southern end of SR 177 concurrency
Preble	Israel Township	17.17	27.63	SR 177 north to SR 227 – Richmond, IN	Northern end of SR 177 concurrency
Preble	Israel Township	18.97	30.53	SR 725 to SR 44 – Camden, Liberty, IN	
Preble	Eaton	30.56	49.18	US 127 south (South Barron Street)	Southern end of US 127 concurrency
Preble	Eaton	30.94	49.79	US 35 / SR 122 (Main Street) / US 127 north (North Barron Street) to I-70	Northern end of US 127 concurrency
1.000 mi = 1.609 km; 1.000 km = 0.621 mi: Concurrency terminus
