= Ohio State Route 127 =

State Route 127

Route information
- Maintained by ODOT

Location
- Country: United States
- State: Ohio

Highway system
- Ohio State Highway System; Interstate; US; State; Scenic
← US 127	→ SR 128

In Ohio, State Route 127 may refer to:

- U.S. Route 127 in Ohio, the only Ohio highway numbered 127 since 1927
- Ohio State Route 127 (1923-1927), now SR 129
