= Ohio State Route 129 =

State highway in Butler County, Ohio, US

State Route 129

Route information
- Maintained by ODOT
- Length: 25.86 mi (41.62 km)
- Existed: 1926–present

Major junctions
- West end: SR 126 / SR 252 near Scipio
- US 27 in Millville; US 127 / SR 177 in Hamilton; I-75 in Bethany
- East end: Cox Road in Bethany

Location
- Country: United States
- State: Ohio
- Counties: Butler

Highway system
- Ohio State Highway System; Interstate; US; State; Scenic
← SR 128	→ SR 130
← US 127	→ SR 128

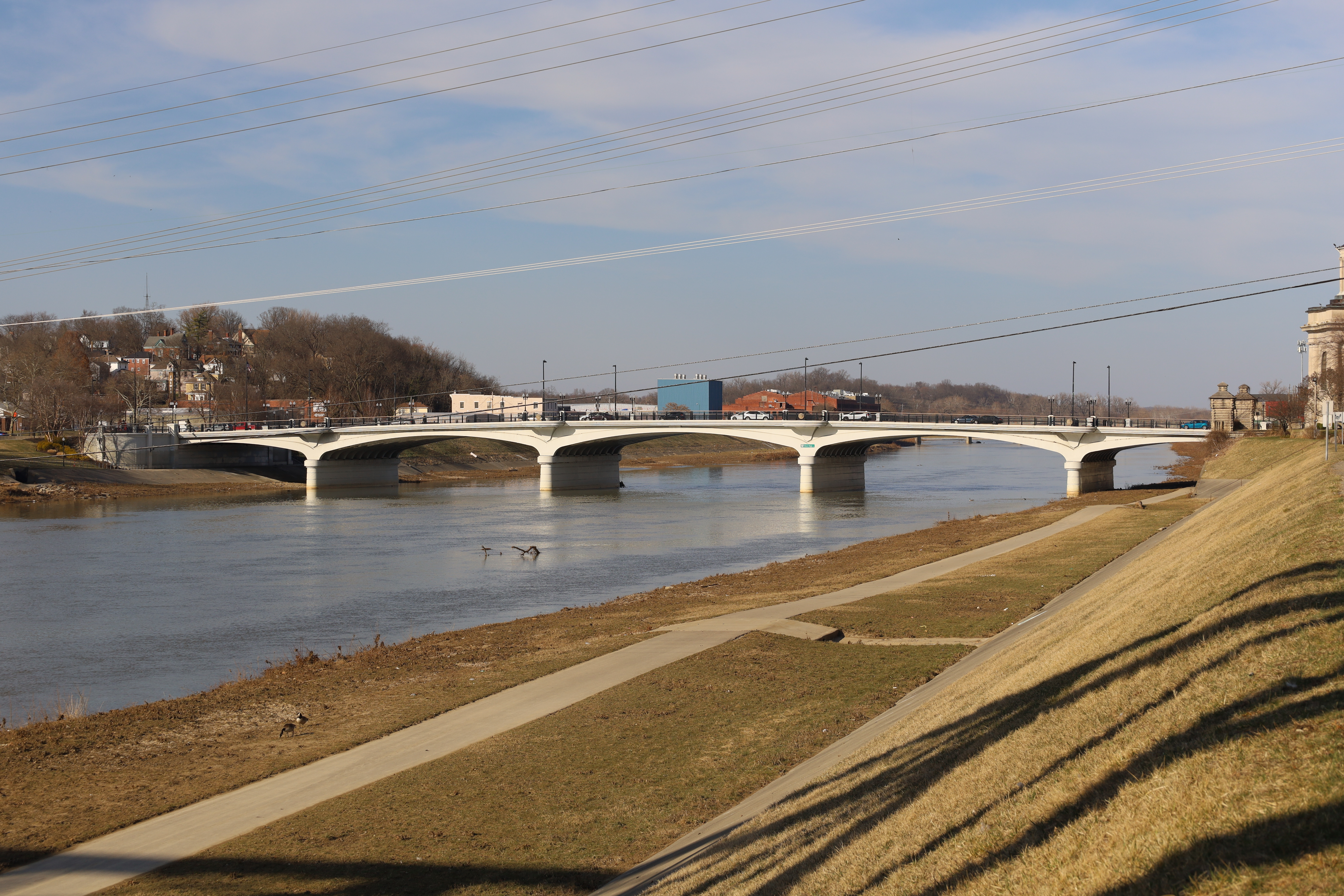
SR 129 and SR 177 cross the Great Miami River over the High Street Bridge in Hamilton, Ohio.

State Route 129 (SR 129) is an east–west highway in southwest Ohio running from its western terminus at SR 126 and Indiana State Road 252, just east of the Indiana–Ohio state line near Scipio, Ohio. Its eastern terminus is east of Interstate 75 (I-75) at Cox Road in Liberty Township. The route's eastern terminus was historically at SR 747 until 1999 when the route was moved south 1/2 mile (0.80 km) to the newly built Butler County Veterans Highway.

== Route description ==
In 2024, the section of SR 129 along the Reily–Morgan township line from the Indiana state line to Chapel Road was designated in honor of Sgt. Anthony M. K. Vinnedge, near his hometown of Okeana. Vinnedge, a 24-year-old, 2001 graduate of Talawanda High School, was killed on July 5, 2007, in Iraq, while serving with Troop C, 2nd Squadron, 107th Armor Cavalry Regiment in the Ohio Army National Guard. Vinnedge enlisted in the U.S. Army in 2002, serving on active duty for three years, later serving in the Ohio Army National Guard as a Patriot Missile battery operator. During his second tour in Iraq, he was stationed at the Radwaniyah Palace Complex when he was killed. Vinnedge is buried in Greenwood Cemetery in Hamilton.

== Butler County Veterans Highway ==
Butler County Veterans Highway is signed as SR 129 and is a limited access highway from Hamilton to its terminus at Interstate 75. The highway was conceived in the early 1970s as a link to I-75 from Hamilton. At the time, Hamilton was the second largest city in the U.S. without a direct connection to an Interstate. The highway has had three names. The original name was the Butler County Regional Highway. Shortly after the highway was built, the highway was renamed the Michael A. Fox Highway in honor of an incumbent Butler County Commissioner and former state legislator. In 2004 the highway was renamed to the Butler County Veterans Highway.

== Major intersections ==
The entire route is in Butler County.

Location	mi	km	Exit	Destinations	Notes
Reily–Morgan township line	0.00	0.00		SR 126 east (Cincinnati Brookville Road) / SR 252 west – Brookville, Venice	Western terminus; western terminus of SR 126; eastern terminus of SR 252
Reily–Morgan township line	3.02	4.86		SR 732 north (Sample Road) – Oxford, Eaton	Southern terminus of SR 732
Millville	8.24	13.26		SR 748 south (Millville Shandon Road) – Shandon	Northern terminus of SR 748
Millville	8.76	14.10		US 27 south – Ross, Cincinnati	Western end of US 27 concurrency
Millville	9.05	14.56		US 27 north – Oxford, Liberty, Richmond	Eastern end of US 27 concurrency
Hamilton	13.71	22.06		SR 177 north – Morning Sun, Boston, Richmond, Union City	
Hamilton	14.71	23.67		US 127 to SR 128 (Martin Luther King Jr. Boulevard) – Eaton, Fairfield, Ross, Cincinnati	
Hamilton	15.30	24.62		SR 4 (Erie Boulevard) – Middletown, Dayton, Fairfield, Cincinnati	
Fairfield Township	17.83	28.69	Western terminus of freeway		
Fairfield Township	17.83	28.69	18	SR 4 Byp. – Middletown, Fairfield	
Liberty Township	20.62	33.18	21	SR 747 – Middletown, Woodlawn	
Liberty Township	24.56	39.53	24	Cincinnati Dayton Road – Childrens (Liberty Campus)	
Liberty Township	25.44– 25.86	40.94– 41.62	25B	I-75 north – Dayton	Eastbound left exit and westbound entrance; I-75 exit 24
Liberty Township	25.44– 25.86	40.94– 41.62	25A	I-75 south – Cincinnati	Eastbound exit and westbound entrance
Liberty Township	25.44– 25.86	40.94– 41.62		Cox Road / Veterans Blvd	Eastern terminus; roundabout
1.000 mi = 1.609 km; 1.000 km = 0.621 mi: Concurrency terminus; Incomplete access
