= Ohio State Route 130 =

State highway in Butler County, Ohio, US

State Route 130
- Old Oxford Road

Route information
- Maintained by ODOT
- Length: 4.72 mi (7.60 km)
- Existed: 1926–present

Major junctions
- West end: US 27 in McGonigle
- East end: SR 177 in Hamilton

Location
- Country: United States
- State: Ohio
- Counties: Butler

Highway system
- Ohio State Highway System; Interstate; US; State; Scenic
← SR 129	→ SR 131

State Route 130 (SR 130) is a short east–west state route in southwestern Ohio. The entirety of SR 130 lies within Butler County. SR 130 has its western terminus at a signalized intersection with U.S. Route 27 (US 27) in McGonigle. Its eastern terminus is also at a signalized intersection, this time at SR 177 in the extreme northwestern corner of Hamilton. For its entire length, SR 130 is alternately known as Old Oxford Road.

== Route description ==
SR 130 commences at a traffic signal with US 27 immediately north of the CSX railway overpass of US 27 in the hamlet of McGonigle. Approximately fifty feet (20 m) east of the beginning of SR 130 in the eastbound direction, the highway intersects Lanes Mill Road. Turning southeasterly, SR 130 travels through Hanover Township paralleling the CSX railway for a short distance. Curving to the east, SR 130 passes by a fair mix of homes and farmland. Approaching the Darrtown Road intersection, SR 130 begins to trend more southeasterly. Beyond Darrtown Road, SR 130 continues as such through where it meets Morman Road.

At Krucker Road, SR 130 starts to resume a more easterly path. The number of homes that appear along SR 130 starts to increase as the route passes by intersections with Boyle Road and Vizedom Road, and closes in on Hamilton. SR 130, now serving a primarily residential vicinity, rounds some gentle curves, but maintains a generally easterly path as it nears its terminus. Just barely sneaking into the northwestern corner of the City of Hamilton, SR 130 comes to an end as it meets SR 177 at a signalized intersection.

== History ==
In 1923, what is now SR 130 was part of then SR 126, which included the entirety of the current SR 130 and the portion of the current US 27 from SR 130 to the Indiana state line at College Corner. In 1927, the SR 126 designation was moved to another routing farther south, and SR 130 came into being along the routing that it occupies today. The entire route was paved in 1932.

== Major intersections ==
The entire route is in Butler County.

Location	mi	km	Destinations	Notes
Hanover Township	0.00	0.00	US 27 – Oxford, Millville	
Hamilton	4.72	7.60	SR 177 / Gardner Road	
1.000 mi = 1.609 km; 1.000 km = 0.621 mi
