= Hanover Township, Butler County, Ohio =

Township in Ohio, US

- Township
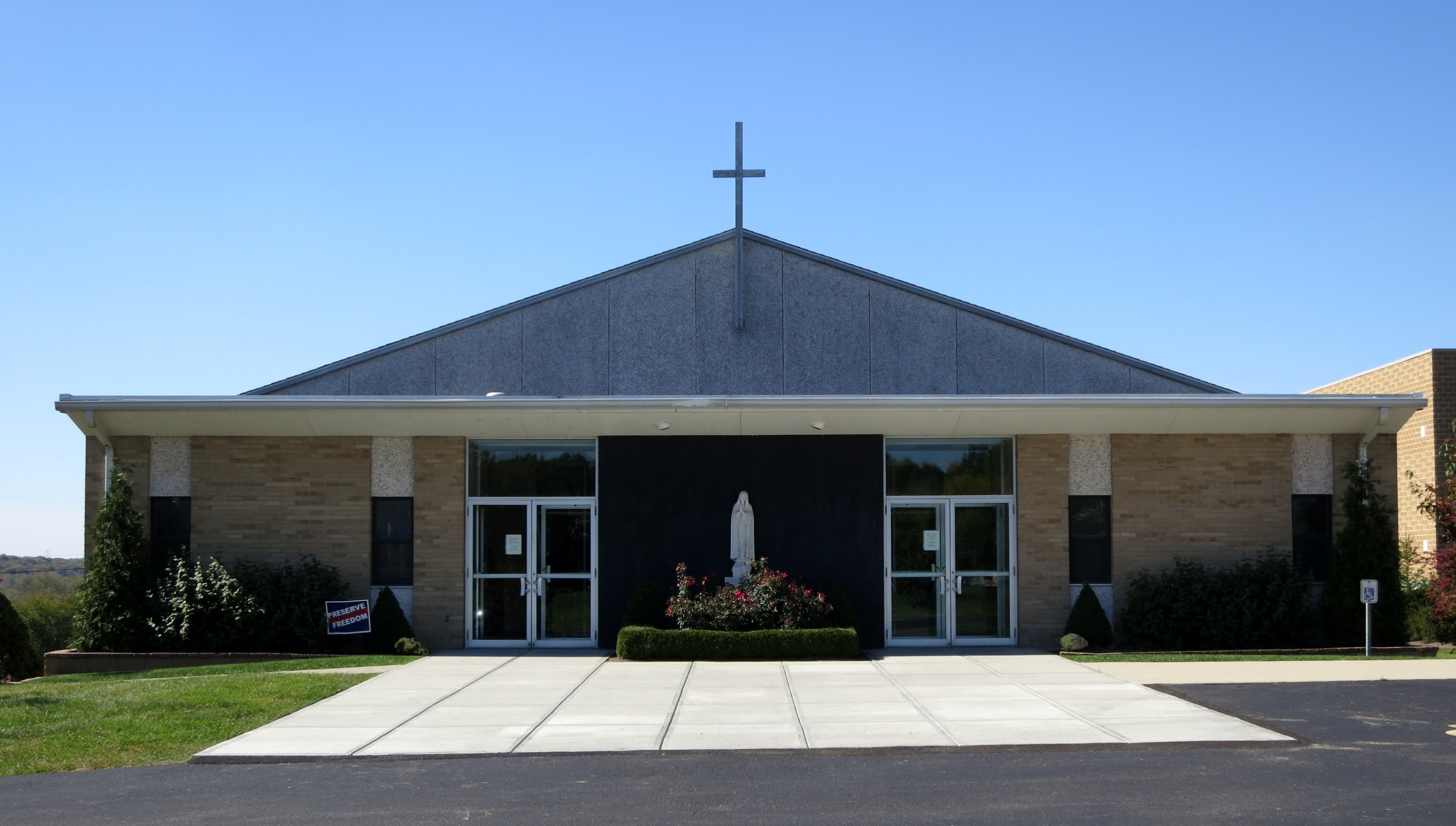
- Queen of Peace Catholic Church near Millville

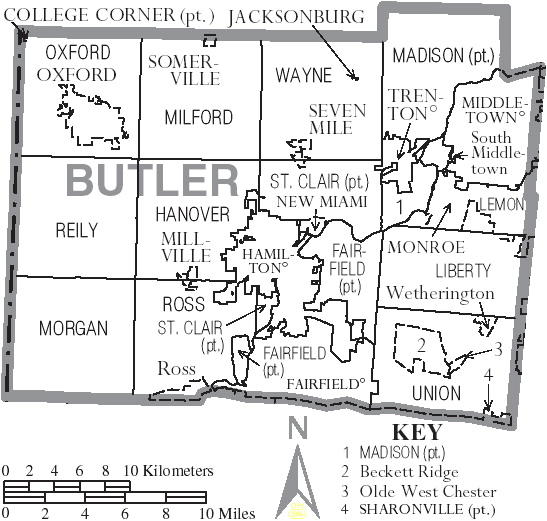
- Municipalities and townships of Butler County

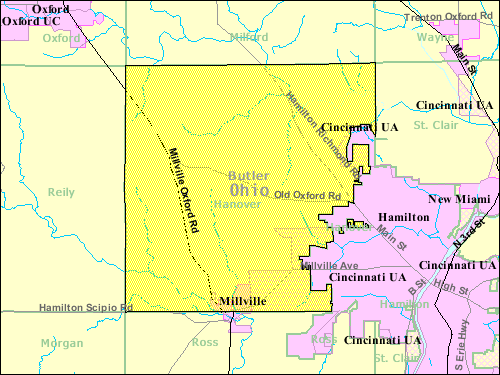
- Detailed map of Hanover Township
- Coordinates: 39°25′41″N 84°38′13″W
- Country: United States
- State: Ohio
- County: Butler

Area
  - Total: 32.12 sq mi (83.19 km^{2})
  - Land: 32.06 sq mi (83.04 km^{2})
  - Water: 0.058 sq mi (0.15 km^{2})
- Elevation: 928 ft (283 m)

Population (2020)
  - Total: 8,111
  - Density: 259/sq mi (100.1/km^{2})
- Time zone: UTC-5 (Eastern (EST))
  - Summer (DST): UTC-4 (EDT)
- FIPS code: 39-33250
- GNIS feature ID: 1085810
- Website: www.hanovertownshipohio.org

Hanover Township is one of thirteen townships Butler County, Ohio, United States. It is located in the west-central part of the county, midway between Hamilton and Oxford. The population of the township was 8,111 at the 2020 census. It is named for Hanover County, Virginia, where the early settlers originated.

== History ==
The twelfth in order of creation, Hanover Township was established from Ross and St. Clair townships by the Butler County Commissioners on December 2, 1811.

== Geography ==
The township consisted of one full survey township in the Congress Lands, and had an area of 36 square miles (93 km^{2}) before the city of Hamilton annexed about 4 square miles (10 km^{2}) of the township on its eastern edge. About half the village of Millville is in Hanover Township (the remainder is in Ross Township). The unincorporated community of McGonigle lies in the township's northwest.

Located in the center of the county, it borders the following townships:

- Milford Township - north
- Wayne Township - northeast
- St. Clair Township - east
- Ross Township - south
- Morgan Township - southwest
- Reily Township - west
- Oxford Township - northwest

== Government ==
The township is governed by a three-member board of trustees, who are elected in November of odd-numbered years to a four-year term beginning on the following January 1. Two are elected in the year after the presidential election and one is elected in the year before it. There is also an elected township fiscal officer, who serves a four-year term beginning on April 1 of the year after the election, which is held in November of the year before the presidential election. Vacancies in the fiscal officership or on the board of trustees are filled by the remaining trustees.

== Transportation ==
In the nineteenth century, the Cincinnati, Hamilton, and Dayton Railroad's Richmond division crossed the township en route from Hamilton with a station at McGonigle. This line, still active, is now part of CSX Transportation.

Major highways are U.S. Route 27, which links Cincinnati to Richmond via Millville and Oxford through the western third of the township; State Route 177, which links Hamilton and Richmond, across the northeast section of the township; State Route 130, which links U.S. 27 and State Route 177 through the center of the township; and State Route 129, which crosses the southeast from Hamilton to Millville.

== Schools ==
Most of the township is in the Talawanda City School District, which was formed by the merger of the Oxford, Hanover, Milford, and Somerville school districts in 1953. However, parts of the township are in three other districts. The Ross Local includes a section on the southern border, the Hamilton City includes territory in the southeast adjacent to the city of Hamilton, and the Edgewood City has a small piece of the township's northeast corner.
