= Morning Sun, Ohio =

- Unincorporated community
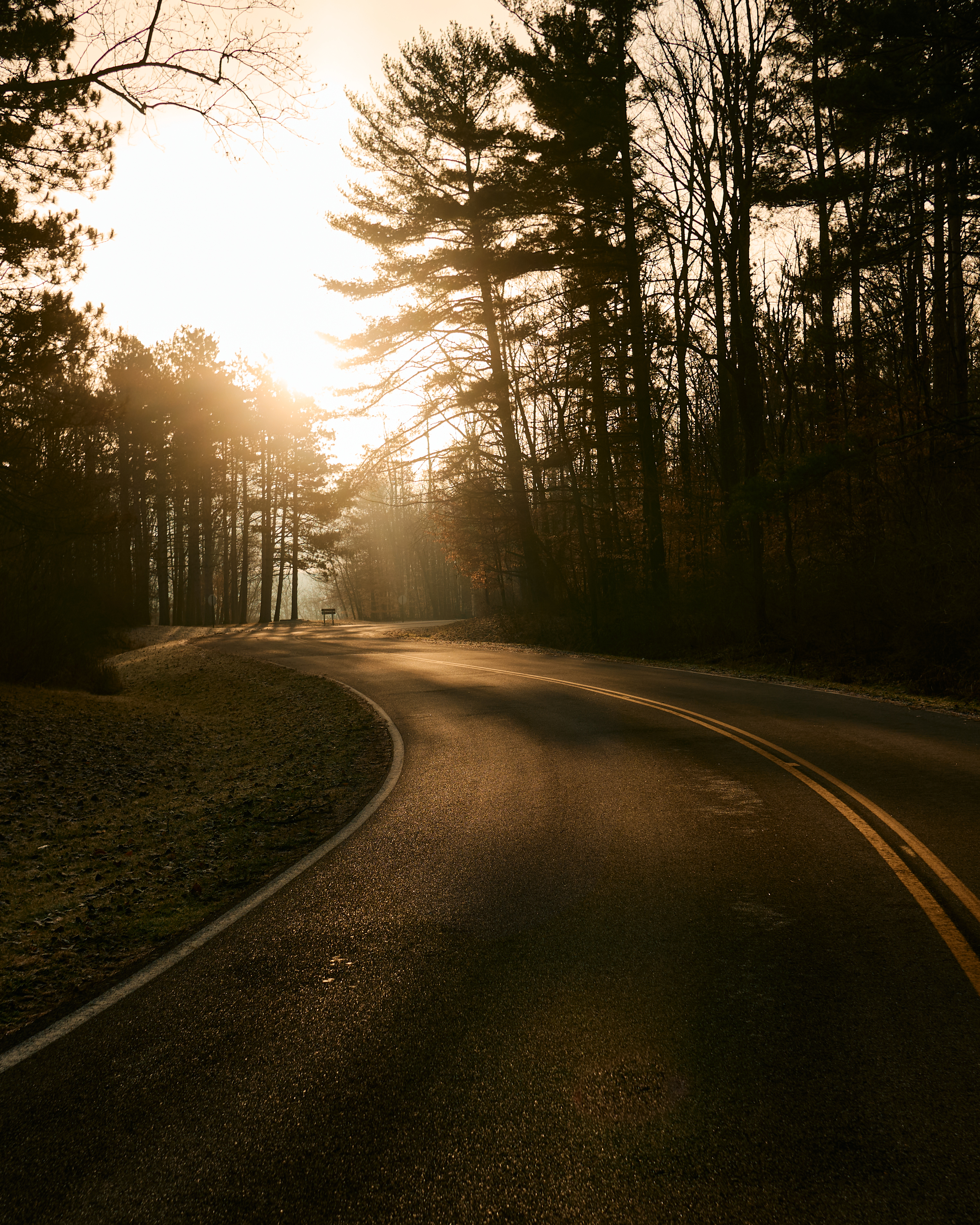

- Location within Ohio Location within the United States
- Coordinates: 39°35′47″N 84°44′14″W
- Country: United States
- State: Ohio
- County: Preble
- Elevation: 997 ft (304 m)
- Time zone: UTC-5 (Eastern (EST))
  - Summer (DST): UTC-4 (EDT)
- Area codes: 937, 326
- GNIS feature ID: 1065864

Morning Sun is an unincorporated community in southeastern Israel Township, Preble County, Ohio, United States. It is located approximately 3.5 miles (5.6 km) south of Fairhaven at the intersection of State Routes 177 and 732 with Morning Sun Road, just north of Hueston Woods State Park. The community is part of the Dayton Metropolitan Statistical Area.

== History ==
Morning Sun was platted in 1833. According to tradition, a sunrise which occurred at the time the first settlers were thinking of a suitable name caused this name to be selected. A post office was established at Morning Sun in 1836, and remained in operation until 1948.

== Notable persons ==
- Richard Elihu Sloan, the last Governor of Arizona Territory, was born in Morning Sun in 1857.
- Rolla Ramsey, an Indiana University Physics Professor and radio electronics pioneer, was born in Morning Sun in 1872.
