= Okeana, Ohio =

Unincorporated community in Ohio, U.S.

Coordinates: 39°20′52″N 84°46′03″W

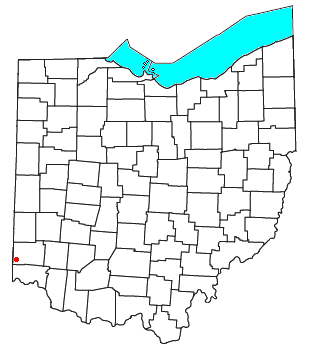
Location of Okeana, Ohio as a red dot in the lower left

Okeana, originally known as Tariff, is an unincorporated community in central Morgan Township, Butler County, Ohio, United States. It is located on Dry Fork Creek, a tributary of the Great Miami River, on State Route 126 about three miles northwest of Shandon in sections 21 and 26 of R1ET3N of the Congress Lands. It is a mile north of Alert, a mile east of Macedonia, and ten miles southwest of Hamilton. The bulk of addresses served by the Okeana post office are in the Ross Local School District, but parts of the region are in the Southwest Local School District.

A post office was established there in 1828 as Tariff, but the name was changed to Okeana on May 27, 1858, after the daughter of the Indian chief Kiatta, for whom a stream in Morgan Township is named. The town of Okeana was established in 1858. The town was laid out by the Rev. Benjamin Lloyd.

== The flag of Okeana, Ohio ==
The blue heron bird image is displayed on the Okeana flag, deriving from the original flag of the Miami Native American nation of Ohio and Indiana (currently of Oklahoma). The Miami flag displays images of a turtle and the blue heron bird. The gold circle around “Okeana” represents Ohio, and is gold to represent Ross school district colors.
