= Ohio State Route 725 =

State highway in southwestern Ohio, US

State Route 725

Route information
- Maintained by ODOT
- Length: 48.07 mi (77.36 km)
- Existed: 1937–present

Major junctions
- West end: SR 44 at the Indiana state line near Fairhaven
- US 127 in Camden; I-75 in Miamisburg; I-675 in Miamisburg
- East end: US 42 near Spring Valley

Location
- Country: United States
- State: Ohio
- Counties: Preble, Montgomery, Greene

Highway system
- Ohio State Highway System; Interstate; US; State; Scenic
← SR 724	→ SR 726

State Route 725 (SR 725) is an east–west state highway in the southwestern portion of the U.S. state of Ohio. Its western terminus is at the Indiana state line approximately 9 miles (14 km) west of Camden at the eastern terminus of Indiana State Road 44; and its eastern terminus is at US 42 just south of Spring Valley.

== Route description ==
The portion of SR 725 between Union Road and Soldiers Home Road in Miamisburg is designated as the "SGT Gary Lee McKiddy Memorial Highway", in honor of a 1968 Miamisburg High School graduate and U.S. Army sergeant. On May 6, 1970, McKiddy, a 20-year-old member of the 1st Squadron, 9th Cavalry Regiment, 1st Cavalry Division, was serving in Cambodia during the Vietnam War; on that date, he pulled a fellow soldier from a burning helicopter; McKiddy then returned to the helicopter in an attempt to rescue the pilot; as he did, the helicopter exploded, killing both McKiddy and the pilot.

The portion of SR 725 between Heincke Road and SR 741 in Miamisburg is designated as the "Marine Corporal Paul W. Zanowick II Memorial Highway", in honor of a Miamisburg High School graduate, nicknamed "Rocky", who was killed in Nahre Saraj District, Helmand Province, Afghanistan on June 3, 2011.

== History ==
SR 725 was first commissioned in 1937 between the Indiana state line and SR 48 in Centerville. In 1939, the route was extended east to US 42 in Spring Valley. In 1965, the road between Miamisburg and I-75 was upgraded to a divided highway. Between 1993 and 1995 the section of highway between I-675 and Centerville was upgraded to a divided highway.

== Major intersections ==
County	Location	mi	km	Destinations	Notes
Preble	Israel Township	0.00	0.00	SR 44 west / State Line Road – Liberty	Indiana state line; road continues south as State Line Rd.
Preble	Israel Township	2.80	4.51	SR 177 – Fairhaven, Hamilton	
Preble	Israel Township	4.01	6.45	SR 732 – Oxford, Eaton	
Preble	Camden	8.78	14.13	US 127 – Hamilton, Eaton	
Preble	Gratis	15.64	25.17	SR 503 (Adda Doty Street)	
Preble	Gratis	15.70	25.27	SR 122 (East Street)	
Montgomery	Germantown	25.13	40.44	SR 4 south – Middletown	Western end of SR 4 concurrency
Montgomery	Germantown	26.68	42.94	SR 4 north – Dayton	Eastern end of SR 4 concurrency
Montgomery	Miamisburg	32.92– 33.15	52.98– 53.35	I-75 – Cincinnati, Dayton	Exit 44 on I-75
Montgomery	Miamisburg	33.37	53.70	SR 741 (Springboro Pike)	
Montgomery	Miamisburg	34.57– 34.72	55.64– 55.88	I-675 – Cincinnati, Columbus	Exit 2 on I-675
Montgomery	Centerville	37.05	59.63	SR 48 south (South Main Street)	Western end of SR 48 concurrency
Montgomery	Centerville	38.12	61.35	SR 48 north (Far Hills Avenue) to I-675	Eastern end of SR 48 concurrency
Greene	Spring Valley	48.07	77.36	US 42 – Xenia, Lebanon	Eastern terminus
1.000 mi = 1.609 km; 1.000 km = 0.621 mi: Concurrency terminus
