= St. Clair Township, Ohio =

St. Clair Township, Ohio may refer to:

- St. Clair Township, Butler County, Ohio
- St. Clair Township, Columbiana County, Ohio
