= Ohio State Route 747 =

State highway in southwestern Ohio, US

State Route 747

Route information
- Maintained by ODOT
- Length: 11.35 mi (18.27 km)
- Existed: 1937–present

Major junctions
- South end: SR 4 in Glendale
- I-275 in Springdale
- North end: SR 4 near Monroe

Location
- Country: United States
- State: Ohio
- Counties: Hamilton, Butler

Highway system
- Ohio State Highway System; Interstate; US; State; Scenic
← SR 746	→ SR 748

State Route 747 (SR 747) is a north–south state highway in the southwestern portion of the U.S. state of Ohio. It connects with SR 4 at both ends, from a signalized intersection in Glendale at the south end to a signalized intersection approximately 2 miles (3.2 km) west of SR 63 near Monroe at the north end, bypassing Fairfield and Hamilton in the process. SR 747 is also known as Princeton-Glendale Road.

== Route description ==
Along its way, SR 747 passes through northern Hamilton County and southern Butler County. No portion of SR 747 is included within the National Highway System, a system of routes deemed most important for the country's economy, mobility and defense.

== History ==
When it was designated in 1937, SR 747 followed the same routing between SR 4 in Glendale and SR 4 near Monroe that it utilizes to this day. The highway has not experienced any major changes to its routing since it was established.

== Major intersections ==
County	Location	mi	km	Destinations	Notes
Hamilton	Glendale	0.00	0.00	SR 4 (Springfield Pike)	
Hamilton	Springdale	2.10	3.38	I-275 to I-74 / I-75 – Dayton, Indianapolis	Exit 42 (I-275)
Butler	Liberty Township	8.13	13.08	SR 129 (Butler County Veterans Highway) to I-75 – Dayton, Cincinnati, Hamilton	Interchange
Butler	Liberty Township	11.35	18.27	SR 4 (Hamilton-Middletown Road) – Hamilton, Middletown	
1.000 mi = 1.609 km; 1.000 km = 0.621 mi
