= Ohio State Route 748 =

State highway in Butler County, Ohio, US

State Route 748
- Millville-Shandon Road

Route information
- Maintained by ODOT
- Length: 5.80 mi (9.33 km)
- Existed: 1937–present

Major junctions
- South end: SR 126 in Shandon
- North end: SR 129 near Millville

Location
- Country: United States
- State: Ohio
- Counties: Butler

Highway system
- Ohio State Highway System; Interstate; US; State; Scenic
← SR 747	→ SR 749

State Route 748 (SR 748) is a north–south state highway in southwestern Ohio, a U.S. state. Situated in west-central Butler County, SR 748 has its southern terminus at SR 126 in the unincorporated community of Shandon. Its northern terminus is at SR 129 near Millville, just one-half mile (0.80 km) west of SR 129's junction with U.S. Route 27.

For its entire length, SR 748 is also known as Millville-Shandon Road.

== Route description ==
Existing entirely within Butler County, SR 748 is not included within the National Highway System.

SR 748 commences at its junction with SR 126 in the hamlet of Shandon. Starting out in a northwesterly direction, the highway passes through a residential neighborhood. Bending to the north, the highway enters into rural Morgan Township. The majority of SR 748 passes amid farmland, with the occasional patch of trees and numerous houses lining the roadway. After traveling due north, the highway bends to the northwest, meets Bell Road, then bends back to the north. SR 748 next bends to the northeast and then east-northeast, as it crosses Morgan-Ross Road, and into Ross Township. Following intersections with Kirchling Road and Layhigh Road, the state route bends back to the northeast, and crosses Fenton Road. The highway passes a number of houses prior to arriving at its endpoint at a T-intersection with SR 129 approximately one-half mile (0.80 km) of U.S. Route 27 and the village of Millville.

== History ==
Created in 1937 along the routing that it currently occupies between SR 126 and SR 129, SR 748 has not experienced any major changes since its inception.

== Major intersections ==
The entire route is in Butler County.

Location	mi	km	Destinations	Notes
Morgan Township	0.00	0.00	SR 126 (Cincinnati Brookville Road)	
Ross Township	5.80	9.33	SR 129 (Hamilton Scipio Road) – Millville, Hamilton, Brookville, IN	
1.000 mi = 1.609 km; 1.000 km = 0.621 mi
