= St. Clair Township, Butler County, Ohio =

Township in Ohio, US

- Township
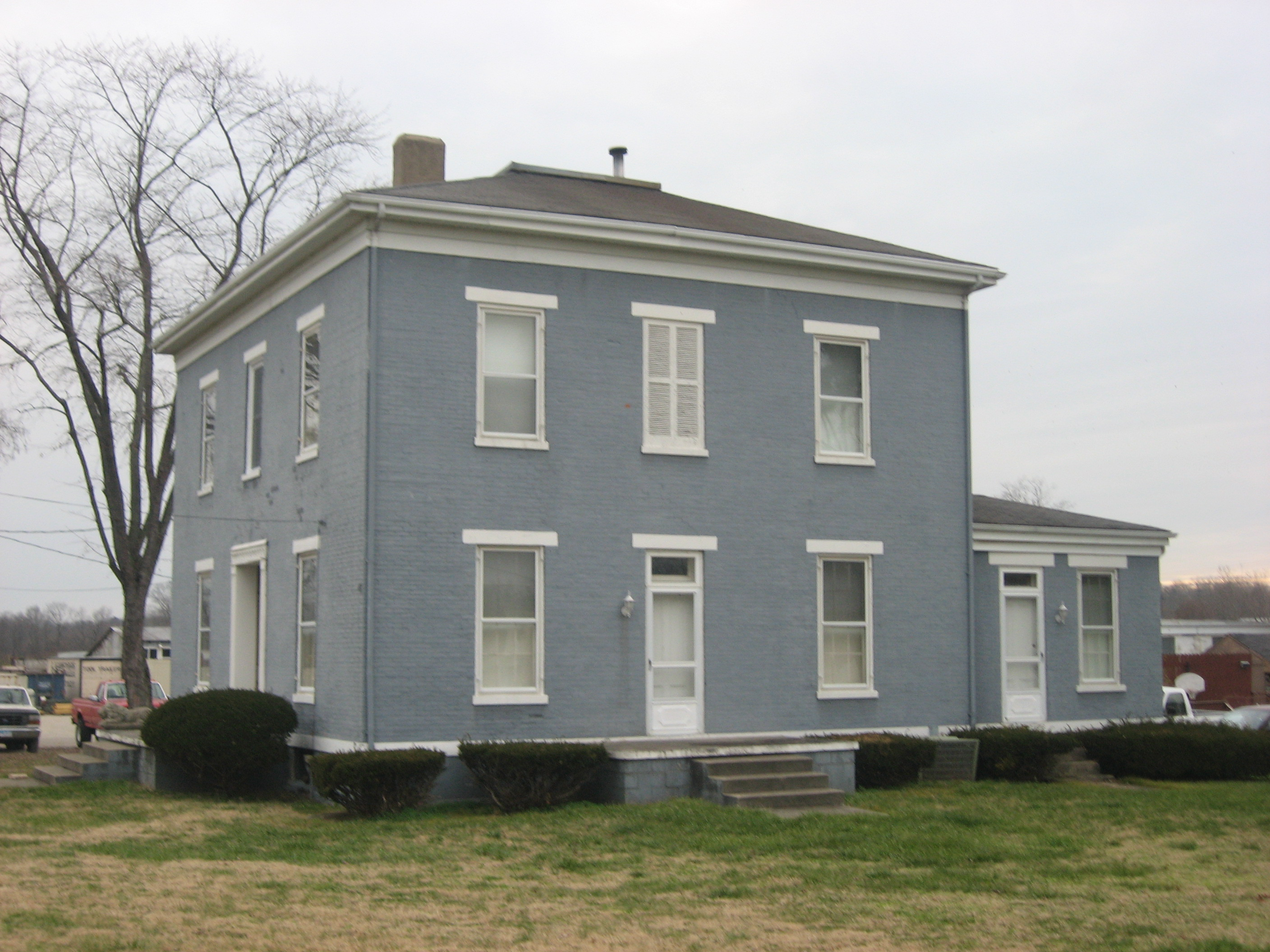
- Samuel Augspurger House at Woodsdale

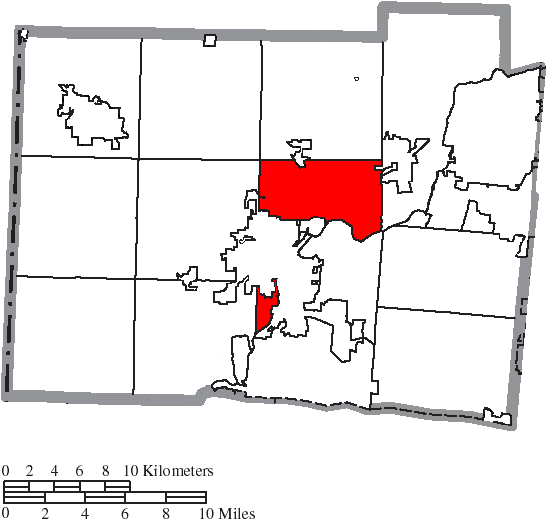
- Location of St. Clair Township in Butler County
- Coordinates: 39°26′20″N 84°32′10″W
- Country: United States
- State: Ohio
- County: Butler

Area
  - Total: 21.4 sq mi (55.5 km^{2})
  - Land: 21.1 sq mi (54.6 km^{2})
  - Water: 0.35 sq mi (0.9 km^{2})
- Elevation: 627 ft (191 m)

Population (2020)
  - Total: 6,671
  - Density: 328/sq mi (126.5/km^{2})
- Time zone: UTC-5 (Eastern (EST))
  - Summer (DST): UTC-4 (EDT)
- FIPS code: 39-69498
- GNIS feature ID: 1085820
- Website: stclairtownshipohio.org

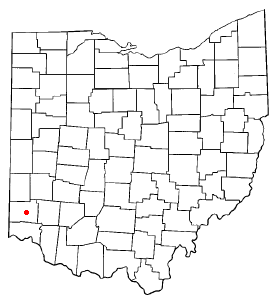
St. Clair Township, Butler County, Ohio

St. Clair Township is one of thirteen townships in Butler County, Ohio, United States. The township consists of three disconnected pieces located along the Great Miami River in the central portion of the county. It had a population of 6,671 at the 2020 census.

== History ==
One of the original five townships of Butler County, it was erected by the Butler County Court of Quarter Sessions on May 10, 1803.

The area of the township has been significantly reduced from the original boundaries. Four new townships were created from it: Milford Township and Wayne Township, both on December 2, 1805; Reily Township on December 7, 1807; and Hanover Township (from parts of St. Clair and Ross townships) on December 2, 1811. What is now Oxford Township was originally within the bounds of St. Clair Township, Oxford having been erected from Milford Township in 1811.

From these reduced borders, which consisted of nineteen whole and nine fractional sections, a substantial area has been withdrawn from the township because of annexations by the city of Hamilton. Most of the area of Hamilton west of the Great Miami River, the township's southern boundary, was originally included in St. Clair Township. In 1857, a paper township, Hamilton, was erected from parts of St. Clair and Fairfield townships.

=== Name ===
It is named for General Arthur St. Clair, governor of the Northwest Territory before Ohio's statehood. Statewide, the only other St. Clair Township is located in Columbiana County.

== Geography ==
Located in the center of the county, it borders the following townships:

- Wayne Township - north
- Madison Township - east
- Fairfield Township - south
- Ross Township - southwest
- Hanover Township - west
- Milford Township - northwest corner

Three unincorporated communities are located in St. Clair Township: Overpeck and Williamsdale in the center, and Woodsdale in the southeast along the border with Madison Township.

== Government ==
The township is governed by a three-member board of trustees, who are elected in November of odd-numbered years to a four-year term beginning on the following January 1. Two are elected in the year after the presidential election and one is elected in the year before it. There is also an elected township fiscal officer, who serves a four-year term beginning on April 1 of the year after the election, which is held in November of the year before the presidential election. Vacancies in the fiscal officership or on the board of trustees are filled by the remaining trustees.

== Roads and industry ==
The principal highways are U.S. Route 127 (the main road between Hamilton and Eaton), and State Routes 128 and 177.

The Miller Brewing Company operates a brewery in the northeast, on the line with Madison Township. The Cincinnati Gas and Electric Company has a generating plant in the township.
