= Ohio State Route 27 =

State Route 27

Route information
- Maintained by ODOT

Location
- Country: United States
- State: Ohio

Highway system
- Ohio State Highway System; Interstate; US; State; Scenic
← US 27	→ SR 28

In Ohio, State Route 27 may refer to:

- U.S. Route 27 in Ohio, the only Ohio highway numbered 27 since 1927
- Ohio State Route 27 (1923-1927), now US 50 (Cincinnati to Milford), SR 28 (Milford to Chillicothe), and SR 180 (Chillicothe to Logan)
