= Shandon, Ohio =

Coordinates: 39°19′35″N 84°42′53″W

- Unincorporated community
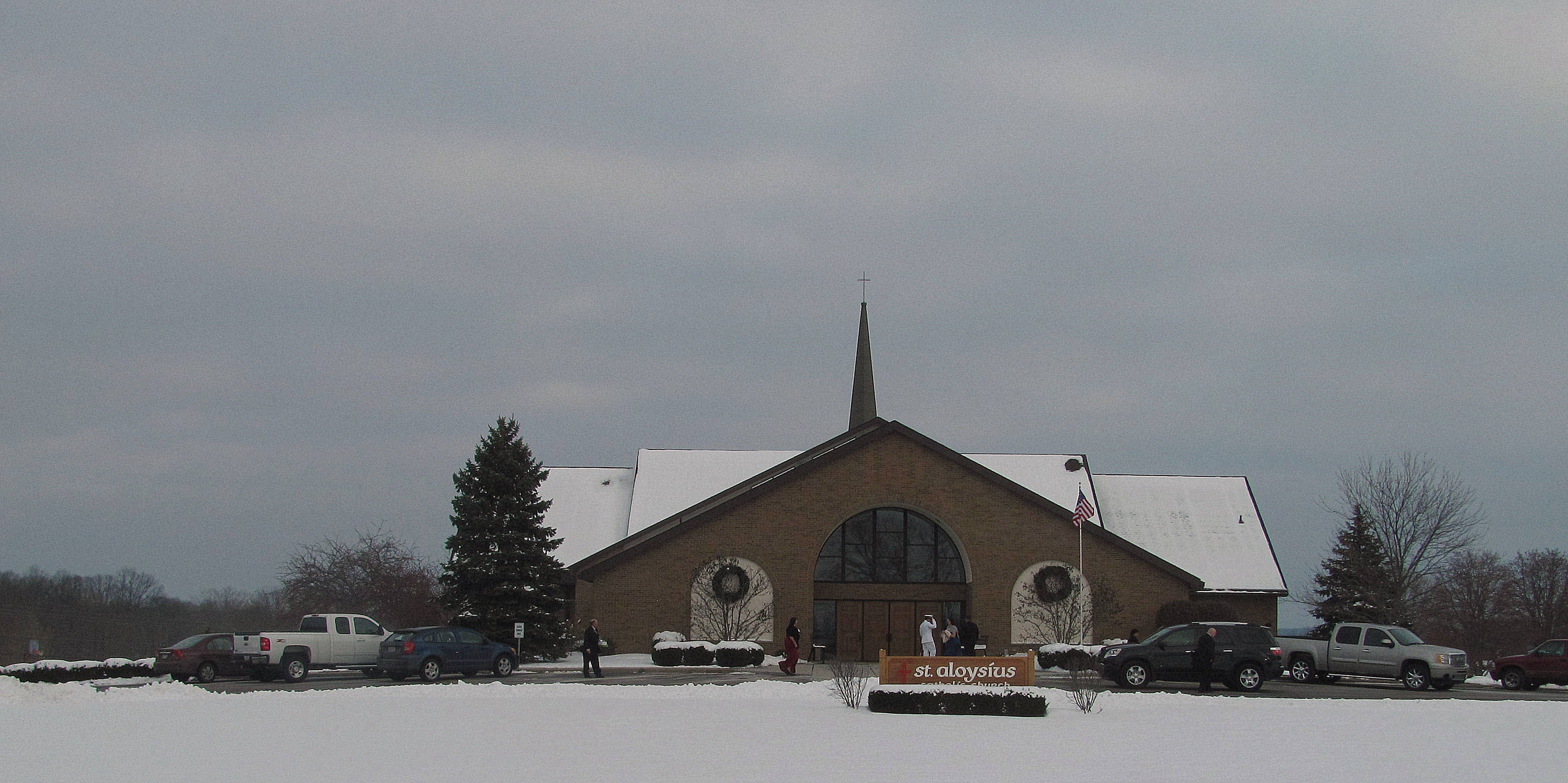
- Saint Aloysius Catholic Church in Shandon, Ohio

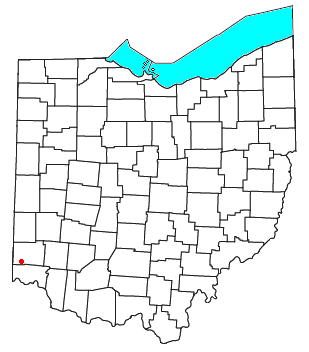
- Location of Shandon, Ohio
- Country: United States
- State: Ohio
- County: Butler
- Unincorporated community ship: Morgan
- Time zone: UTC-5 (Eastern (EST))
  - Summer (DST): UTC-4 (EDT)
- ZIP codes: 45063

Shandon, originally Paddy's Run, is an unincorporated community in southwestern Morgan Township, Butler County, Ohio, United States. It is located on Paddy's Run, a tributary of the Great Miami River, about four miles west of Ross at the intersection of State Routes 126 and 748 in section 25 of R1ET3N of the Congress Lands. The town is in the Ross Local School District.

== History ==
The foundation for the first Welsh settlement in Ohio was laid on June 29, 1801, when William and Morgan Gwilym purchased land in what is now Morgan Township at the Cincinnati Land Office. Settlement in the Paddy's Run area started in 1802, a year before Ohio became the 17th state. The land was then in Hamilton County. Ohio's first General Assembly carved Butler County out of Hamilton County March 24, 1803. Hamilton was selected as the county seat July 15, 1803. Shandon may be the Butler County community that's had the most names in its 200-year history. Although settled by Welsh, its first post office created June 10, 1831 bore an Irish name, Paddy's Run. It's also been known, officially and unofficially, as Cambria, Glendower (in reference to Owain Glyndŵr), Vaughan, New London and Bagdad before becoming Shandon in 1893.

Ohio nineteenth Governor William Bebb (December 8, 1802 - October 23, 1873) was an early resident of Paddy's Run, before entering politics he ran a boarding school for boys here which was called "Bebb's High".

Some original Welsh settlers are also buried in the New London (Paddy's Run) Cemetery. The cemetery is adjacent to the old Congregational Church. The church was founded 1803, a brick Meetinghouse was built in 1824 and it is now being restored as the Community House. The present church was built in 1854. The church and cemetery are on Alert-New London Road in Morgan Township.

== Residents ==
- Murat Halstead
