= McGonigle, Ohio =

Unincorporated community in Ohio, U.S.

Coordinates: 39°26′45″N 84°40′59″W

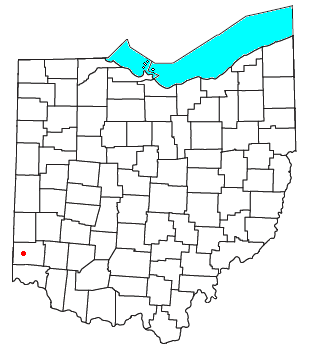
Location of McGonigle, Ohio

McGonigle is an unincorporated community in northwestern Hanover Township, Butler County, Ohio, United States about seven miles northwest of Hamilton at the intersection of U.S. Route 27 and State Route 130 in sections 17 and 18 of R2ET4N of the Congress Lands. It was formerly a stop on the Cincinnati, Hamilton, and Dayton Railroad's Indianapolis branch. It was named for Philip McGonigle, an early settler, and is spelled in various ways (McGonigle is the spelling on the official Butler County highway map).
