= Voice of America Bethany Relay Station =

Radio broadcasting station in Ohio, US

National Voice of America Museum of Broadcasting
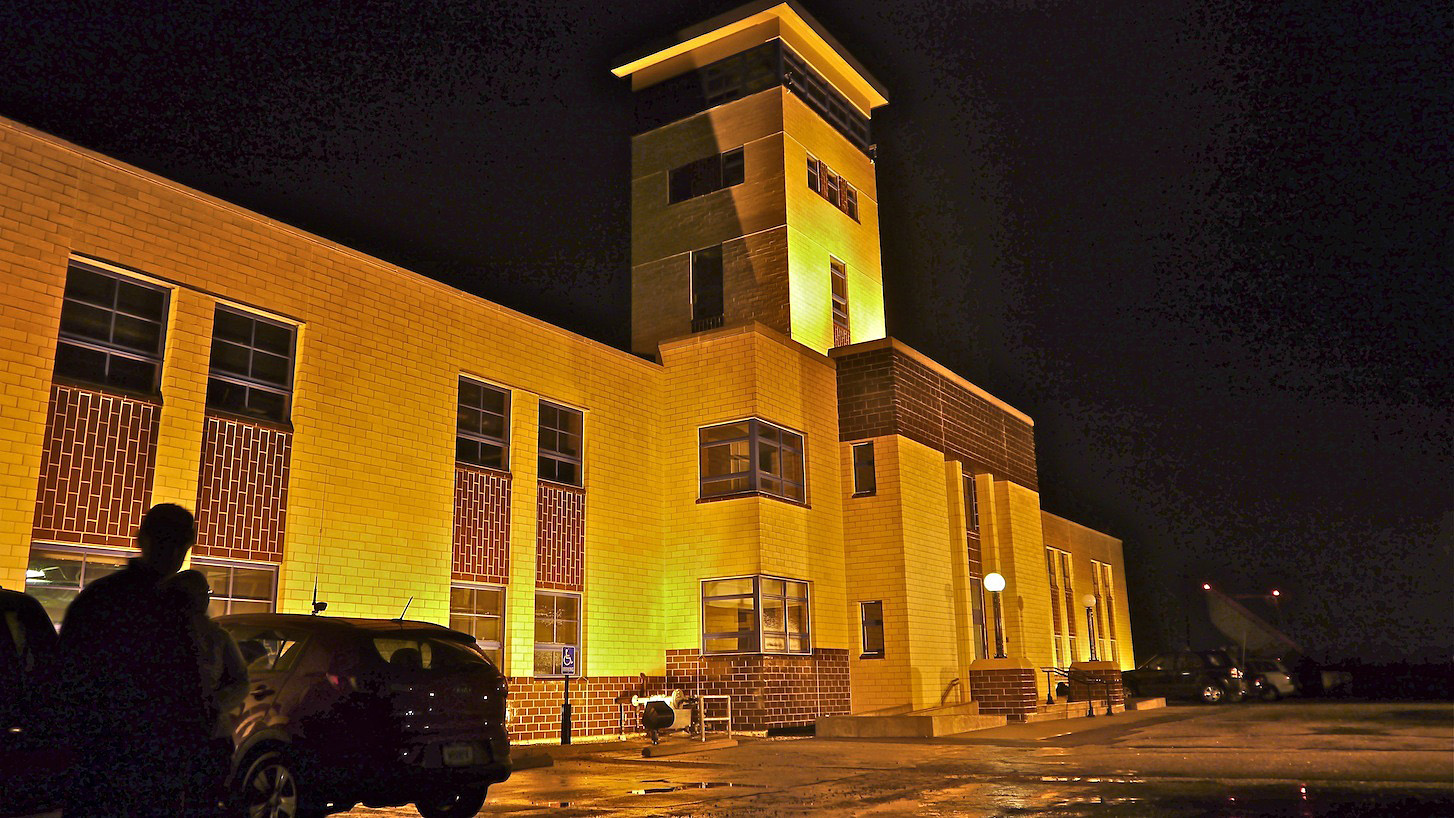

- Location within Ohio Location within the United States
- Former name: Voice of America Bethany Relay Station
- Location: 8070 Tylersville Road; West Chester, Ohio
- Coordinates: 39°21′18″N 84°21′24″W
- Website: voamuseum.org
- Voice of America Bethany Relay Station
- U.S. National Register of Historic Places
- Built: 1944
- Architectural style: Art Deco
- NRHP reference No.: 06001081
- Added to NRHP: November 28, 2006

The Voice of America Bethany Relay Station is a radio transmission station in West Chester, Ohio. Located about 25 miles (40 km) north of Cincinnati, the facility was constructed by the U.S. government during World War II to broadcast news and information to Europe and South America through its Voice of America international broadcaster. The station was decommissioned in 1994 and now operates as the National Voice of America Museum of Broadcasting.

== History ==
This facility and others were constructed after President Franklin D. Roosevelt recognized the urgent need to increase U.S. shortwave radio capacity to broadcast information overseas. Roosevelt created the Office of War Information to counter government-controlled radio programs sponsored by Hitler, Mussolini and Japanese governments that spread messages of hate and propaganda. Roosevelt and OWI rejected the use of propaganda and instead broadcast fact-based news and information.

In 1943, the United States government bought nearly all of Section 12 of Township 3, Range 2 of the Symmes Purchase, the northeasternmost section of Union Township. From Hazel Beckley, 170 acres (688,000 m^{2}) were purchased; from Philip Condon, 143 acres (579,000 m^{2}); from Lola Gray Coy, 100 acres (405,000 m^{2}); from John Miller, 69 acres (279,000 m^{2}); and from Suzie Steinman, 142 acres (575,000 m^{2}). The site was chosen for its elevation and its shallow bedrock and is today bounded by Tylersville Road on the south, Cox Road to the west, Liberty Way to the north, and Butler-Warren Road.

In the first phase of construction 23 shortwave transmitters were constructed in the USA for the VOA with programs originating from studios in New York until 1954, when VOA located its headquarters in Washington, D.C.

Bethany Construction

Located on approximately 624 acres of farmland, it provided a secure alternative for inland transmission far from the east or west coasts. At that time, transmitters operating in Massachusetts, Long Island and New Jersey were vulnerable to attack from German submarines or invading forces.

Broadcasts were powered by (6) 200,000-watt transmitters built by Crosley Broadcasting Corporation, under the supervision of R.J. Rockwell. The station and antenna field were located about one mile west of Crosley’s radio tower for WLW-AM radio station in Mason, Ohio. Construction of Bethany Station began in the summer of 1943, and the first broadcast was transmitted on September 23, 1944.

World War II Impact

Before creation of the Office of War Information, Crosley Corp. had a prior lease and broadcasting arrangement with the U.S. government in 1940, to operate radio station WLWO (WLW Overseas), broadcasting programs to South America and Europe. WLWO used specially designed (top secret) reentrant rhombic antennas to push their signal overseas.

Although WLWO provided Crosley Corp. with some familiarity with overseas broadcasts, the urgent timeline to construct Bethany Station pushed employees into new technological territory, requiring much larger and more powerful transmitters and antennas. Striving for high efficiency and better-quality sound transmission over equipment powerful enough to reach Europe, Mediterranean countries, and South Africa, all efforts would be wasted unless the listeners could receive, hear and understand the broadcasts. Under the Axis regimes, people caught listening to foreign broadcasts were imprisoned or killed, and authorities purposely jammed signals whenever possible. Eventually, Crosley employees were gratified by their efforts – its reputation for reliable, clearer transmissions over a variable schedule infuriated Adolf Hitler, who referred to the station as “those Zinzinnati Liars.”

The first broadcast aired in September 1944. By Christmastime, the six transmitters were fully operational, on six international frequencies. The same program broadcast on two frequencies, and operators could switch to new frequencies in ten minutes. Shortwaves bounce off the ionosphere, and broadcast times and frequencies were adjusted throughout the day to assure the best transmission conditions. Bethany Station rebroadcast Winston Churchill’s May 8, 1945, Victory in Europe speech over the course of several days; unlike the BBC or AFN, who did not believe they had enough power to reach Germany. Its power across a range of frequencies and rapid switching ability, changed often to avoid jamming, set it apart from other stations.

Post War

President Harry S. Truman abolished the Office of War Information in 1945. Over the years, various agencies - the State Department and U.S. Information Agency, were responsible for its operation. The Crosley Broadcasting Corporation operated the facility for the government until November 1963, when the Voice of America assumed direct control.

Due to changing technologies, transmissions shifted to satellites. The station was closed November 14, 1994, and the antenna towers brought down over the winter of 1997-1998.

Through the Federal Lands to Parks Program, the site was divided into several uses. West Chester Township acquired Bethany Station and 22 acres for historic preservation. Since closing there were several attempts to develop Bethany Station into a museum. In 2009 a group of citizens and preservationists formed a nonprofit to transform the station into a Museum.

The Museum and event space includes the original Control Room as well as exhibits showcasing how the station operated and functioned. Displays trace the region’s pioneering legacy contributing to regional and national radio and broadcasting milestones. Highlights covering the Crosley Brothers’ innovations in radio and television broadcasting, national defense, and the American consumer economy is featured, as well as a STEM lab with hands-on demonstrations.

Part in the southwest corner was sold to developers who have erected a shopping center called the Voice of America Centre.

The Miami University Voice of America Learning Center opened on the site in January 2009.

The Museum is the home of the West Chester Amateur Radio Association (WC8VOA) which has an extensive installation within the Museum.

In 2022 and 2023, the Voice of America Park hosted a large music festival called "Voices of America", in part to honor the history of the station.

== Governance ==
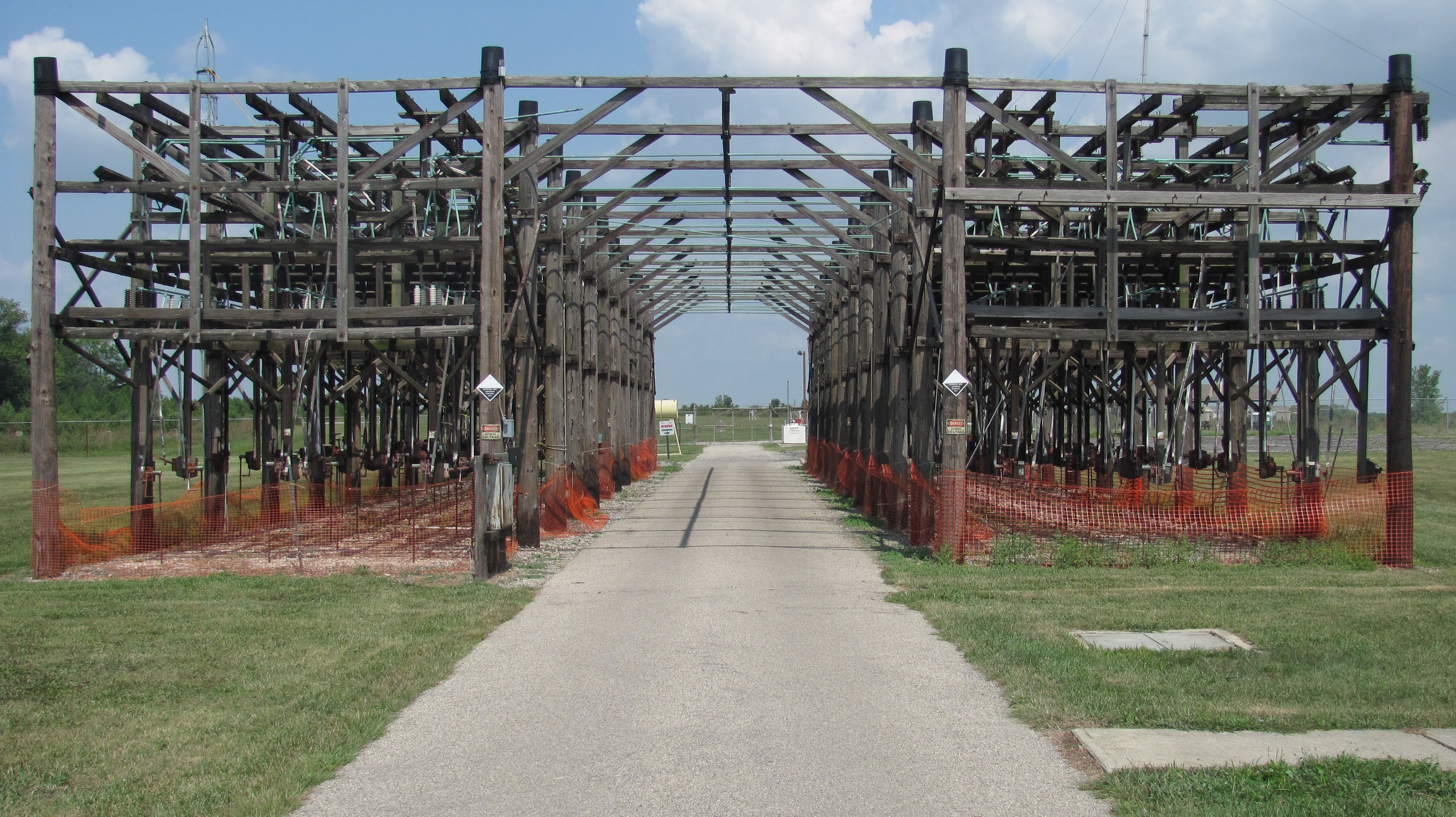
The Bethany Antenna Switching Matrix at the station.

The Museum is a non-profit 501(c)(3) organization with a volunteer Board of Directors. With a limited compensated staff, the Museum relies on volunteers for most every aspect of operation.

The facility took its name from the Liberty Township community of Bethany, which was about two miles north of the facility.

== See also ==
- USCGC Courier (WAGR-410)
