= Scipio, Indiana and Ohio =

Unincorporated community in Indiana and Ohio, US

Coordinates: 41°05′56″N 82°57′31″W

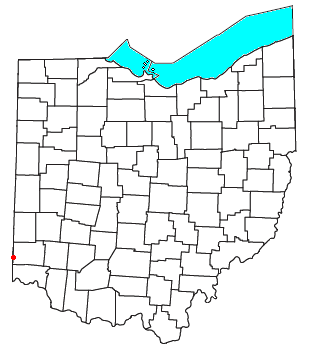
Location of Scipio, Ohio

Scipio is an unincorporated community in Franklin County, Indiana, and Butler County, Ohio, United States. It is at the intersection of State Routes 126 and 129.

== History ==
Scipio was platted in 1826.

The post office Scipio once contained had the name Philanthropy. It operated from 1836 until 1839.
