= Williamsdale, Ohio =

- Census-designated place
- Location within Ohio
- Coordinates: 39°26′31″N 84°31′47″W
- Country: United States
- State: Ohio
- County: Butler
- Township: St. Clair

Area
  - Total: 0.17 sq mi (0.45 km^{2})
  - Land: 0.17 sq mi (0.45 km^{2})
  - Water: 0 sq mi (0.00 km^{2})
- Elevation: 600 ft (180 m)

Population (2020)
  - Total: 578
  - Density: 3,318.2/sq mi (1,281.16/km^{2})
- Time zone: UTC-5 (Eastern (EST))
  - Summer (DST): UTC-4 (EDT)
- ZIP code: 45011
- Area code: 513
- FIPS code: 39-85344
- GNIS feature ID: 2584372

Williamsdale is a census-designated place (CDP) in St. Clair Township, Butler County, Ohio, United States. The population was 578 at the 2020 census.

== Geography ==
Williamsdale is located in the southern part of St. Clair Township, just north of the village of New Miami. It is in the valley of the Great Miami River but does not actually touch it.

U.S. Route 127 forms the western edge of the CDP, leading south into New Miami and thence into the city of Hamilton, and north to Eaton. The unincorporated community of Overpeck is directly to the northeast, along Hamilton Trenton Road.

According to the United States Census Bureau, Williamsdale has a total area of 0.17 square miles (0.45 km^{2}), all land.

== Demographics ==
Historical population
Census	Pop.	Note	%±
2020	578		—
U.S. Decennial Census
