= Bethany, Ohio =

Unincorporated community in Ohio, U.S.

Coordinates: 39°23′04″N 84°22′25″W

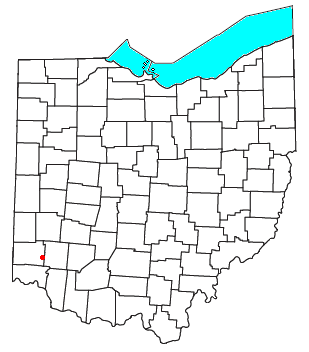
Location of Bethany, Ohio

Bethany is an unincorporated community in southeastern Liberty Township, Butler County, Ohio, United States, located in the southwestern part of Ohio. It lies about three miles south of Monroe.

Bethany was laid out in 1822 on what would become the Cincinnati and Dayton Turnpike (which was later known as the Dixie Highway), U.S. Route 25, and Cincinnati-Dayton Road. It gave its name to the Voice of America's Bethany Relay Station and to the telephone exchange which covers most of Liberty and West Chester Townships. It is served by the Middletown post office and the Lakota Local School District.
