= U.S. Route 27 in Ohio =

U.S. Route 27
- US 27 in red; US 27 directional alternate in blue

Route information
- Maintained by ODOT
- Length: 40.58 mi (65.31 km)

Major junctions
- South end: US 27 at the Kentucky state line in Cincinnati
- I-75 in Cincinnati; I-74 in Cincinnati; I-275 near Cincinnati
- North end: US 27 at the Indiana state line in College Corner

Location
- Country: United States
- State: Ohio
- Counties: Hamilton, Butler

Highway system
- United States Numbered Highway System; List; Special; Divided; Ohio State Highway System; Interstate; US; State; Scenic
← SR 26	→ SR 28

U.S. Route 27 (US 27) in Ohio runs for 40.58 miles (65.31 km) between the Kentucky and Indiana state lines: 18.5 miles (29.8 km) in Hamilton County and another 22.1 miles (35.6 km) in Butler County. The route crosses into Ohio and Downtown Cincinnati via the Taylor–Southgate Bridge over the Ohio River. US 27 follows Mehring Way, Central Avenue, Ezzard Charles Drive, and Central Parkway through Downtown Cincinnati. US 27 briefly runs concurrent with Interstate 75 (I-75), exiting at I-74 for another brief concurrency before exiting onto Colerain Road. US 27 then continues northwest eventually to Oxford and then reaches the Indiana border another six miles (9.7 km) northwest at College Corner.

== Route description ==
=== Hamilton County ===
US 27 enters Ohio on the Taylor–Southgate Bridge over the Ohio River as a four-lane highway. After the bridge ends, the highway makes a loop to the east around a parking structure on Pete Rose and Mehring ways, concurrent with US 52. Mehring Way curves towards the west and passes under the Taylor–Southgate Bridge. After the bridge, the street parallels the Ohio River and Smale Riverfront Park on the south side of the road and the Heritage Bank Center and Great American Ball Park on the north side. The street passes under the John A. Roebling Suspension Bridge and then passes to the south of Paycor Stadium.

On the southwest corner of the stadium, US 27 and US 52 turn north onto Central Avenue. Central Avenue passes on the west side of the stadium. The route continues north, passing the west side of the Duke Energy Convention Center, Cathedral Basilica of St. Peter in Chains, and Romanesque Cincinnati City Hall. At Central Avenue and West 3rd Street, US 27 and US 127 begin their concurrency. At Central Avenue and 6th Street, northbound US 27 continues north along Central Avenue whereas the southbound lanes use Central Parkway and Plum Street; both directions of travel merge back together to follow Central Parkway at Ezzard Charles Drive. US 27 and US 127 end their concurrency at Hopple Street as US 127 continues north along Central Parkway and US 27 becomes concurrent with I-75 and then I-74 for a short while.

The route then follows Colerain Avenue, ascending through the Mount Airy Forest from an elevation of 490 to 930 feet (150 to 280 m) in two miles (3.2 km), passing the Cincinnati Water Tanks on North Bend Road. The remaining stretch in Hamilton County is a quite busy multilane highway that passes through the Mount Airy neighborhood, then exits Cincinnati to briefly pass through the corner of Green Township. It then becomes the main commercial thoroughfare through Colerain Township, traveling along a broad ridge that roughly separates the watersheds of the Great Miami River to the west from that of West Fork Mill Creek to the east.

The road then splits at an intersection with Struble Road, with the old alignment of Colerain Avenue branching off, and US 27 following a modern freeway section, passing the "Mount Rumpke" landfill and descending to and crossing the Great Miami River at an elevation of 525 feet (160 m).

=== Butler County ===
A herringbone brick intersection of Chestnut Street and Patterson Avenue is at the southeast corner of Oxford at US 27. The highway northwest of Oxford is straight and rural. This final section passes to the west of the Oxford Walmart and within a mile (1.6 km) of the Butler County highpoint before reaching College Corner.

== History ==
The road between Strubble and Oxford was called the highway to heaven by 1986. There were at times at least 80 crosses along the highway. After this publicity, the road was widened, curves were straightened, and the speed limit was lowered to 45 mph (72 km/h).

== Major intersections ==
County	Location	mi	km	Destinations	Notes
Ohio River		0.00	0.00	US 27 south (York St)	Continuation into Kentucky
Ohio River		0.00	0.00	Taylor–Southgate Bridge	
Hamilton	Cincinnati	0.23	0.37	US 52 east (Pete Rose Way)	Eastern end of US 52 concurrency
Hamilton	Cincinnati	1.42	2.29	US 42 west / US 127 south	Southern end of US 42/US 127 concurrency
Hamilton	Cincinnati	1.60	2.57	US 22 west / SR 3 south / SR 264 west	Southern end of US 22 concurrency; Southern terminus of SR 3; eastern terminus of SR 264 eastbound
Hamilton	Cincinnati	1.69	2.72	SR 264 west to US 50	Westbound SR 264
Hamilton	Cincinnati	1.77	2.85	US 22 east / US 42 east / SR 3 north (Central Pkwy)	Northern end of US 22/US 42 concurrency
Hamilton	Cincinnati	4.76	7.66	I-75 south – Lexington	
Hamilton	Cincinnati	4.86	7.82	US 127 north (Central Pkwy)	Northern end of US 127 concurrency
Hamilton	Cincinnati	4.94	7.95	I-75 south – Lexington	Northbound US 27/US 52 to I-75 only; southern end of I-75 concurrency
Hamilton	Cincinnati	5.52	8.88	I-75 north / I-74 west – Dayton	Northern end of I-75 concurrency; southern end of I-74 concurrency; eastern terminus of I-74
Hamilton	Cincinnati	6.03	9.70	I-74 west / US 52 west – Indianapolis	Northern end of I-74/US 52 concurrency
Hamilton	Cincinnati	6.84– 6.90	11.01– 11.10	I-74 / US 52	
Hamilton		11.69– 11.87	18.81– 19.10	SR 126 east / Ronald Reagan Cross County Highway	Southern end of SR 126 concurrency
Hamilton		14.08	22.66	I-275 to I-74 / I-75	
Hamilton	Dunlap			Kemper Road	Interchange
Butler		19.12– 19.32	30.77– 31.09	SR 126 west / SR 128 – Ross	Interchange. Northern end of SR 126 concurrency
Butler	Millville	24.44	39.33	SR 129 west – Brookville	Southern end of SR 129 concurrency
Butler	Millville	24.73	39.80	SR 129 east – Hamilton	Northern end of SR 129 concurrency
Butler		29.00	46.67	SR 130 east – Hamilton	Western terminus of SR 130
Butler	Oxford	34.09	54.86	SR 73 east – Trenton	
Butler	Oxford	34.90	56.17	SR 732	
Butler	College Corner	40.58	65.31	US 27 north – Liberty, Richmond	Continuation into Indiana
1.000 mi = 1.609 km; 1.000 km = 0.621 mi: Concurrency terminus

U.S. Route 27
Previous state: Kentucky	Ohio	Next state: Indiana
