= Ohio State Route 126 =

State highway in Ohio, US

State Route 126

Route information
- Maintained by ODOT
- Length: 41.23 mi (66.35 km)
- Existed: 1926–present

Major junctions
- West end: SR 129 / SR 252 near Scipio
- US 27 from Ross to Mount Healthy; I-275 near Mount Healthy; US 127 in Mount Healthy; I-75 in Cincinnati; US 42 in Reading; I-71 in Montgomery; US 22 / SR 3 in Montgomery
- East end: US 50 in Milford

Location
- Country: United States
- State: Ohio
- Counties: Butler, Hamilton, Clermont

Highway system
- Ohio State Highway System; Interstate; US; State; Scenic
← SR 125	→ US 127

State Route 126 (SR 126) is a state route starting at the Indiana state line, at a split with SR 129 near Scipio, and ending east of Cincinnati at an intersection with U.S. Route 50 (US 50) in Milford. SR 126 is locally known for comprising most of Ronald Reagan Cross County Highway.

== History ==
Prior to the completion of Ronald Reagan Cross County Highway in 1997, the central portion of SR 126 between Ross and Montgomery consisted of West Kemper Road, Springfield Pike (SR 4), Glendale Milford Road, Kenwood Road, and Cooper Road. On October 28, 1997, the Ohio Department of Transportation (ODOT) took over Ronald Reagan Highway, except for the segment west of Colerain Avenue. SR 126 was rerouted over the highway, while Kemper, Glendale Milford, Kenwood, and Cooper roads were returned to local authorities.

== Major junctions ==
County	Location	mi	km	Exit	Destinations	Notes
Butler	Reily–Morgan township line	0.00– 0.02	0.00– 0.032		SR 129 east (Hamilton Scipio Road) / SR 252 west – Brookville, Millville	Western terminus; western terminus of SR 129; eastern terminus of SR 252
Butler	Morgan Township	7.66	12.33		SR 748 north (Millville Shandon Road) – Millville	Southern terminus of SR 748
Butler	Ross Township	11.46	18.44		SR 128 south (Hamilton Cleves Road) – Cleves	Western end of SR 128 concurrency
Butler	Ross Township	12.54	20.18		US 27 north / SR 128 north (Hamilton Cleves Road) – Oxford, Hamilton, Millville, Cincinnati	Interchange; eastern end of SR 128 concurrency; western end of US 27 concurrency
Butler	Ross Township	12.54	20.18	West end of expressway		
Hamilton	Colerain Township	13.27	21.36	—	East Miami River Road – Fairfield	Grade-separated single-loop intersections
Hamilton	Colerain Township	14.82	23.85	—	Kemper Road	Grade-separated single-loop intersections
Hamilton	Colerain Township	17.56	28.26	East end of expressway		
Hamilton	Colerain Township	17.56	28.26		I-275 to I-74 / I-75 – Indianapolis, Dayton	Exit 33 on I-275
Hamilton	Colerain Township	19.75– 19.92	31.78– 32.06		US 27 south (Colerain Avenue) / Ronald Reagan Cross County Highway west	Interchange; eastern end of US 27 concurrency; exit 20 on Ronald Reagan Cross County Hwy.
Hamilton	Colerain Township	19.75– 19.92	31.78– 32.06	West end of freeway		
Hamilton	Mount Healthy–North College Hill line	22.13	35.61	22	US 127 (Hamilton Avenue) – Mount Healthy, North College Hill	
Hamilton	Finneytown	23.90	38.46	24A–B	Winton Road	Westbound exit and eastbound entrance only; signed as exits 24A (south) and 24B (north)
Hamilton	Finneytown	24.58	39.56	25	Galbraith Road / Winton Road	Winton Road signed westbound only
Hamilton	Cincinnati	26.68– 27.06	42.94– 43.55	27	I-75 – Cincinnati, Dayton	Signed as exits 27A (south) and 27B (north) eastbound; exit 10A on I-75; no access from I-75 southbound, from westbound SR 126 to I-75 northbound
Hamilton	Reading	28.10	45.22	28	US 42 (Reading Road) / Galbraith Road	Eastbound exit and westbound entrance only
Hamilton	Reading	28.52	45.90	28	To US 42 (Reading Road) / I-75 north / Galbraith Road	Westbound exit and eastbound entrance only
Hamilton	Amberley	29.39	47.30	29	Ridge Road	
Hamilton	Blue Ash	31.27	50.32	31	Plainfield Road / Hunt Road	
Hamilton	Blue Ash	31.91– 32.15	51.35– 51.74	32A	Blue Ash Road / Kenwood Road	
Hamilton	Montgomery–Sycamore Township line			East end of Ronald Reagan Cross County Highway; east end of freeway		
Hamilton	Montgomery–Sycamore Township line	32.73	52.67	32B–C	I-71 – Cincinnati, Columbus	Interchange; signed as exits 32B (south) and 32B (north) eastbound; no exit numbers westbound; exit 14 on I-71
Hamilton	Montgomery	33.34	53.66		US 22 west / SR 3 south (Montgomery Road south)	Roundabout; western end of US 22/SR 3 concurrency
Hamilton	Montgomery	33.99	54.70		US 22 east / SR 3 north (Montgomery Road north)	Eastern end of US 22/SR 3 concurrency
Clermont	No major junctions					
Hamilton	Milford	41.23	66.35		US 50	Eastern terminus
1.000 mi = 1.609 km; 1.000 km = 0.621 mi: Concurrency terminus; Incomplete access
