= Fairhaven, Ohio =

Unincorporated community in Ohio, U.S.

Coordinates: 39°38′20″N 84°46′18″W

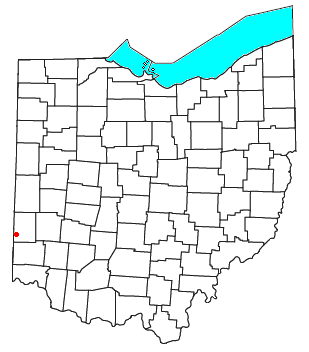
Location of Fairhaven, Ohio

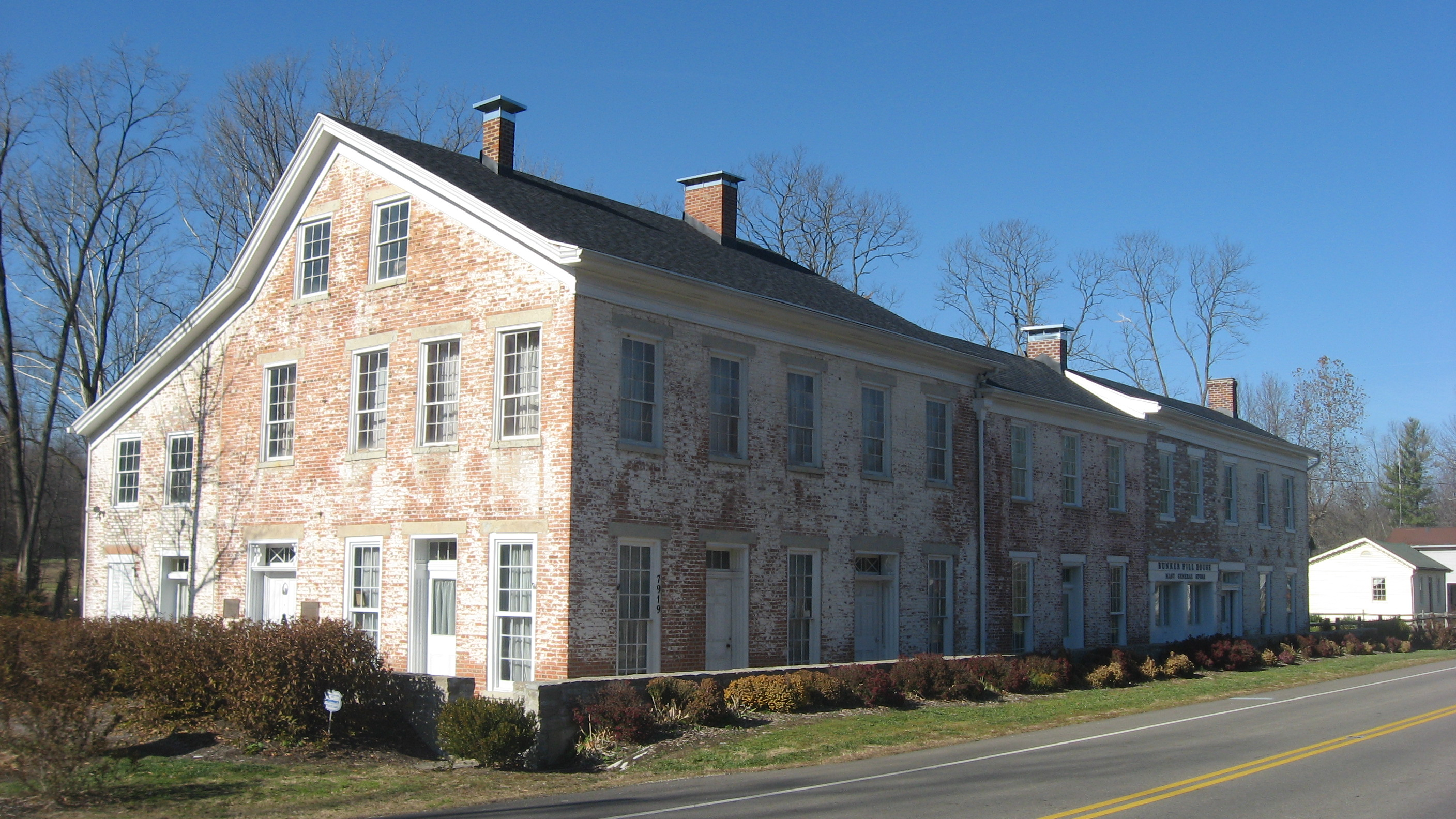
Bunker Hill House on State Route 177

Fairhaven is an unincorporated community in eastern Israel Township, Preble County, Ohio, United States. It lies along State Route 177 at its intersection with Israel-Somers Road. Four Mile Creek, which feeds into Acton Lake in southern Preble County, runs on the western edge of Fairhaven. It is located 10½ miles (17 kilometers) southwest of Eaton, the county seat of Preble County. The community is part of the Dayton Metropolitan Statistical Area. Fairhaven Church and Fairhaven Community Church are both located in Fairhaven along State Route 177. Fairhaven Community Church hosts a free annual Dinner Drama for the community. Fairhaven is home to the historic Bunker Hill house, a stop along the Underground Railroad.

== History ==
Fairhaven was laid out and platted in 1832. Fairhaven is a commendatory name for the scenic location of the original town site. A post office was established at Fairhaven in 1833 and remained in operation until 1932.
