= Reily Township, Butler County, Ohio =

Township in Ohio, US

- Township
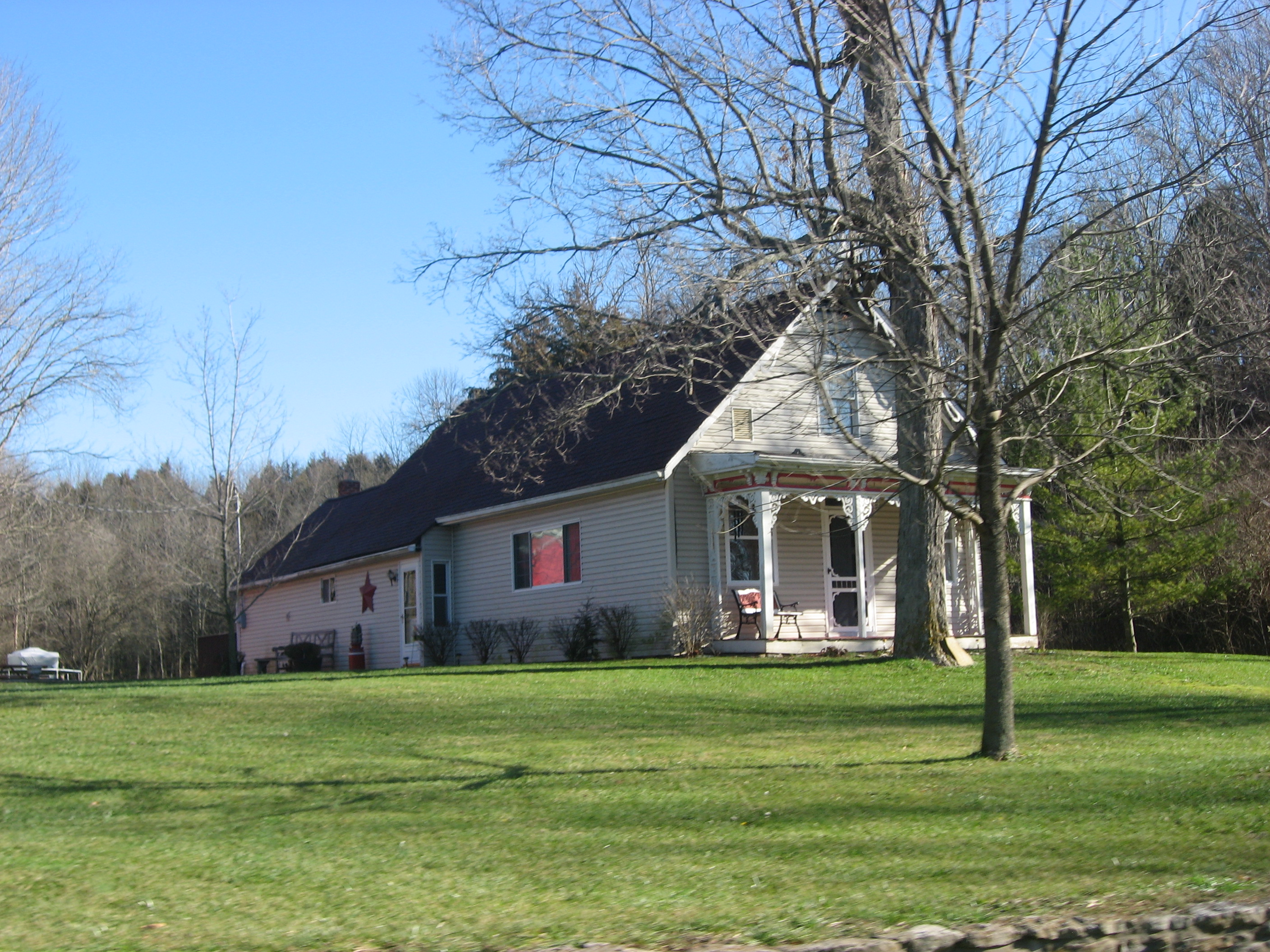
- James P. Hidley Cottage, built 1860

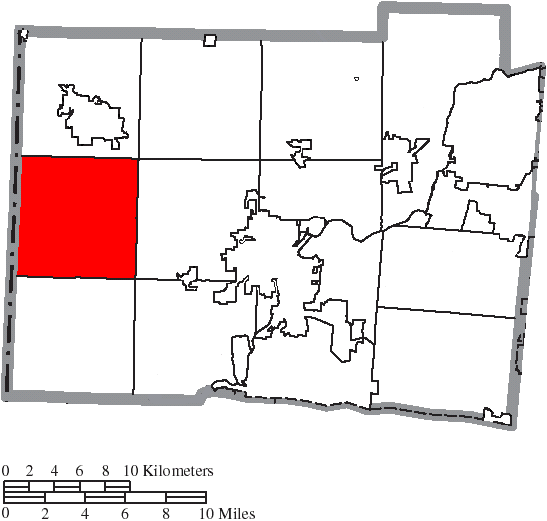
- Location of Reily Township in Butler County
- Coordinates: 39°26′18″N 84°45′16″W
- Country: United States
- State: Ohio
- County: Butler

Area
  - Total: 36.7 sq mi (95.0 km^{2})
  - Land: 36.7 sq mi (95.0 km^{2})
  - Water: 0 sq mi (0.0 km^{2})
- Elevation: 879 ft (268 m)

Population (2020)
  - Total: 2,660
  - Density: 71/sq mi (27.6/km^{2})
- Time zone: UTC-5 (Eastern (EST))
  - Summer (DST): UTC-4 (EDT)
- ZIP code: 45056
- Area code: 513
- FIPS code: 39-66096
- GNIS feature ID: 1085818
- Website: https://www.reilytownship.org/

Reily Township is one of thirteen townships in Butler County, Ohio, United States. It is located in the west-central part of the county. It had a population of 2,660 at the 2020 census.

== History ==
It was the eighth in order of creation, erected from St. Clair Township by the Butler County Commissioners on December 7, 1807, with these boundaries.

The first election of township officers was at Henry Burget's home on January 2, 1808.

== Geography ==
Located in the western part of the county, it borders the following townships:

- Oxford Township - north
- Milford Township - northeast corner
- Hanover Township - east
- Ross Township - southeast corner
- Morgan Township - south
- Whitewater Township, Franklin County, Indiana - southwest corner
- Springfield Township, Franklin County, Indiana - west
- Bath Township, Franklin County, Indiana - northwest corner

=== Name ===
The only Reily Township statewide, it is named for John Reily (1763–1850), the former Clerk of the Northwest Territory and the first Butler County clerk of courts.

== Government ==
The township is governed by a three-member board of trustees, who are elected in November of odd-numbered years to a four-year term beginning on the following January 1. Two are elected in the year after the presidential election and one is elected in the year before it. There is also an elected township fiscal officer, who serves a four-year term beginning on April 1 of the year after the election, which is held in November of the year before the presidential election. Vacancies in the fiscal officership or on the board of trustees are filled by the remaining trustees.

== Public services ==
The township is in the Talawanda City School District.

Major highways include U.S. Route 27, the road between Cincinnati, Ohio, and Richmond, Indiana; State Route 129, which travels from Hamilton, Ohio, to the Indiana border; and State Route 732.
