= Ohio State Route 128 =

State highway in Ohio, US

State Route 128

Route information
- Maintained by ODOT
- Length: 22.53 mi (36.26 km)
- Existed: 1923–present

Major junctions
- South end: US 50 in Cleves
- I-74 / I-275 / US 52 in Miamitown; US 27 / SR 126 in Ross
- North end: US 127 in Hamilton

Location
- Country: United States
- State: Ohio
- Counties: Hamilton, Butler

Highway system
- Ohio State Highway System; Interstate; US; State; Scenic
← SR 127	→ SR 129

State Route 128 (SR 128) is a 22.5-mile-long (36.2 km) state route that runs between Cleves and Hamilton in the US state of Ohio. Most of the route is a rural two-lane highway and passes through both woodland and farmland. For much of its path, SR 128 runs generally parallel to the west of the Great Miami River. The highway was first signed in 1923 on the same alignment as today. The whole highway was paved by 1928. US 50 Bypass was commissioned on a section of SR 128 in 1935 and it was decommissioned in 1974.

== Route description ==
SR 128 begins at an intersection with U.S. Route 50 (US 50), in Cleves, on the west bank of the Great Miami River. The highway heads north as a two-lane highway passing through woodland and parallel to the river. The road curves northeast, before curving southeast, passing through commercial properties. The route curves northeast and has an interchange with Interstate 74 (I–74) and I–275. North of the interchange SR 128 curves due north passing through Miamitown. The highway curves northwest before leaving the town. The route heads northwest passing through a mix of farmland and woodland. The roadway enters Ross and begins a concurrency with SR 126. The concurrency passes through residential properties, with some commercial properties.

On the northeast side of Ross the road has an interchange with US 27, this interchange is the eastern end of SR 126 concurrency. The routes leaves Ross passing through woodland and farmland. The highway curves due north heading towards Hamilton. As the road enters Hamilton it passes through residential properties, before turning due east, crossing over the Great Miami River on the Columbia Bridge. After crossing the river the highway heads into another residential neighborhood along Pershing Avenue. The highway ends at US 127.

SR 128 is not part of the National Highway System, a system of routes important to the nation's economy, mobility and defense.

== History ==
SR 128 was first signed in 1923 and the entire route was paved in 1928. In 1935 US 50 Bypass was signed concurrent with SR 128 from US 50 north to US 27. The US 50 Bypass was decommissioned in 1974. SR 128 formerly extended 0.38 miles (0.61 km) north along US 127 in Hamilton then east along High Street for 0.59 miles (0.95 km) to end at SR 4, SR 129, and SR 177. By 2007, the terminus had been truncated to the intersection of US 127 and SR 129/SR 177 and by 2013, its current northern terminus.

== Major intersections ==
County	Location	mi	km	Destinations	Notes
Hamilton	Cleves	0.00	0.00	US 50 / Valley Junction Road	Southern terminus of SR 128
Hamilton	Miamitown	4.90– 5.14	7.89– 8.27	I-74 / I-275 / US 52 – Cincinnati, Indianapolis	Exit 7 (I-74)
Butler	Ross	13.95	22.45	SR 126 west (Cincinnati Brookville Road) – Brookville	Western end of SR 126 concurrency
Butler	Ross	14.82– 14.93	23.85– 24.03	US 27 / SR 126 east to I-275 – Cincinnati, Oxford	Interchange; eastern end of SR 126 concurrency
Butler	Hamilton	22.53	36.26	US 127 (Martin Luther King Jr. Boulevard) to SR 129 / I-75	Northern terminus
1.000 mi = 1.609 km; 1.000 km = 0.621 mi: Concurrency terminus
