= Interstate 74 in Ohio =

Highway in Hamilton County, Ohio, United States

Interstate 74
- I-74 highlighted in red

Route information
- Maintained by ODOT
- Length: 19.47 mi (31.33 km)
- NHS: Entire route

Major junctions
- West end: I-74 at the Indiana state line in Harrison
- I-275 near Cincinnati; US 27 in Cincinnati
- East end: I-75 / US 52 in Cincinnati

Location
- Country: United States
- State: Ohio
- Counties: Hamilton

Highway system
- Interstate Highway System; Main; Auxiliary; Suffixed; Business; Future; Ohio State Highway System; Interstate; US; State; Scenic
← SR 73	→ SR 74

Interstate 74 (I-74) in the US state of Ohio runs for 19.47 miles (31.33 km) southeast from the Indiana border to the western segment's current eastern terminus at I-75 just north of Downtown Cincinnati. It is also signed with U.S. Route 52 (US 52) for its entire length.

== Route description ==
The Ohio portion of I-74 begins on the Indiana border near Harrison and travels east. Shortly after crossing into Ohio, the Interstate curves southeast before it intersects with I-275 near milepost 5. It then overlaps with that beltway route, heading generally east for approximately four miles (6.4 km) before splitting from I-275 to continue southeast into Cincinnati. Approximately 10 miles (16 km) later, I-74 reaches its eastern terminus at I-75, about four miles (6.4 km) north-northwest of Downtown Cincinnati.

== History ==
I-74 was completed in the Cincinnati area by 1974, when the intersection with I-75 was completed. By the 2010s, this intersection had become inadequate. Construction started on reconfiguring the I-74/I-75 interchange in 2018, with construction expected to be complete by 2025.

== Future ==
Proposals call for I-74 to be continued through Ohio and into West Virginia, concurrent with I-73; with both of these roads continuing through Virginia and North Carolina to end in Myrtle Beach, South Carolina. Due to funding concerns, there have historically been no concrete plans for this to occur, although the Ohio House of Representatives approved a resolution urging for the completion of both I-73 and I-74 in 2022.

Several plans are in the running for the extension through the Cincinnati metropolitan area. They include:

1. Running along I-75 to the interchange at I-275, then onto State Route 32 (SR 32);
2. Along I-75 between the I-74/I-75 interchange and I-75/SR 562 interchange, then onto SR 562, then to the interchange at I-71/SR 562, then to the I-71/Red Bank corridor interchange, down the Red Bank corridor, and then finally along a new highway connector to SR 32; and
3. From the I-74/I-75 interchange to I-75/SR 562 interchange, then onto SR 562, then on through the I-71/SR 562 interchange, and then finally to the I-71/I-275 interchange before connecting to SR 32.

The second route was eliminated due to opposition regarding a key part of its completion: a $366.2-million highway that would need to be constructed near Mariemont and Newtown (terminuses: Red Bank Road/Wooster Pike intersection and Bells Lane). Total costs would have been $809.1 million ($62 million per mile ($39 million/km)). Improvements to existing roads have been proposed instead.

The Norwood Lateral (SR 562) would need to be reconstructed in order to become part of I-74. Here are the possible and/or most likely needs: a third travel lane in each direction (two each way currently), overpasses requiring more vertical clearance (16 feet (4.9 m) minimum), upgraded ramp extensions at interchanges (1,200 feet (370 m)), and shoulders of more width. There are highways with shoulder widths of four and eight feet (1.2 and 2.4 m), however; so this might not be a serious issue. This problem could be resolved through Congress if they wanted to designate the Norwood Lateral as a future segment of the Interstate Highway System.

== Exit list ==
The entire route is in Hamilton County.

Location	mi	km	Exit	Destinations	Notes
Harrison	0.00	0.00		I-74 west / US 52 west – Indianapolis	Indiana state line
Harrison	1.60	2.57	1	New Haven Road – Harrison	
Harrison	3.58	5.76	3	Dry Fork Road	
Whitewater Township	5.85	9.41	5	I-275 south – Kentucky	West end of I-275 overlap; I-275 exit 25
Whitewater Township	7.76	12.49	7	SR 128 – Cleves, Hamilton, Miamitown	
Colerain Township	9.33	15.02	9	I-275 north to I-75 – Dayton	East end of I-275 overlap; I-275 exit 28
Green Township	11.16	17.96	11	Rybolt Road, Harrison Pike	
Green Township	14.66	23.59	14	North Bend Road – Cheviot	
Cincinnati	17.44	28.07	17	Montana Avenue	Westbound exit and eastbound entrance
Cincinnati	18.40– 18.52	29.61– 29.81	18	US 27 north (Beekman Street) / Colerain Avenue	No direct access from I-74 west to Beekman Street south or from Beekman Street north to I-74 east, however, a legal U-turn allows both of these accesses to be achieved.
Cincinnati	19.08	30.71	19	Elmore Street, Spring Grove Avenue	Former westbound exit and eastbound entrance to I-75 south; closed 2013
Cincinnati	19.47	31.33		I-75 / US 27 south / US 52 east – Dayton, Lexington	I-75 exit 4; US 27 and US 52 overlaps end east; Unsigned US 27
Cincinnati	19.47	31.33	20	US 27 / US 127 south – Central Parkway	Former eastern end of US 27 overlap; closed 2013
1.000 mi = 1.609 km; 1.000 km = 0.621 mi: Closed/former; Concurrency terminus; Incomplete access

Interstate 74
Previous state: Indiana	Ohio	Next state: West Virginia
