= U.S. Route 127 in Ohio =

Segment of American highway

U.S. Route 127
- Route of US 127 in Ohio highlighted in red

Route information
- Auxiliary route of US 27
- Maintained by ODOT
- Length: 194.27 mi (312.65 km)
- Existed: 1926–present

Major junctions
- South end: US 25 / US 42 / US 127 at the Kentucky state line in Cincinnati
- US 27 in Cincinnati; I-275 in Springfield Township; US 35 in Eaton; I-70 in Monroe Township; US 36 near Greenville; US 33 near Celina; US 30 / US 224 near Van Wert; US 24 near Paulding; US 6 near Bryan; US 20 in Fayette
- North end: US 127 near Waldron, MI

Location
- Country: United States
- State: Ohio
- Counties: Hamilton, Butler, Preble, Darke, Mercer, Van Wert, Paulding, Defiance, Williams, Fulton

Highway system
- United States Numbered Highway System; List; Special; Divided; Ohio State Highway System; Interstate; US; State; Scenic
← SR 126	→ SR 127

US Highway 127 (US 127) is a part of the United States Numbered Highway System that runs from Chattanooga, Tennessee, to the Lower Peninsula of Michigan. In Ohio, the highway runs 194.27 miles (312.65 km) from the Ohio River in Cincinnati to the Michigan state line north of West Unity. US 127 runs south to north in Ohio's westernmost counties along the border of Indiana. The highway is a main route connecting many small towns, including eight county seats. The highway was first designated in 1926. Its route ended in downtown Toledo before being realigned to its current route in 1930.

== Route description ==
=== Hamilton County ===
US 127 enters Ohio from the Kentucky via the Clay Wade Bailey Bridge, which also carries US 42 and US 25 north across the Ohio River into Cincinnati. Upon entering Ohio, US 25 ends, and US 127/US 42 continues through Downtown east for one block on Third Street, and then north one block on Central Avenue. At this point, the route becomes a one-way pair, with the northbound route using Fifth Street and Elm Street, and the southbound route using Sixth Street and Plum Street. Both streets intersect Central Parkway, and US 127 follows the roadway north while US 42 instead heads east on the parkway.

As US 127 continues north, it passes one block west of Washington Park and Findlay Market in Over-the-Rhine and marks the neighborhood's western boundary. Upon passing the eastern end of the Western Hills Viaduct, the roadway closely parallels Interstate 75 (I-75) for nearly two miles (3.2 km).

US 127 then turns onto the Ludlow Viaduct over Mill Creek near the junction of I-75 and I-74; it becomes Hamilton Avenue at its end. At this point, US 127 becomes a predominantly four-lane surface street. As Hamilton Avenue, US 127 is the major north–south artery and commercial corridor in Cincinnati's Northside and College Hill neighborhoods, and then the inner suburban cities of North College Hill and Mt. Healthy. There is an interchange with I-275 just before it crosses into Butler County.

=== Rest of Ohio ===
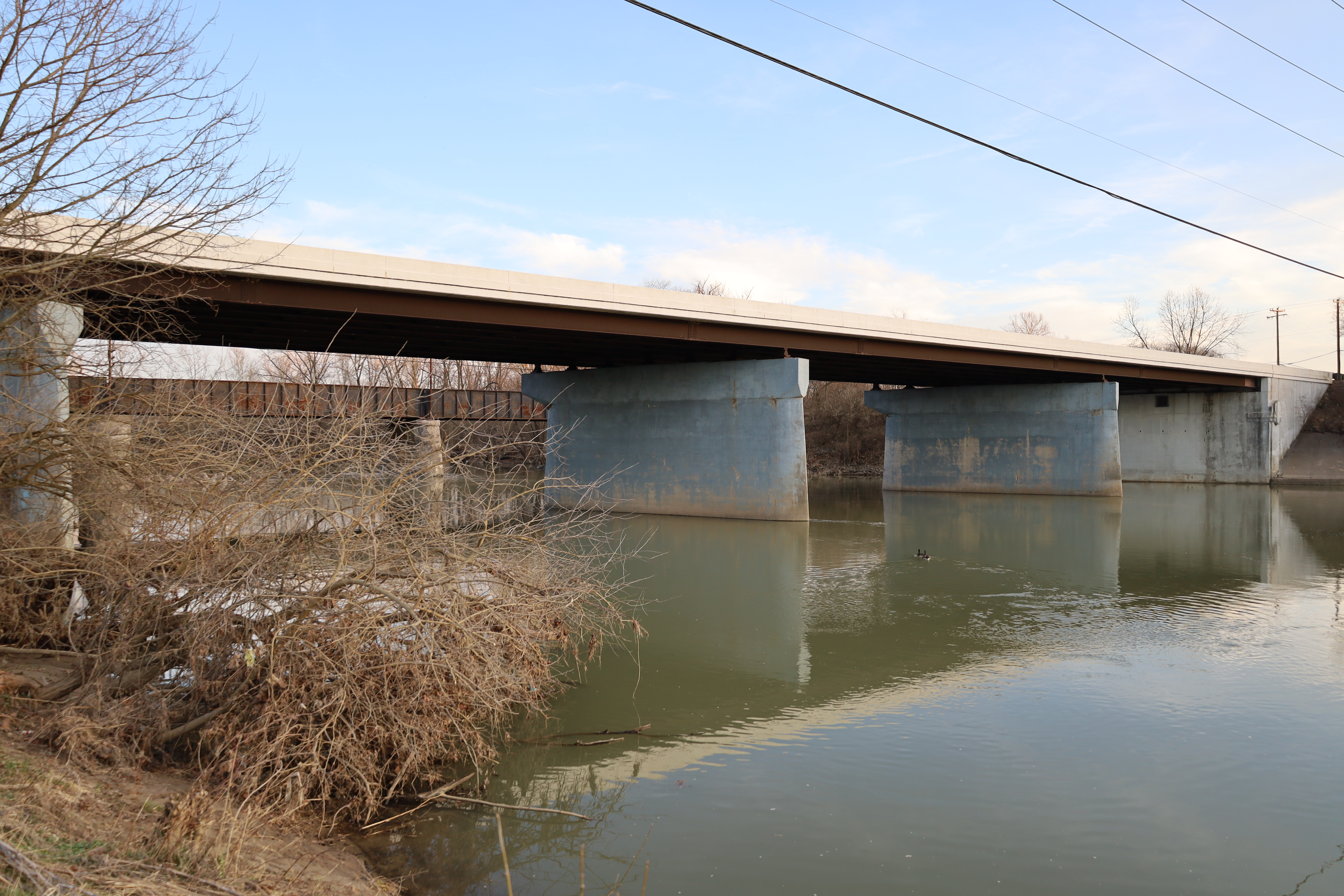
The road crosses the Great Miami River in New Miami, Ohio

US 127 passes through Fairfield then reaches downtown Hamilton. In Hamilton, US 127 widens to a four-lane road just south of downtown before returning to a two-lane road at the northern edge of New Miami. From this point, US 127 roughly parallels Sevenmile Creek until it reaches Eaton.

Approximately seven miles (11 km) north of Eaton, US 127 intersects I-70 and US 40 (National Road) and proceeds to Greenville. Along this section of the route US 127 is a two-lane rural highway surrounded by farms. Approaching Greenville, the road widens to a four-lane limited access highway, serving as a bypass to the east of the city.

The road returns to a rural two-lane road and continues north to Celina, skirting the western edge of Grand Lake St. Marys and the associated state park. US 127 serves as Main Street in Celina, the county seat of Mercer County. Just north of Celina, the highway intersects US 33, which connects Ft. Wayne, Indiana, with Columbus, and then US 127 continues to Van Wert.

In Van Wert, US 127 is Washington Street and serves as the main road through the city's business district. The Lincoln Highway intersects US 127 one block west of the county courthouse. In the northern part of the city, US 127 has a partial cloverleaf interchange with US 30 and US 224. US 224 joins US 127 and continues north briefly before US 224 turns to the east and US 127 continues due north toward Paulding.

In Paulding, US 127 bends to the northwest to cross Flatrock Creek before reaching the courthouse and turning back to the north on Williams Street. North of the city, and just south of the Maumee River, the highway intersects US 24, a limited-access highway between Toledo, Ohio and Fort Wayne, at a diamond interchange before crossing the river.

US 127 intersects US 6, the Grand Army of the Republic Highway and with State Route 15 (SR 15) becomes Main Street in Bryan. At the northern city limit, SR 15 continues north to the Ohio Turnpike while US 127 begins a northeast route toward West Unity. After passing under the turnpike, US 127 has a brief concurrency with US 20 and then enters Michigan to the north in rural Lenawee County.

== History ==
By 1912, the current US 127 corridor in Ohio existed as a series of inter-county highways running from Cincinnati to Michigan. By 1917, significant sections of the route was paved, especially near the county seats and the section from Eaton to Hamilton. In 1923, state highways were numbered and signed for the first time in Ohio. The current US 127 route was designated SR 9 from Cincinnati to Bryan and SR 108 from Bryan to the Michigan state line.

The United States Numbered Highway System was introduced in 1926. US 127 was designated to run from US 27 in Jackson, Michigan, to downtown Toledo via Monroe Street, and was later designated SR 51. Four years later, the route of US 127 was changed to reach Cincinnati. The original highway was re-numbered US 223. The new route for US 127 would move to its current alignment from along former SR 9 and former SR 108. At this time, SR 9 from Bryan to the Michigan state line became part of SR 15. The route remains mostly unchanged since 1930. US 127 still serves as a main surface street in the towns along its route, which includes eight county seats.

== Future ==
From 2011 to 2015, there had been 45 vehicle accidents, and from 2011 to 2016, three fatalities at the intersection of US 127 and Kruckeberg Road in Greenville Township, Darke County, along Greenville's bypass. After public calls for intersection improvements, the Ohio Department of Transportation (ODOT) offered six options at a public meeting on January 24, 2017. On June 15, 2017, ODOT announced that the intersection would be converted to a (standard) restricted crossing U-turn (RCUT, also known as a superstreet), but termed by ODOT as a "partial RCUT", at a cost of just over $748,000, with construction slated to begin in summer 2019. A superstreet already exists along the SR 4 Bypass in nearby Butler County.

There is a $2.4 million project north of the city of Van Wert to replace the current intersection of US 127, US 224 and Marsh Road (County Road 13) with a roundabout. The project began in January 2022 and is expected to be complete in October.

== Major intersections ==
County	Location	mi	km	Destinations	Notes
Hamilton	Cincinnati	0.00	0.00	US 127 south / US 42 south / US 25 south (Clay Wade Bailey Bridge)	Continuation into Kentucky; northern terminus of US 25
Hamilton	Cincinnati	0.47	0.76	US 27 / US 42	Northern end of US 42 concurrency; southern end of US 27 concurrency
Hamilton	Cincinnati	0.64	1.03	US 22 / US 27 / SR 264	Northern end of US 27 concurrency; southern end of US 22 concurrency
Hamilton	Cincinnati	0.81	1.30	US 22 / US 27	Northern end of US 22 concurrency; southern end of US 27 concurrency
Hamilton	Cincinnati	3.93	6.32	US 27	Northern end of US 27 concurrency
Hamilton	North College Hill	10.23	16.46	SR 126 (Ronald Reagan Cross County Highway)	Interchange is also in Mt. Healthy
Hamilton	Springfield Township	14.54	23.40	I-275	I-275 exit 36
Butler	Hamilton	22.18	35.70	SR 128 / Pershing Avenue	Western terminus of SR 128
Butler	Hamilton	22.56	36.31	SR 129 / High Street	
Butler	Seven Mile	28.88	46.48	SR 503 / West Elkton Road	Southern terminus of SR 503
Butler	Wayne Township	30.16	48.54	SR 73 / Trenton Oxford Road	Southern end of SR 73 concurrency
Butler	Milford Township	32.73	52.67	SR 73 / Oxford Trenton Road	Northern end of SR 73 concurrency
Preble	Somers Township	37.59	60.50	SR 744 / Oxford Germantown Road	Western terminus of SR 744
Preble	Camden	47.23	76.01	SR 725 / Central Avenue	
Preble	Eaton	49.77	80.10	SR 732 / Hillcrest Drive	Northern terminus of SR 732
Preble	Eaton	50.15	80.71	US 35 / Main Street	
Preble	Washington Township	53.08	85.42	SR 726	Southern terminus of SR 726
Preble	Monroe Township	56.53	90.98	I-70	I-70 exit 10
Preble	Monroe Township	57.42	92.41	US 40 (National Road)	
Darke	Castine	63.16	101.65	SR 722	
Darke	Butler Township	68.11	109.61	SR 503	
Darke	Neave Township	71.85	115.63	US 36	Southern end of US 36 concurrency
Darke	Greenville	75.32	121.22	US 36	Northern end of US 36 concurrency
Darke	Greenville	77.14	124.14	SR 121	
Darke	York Township	84.32	135.70	SR 47	
Darke	York Township	87.31	140.51	SR 185	
Darke	Wabash Township	92.30	148.54	SR 705	
Mercer	Marion Township	97.01	156.12	SR 119	
Mercer	Marion Township	99.04	159.39	SR 274	
Mercer	Butler Township	102.28	164.60	SR 219	
Mercer	Butler Township	103.35	166.33	SR 703	Southern end of SR 703 concurrency
Mercer	Celina	106.72	171.75	SR 29	Southern end of SR 29 concurrency
Mercer	Celina	106.94	172.10	SR 29 / SR 703	Northern end of SR 29/SR 703 concurrency
Mercer	Celina	107.21	172.54	SR 197	
Mercer	Dublin Township	114.14	183.69	US 33 / SR 707	Southern end of SR 707 concurrency
Mercer	Dublin Township	115.41	185.73	SR 707	Northern end of SR 707 concurrency
Mercer	Dublin Township	118.43	190.59	SR 117	
Van Wert	Liberty Township	120.43	193.81	SR 81	
Van Wert	Liberty Township	122.94	197.85	SR 709	
Van Wert	Van Wert	127.97	205.95	SR 116	
Van Wert	Van Wert	129.30	208.09	SR 118	
Van Wert	Van Wert	130.29	209.68	US 30 / US 224	Southern end of US 224 concurrency
Van Wert	Pleasant–Ridge township line	131.65	211.87	US 224; Marsh Road (CR 13)	Northern end of US 224 concurrency; intersection; scheduled for conversion to roundabout October 2022
Paulding	Blue Creek Township	139.83	225.03	SR 114	
Paulding	Jackson Township	144.84	233.10	SR 613	
Paulding	Paulding	148.29	238.65	SR 111	Southern end of SR 111 concurrency
Paulding	Crane Township	152.17	244.89	SR 111	Northern end of SR 111 concurrency
Paulding	Crane Township	153.90	247.68	US 24	
Defiance	Sherwood	159.88	257.30	SR 18	
Defiance	Washington Township	165.90	266.99	SR 249	
Williams	Pulaski Township	169.10	272.14	SR 15	Southern end of SR 15 concurrency
Williams	Pulaski Township	170.00	273.59	US 6 / SR 2	Southern end of SR 2 concurrency
Williams	Bryan	172.27	277.24	SR 2 / SR 34	Northern end of SR 2 concurrency
Williams	Pulaski Township	173.04	278.48	SR 15	Southern end of SR 15 concurrency
Williams	West Unity	183.29	294.98	US 20A	Southern end of US 20A concurrency
Williams	West Unity	183.49	295.30	US 20A	Northern end of US 20A concurrency
Williams	Mill Creek Township	189.20	304.49	US 20 west	Southern end of US 20 concurrency
Fulton	Gorham Township	191.92	308.87	US 20 east – Toledo	Northern end of US 20 concurrency
Fulton	Gorham Township	194.27	312.65	US 127 north – Jackson	Continuation into Michigan
1.000 mi = 1.609 km; 1.000 km = 0.621 mi: Concurrency terminus

U.S. Route 127
Previous state: Kentucky	Ohio	Next state: Michigan
