= Ohio State Route 177 =

State highway in southwestern Ohio, US

State Route 177

Route information
- Maintained by ODOT
- Length: 25.17 mi (40.51 km)
- Existed: 1938–present

Major junctions
- South end: SR 4 / SR 129 in Hamilton
- US 127 in Hamilton
- North end: SR 227 near Fairhaven

Location
- Country: United States
- State: Ohio
- Counties: Butler, Preble

Highway system
- Ohio State Highway System; Interstate; US; State; Scenic
← SR 176	→ SR 178
← US 224	→ SR 225

State Route 177 (SR 177) is a north–south state highway located in the southwest corner of the U.S. state of Ohio. The southern terminus of State Route 177 is at the signalized junction of State Route 4 and State Route 129 in Hamilton, after State Route 177 runs concurrently with State Route 129 for its southernmost 1.59 miles (2.56 km). The northern terminus of State Route 177 is at the Indiana State Line approximately 3.75 miles (6.04 km) northwest of the unincorporated community of Fairhaven. From this point, State Route 177 continues into Indiana as Indiana State Road 227.

== Route Description ==
State Route 177 runs northwesterly through Butler and Preble Counties. No segment of the highway is included within the National Highway System. State Route 177 is a two-lane highway, that goes through farm land mostly. The speed limit is 55 mph in most sections of the highway, slowing down for small towns.

== History ==
State Route 177 was first designated in 1934 along its current alignment, replacing what was previously designated as State Route 224. The re-designation came as a result of the debut of U.S. Route 224 in Ohio that year, and the state's practice of not duplicating a state route designation for a U.S. highway designation. No changes have taken place to the routing of State Route 177 since it was established.

== Major Intersections ==
County	Location	mi	km	Destinations	Notes
Butler	Hamilton	0.00	0.00	SR 4 (Erie Boulevard) / SR 129 east (High Street)	Southern end of SR 129 concurrency
Butler	Hamilton	0.59	0.95	US 127 / SR 128 south (Martin Luther King Boulevard)	Northern terminus of SR 128
Butler	Hamilton	1.59	2.56	SR 129 west (Milleville Avenue) / Eaton Avenue	Northern end or SR 129 concurrency
Butler	Hamilton	3.69	5.94	SR 130 west (Old Oxford Road)	Eastern terminus of SR 130
Butler	Milford Township	10.27	16.53	SR 73 (Oxford-Trenton Road) – Oxford, Miami University, Middletown	
Preble	Israel Township	15.70	25.27	SR 732 south / Oxford-Germantown Road – Oxford	Southern end of SR 732 concurrency
Preble	Israel Township	18.23	29.34	SR 732 north – Eaton	Northern end of SR 732 concurrency
Preble	Israel Township	20.42	32.86	SR 725 – Liberty, Camden	
Preble	Dixon Township	25.17	40.51	SR 227 north – Richmond	Indiana state line
1.000 mi = 1.609 km; 1.000 km = 0.621 mi: Concurrency terminus
