= Morgan Township, Butler County, Ohio =

Township in Ohio, US

- Township
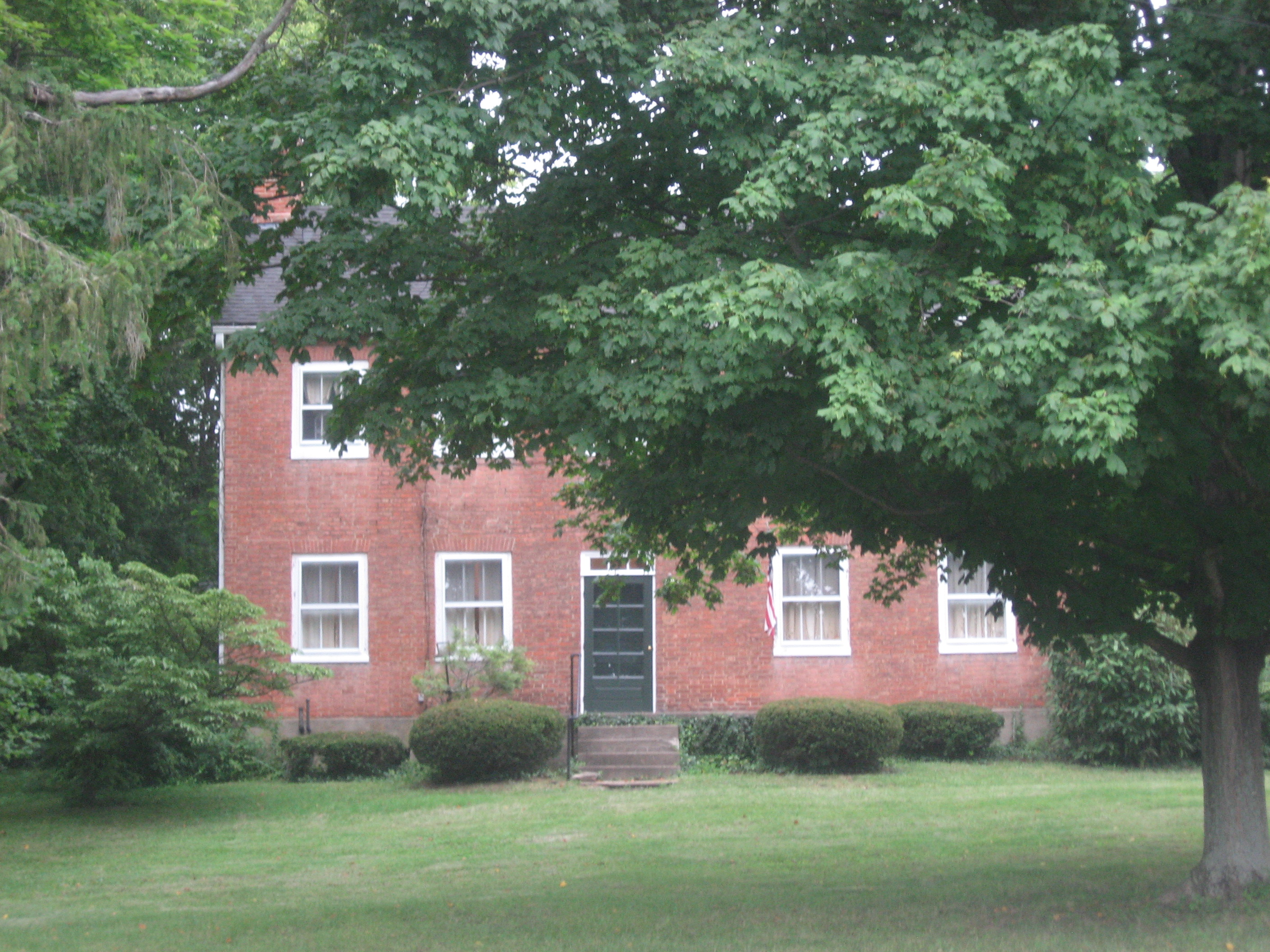
- John Vaughan House

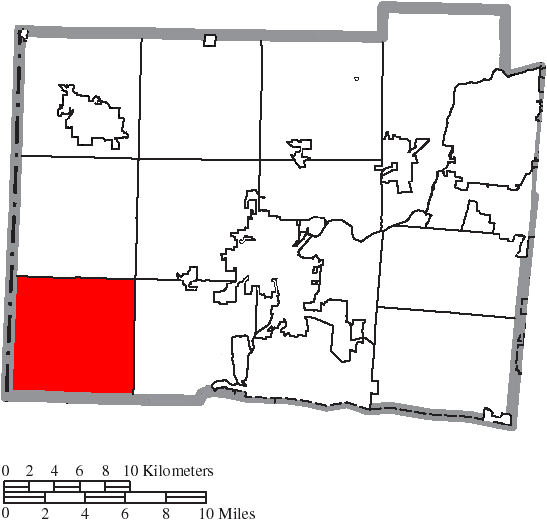
- Location of Morgan Township in Butler County
- Coordinates: 39°20′39″N 84°45′34″W
- Country: United States
- State: Ohio
- County: Butler

Area
  - Total: 36.8 sq mi (95.3 km^{2})
  - Land: 36.8 sq mi (95.3 km^{2})
  - Water: 0 sq mi (0.0 km^{2})
- Elevation: 732 ft (223 m)

Population (2020)
  - Total: 5,345
  - Density: 150/sq mi (57.9/km^{2})
- Time zone: UTC-5 (Eastern (EST))
  - Summer (DST): UTC-4 (EDT)
- FIPS code: 39-52080
- GNIS feature ID: 1085816
- Website: www.morgantownship.org

Morgan Township is one of thirteen townships in Butler County, Ohio, United States. It is located in the southwestern corner of the county, on the state line with Indiana. It had a population of 5,345 at the 2020 census.

== History ==
The tenth in order of creation, Morgan Township was erected from Ross Township by the Butler County Commissioners (James Blackburn, William Robison, and John Wingate) on March 4, 1811.

== Geography ==
Located in the southwestern corner of the county, it borders the following townships:

- Reily Township - north
- Hanover Township - northeast corner
- Ross Township - east
- Crosby Township, Hamilton County - southeast
- Harrison Township, Hamilton County - south
- Harrison Township, Dearborn County, Indiana - southwest corner
- Whitewater Township, Franklin County, Indiana - west
- Springfield Township, Franklin County, Indiana - northwest corner

=== Name ===
Named for General Daniel Morgan, an officer in the American Revolutionary War, it is one of six Morgan Townships statewide.

== Transportation ==
Major highways include State Routes 126, 129, and 748.

== Government ==
The township is governed by a three-member board of trustees, who are elected in November of odd-numbered years to a four-year term beginning on the following January 1. Two are elected in the year after the presidential election and one is elected in the year before it. There is also an elected township fiscal officer, who serves a four-year term beginning on April 1 of the year after the election, which is held in November of the year before the presidential election. Vacancies in the fiscal officership or on the board of trustees are filled by the remaining trustees.
