= Hueston Woods State Park =

Park in Ohio, US

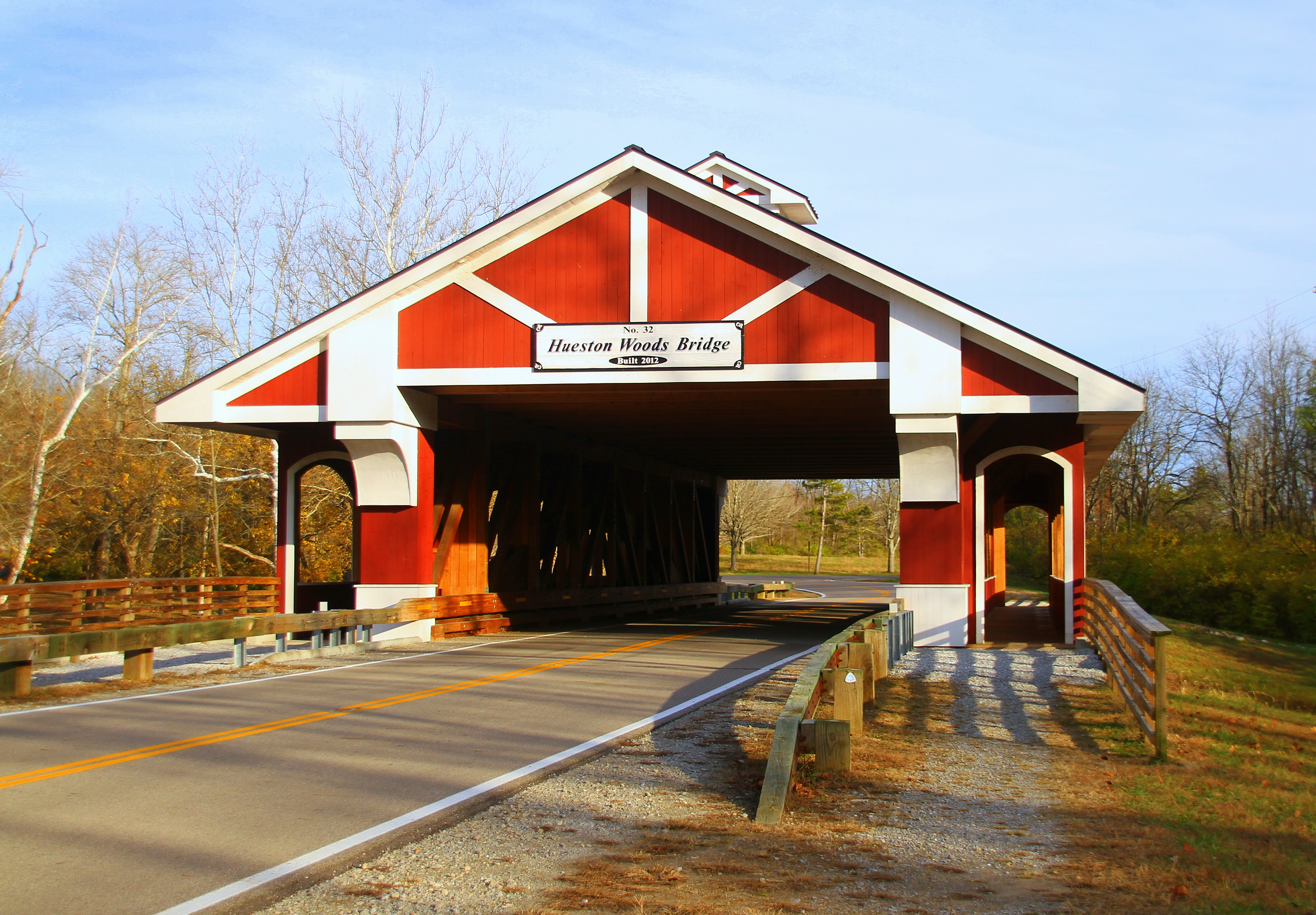
- Hueston Woods Covered Bridge

- Location within Ohio Location within the United States
- Location: Butler and Preble counties, Ohio, United States
- Coordinates: 39°34′21″N 84°44′29″W
- Area: 2,936 acres (1,188 ha)
- Elevation: 938 ft (286 m)
- Established: 1957
- Administrator: Ohio Department of Natural Resources
- Designation: Ohio state park
- Website: Hueston Woods State Park

Acton Lake
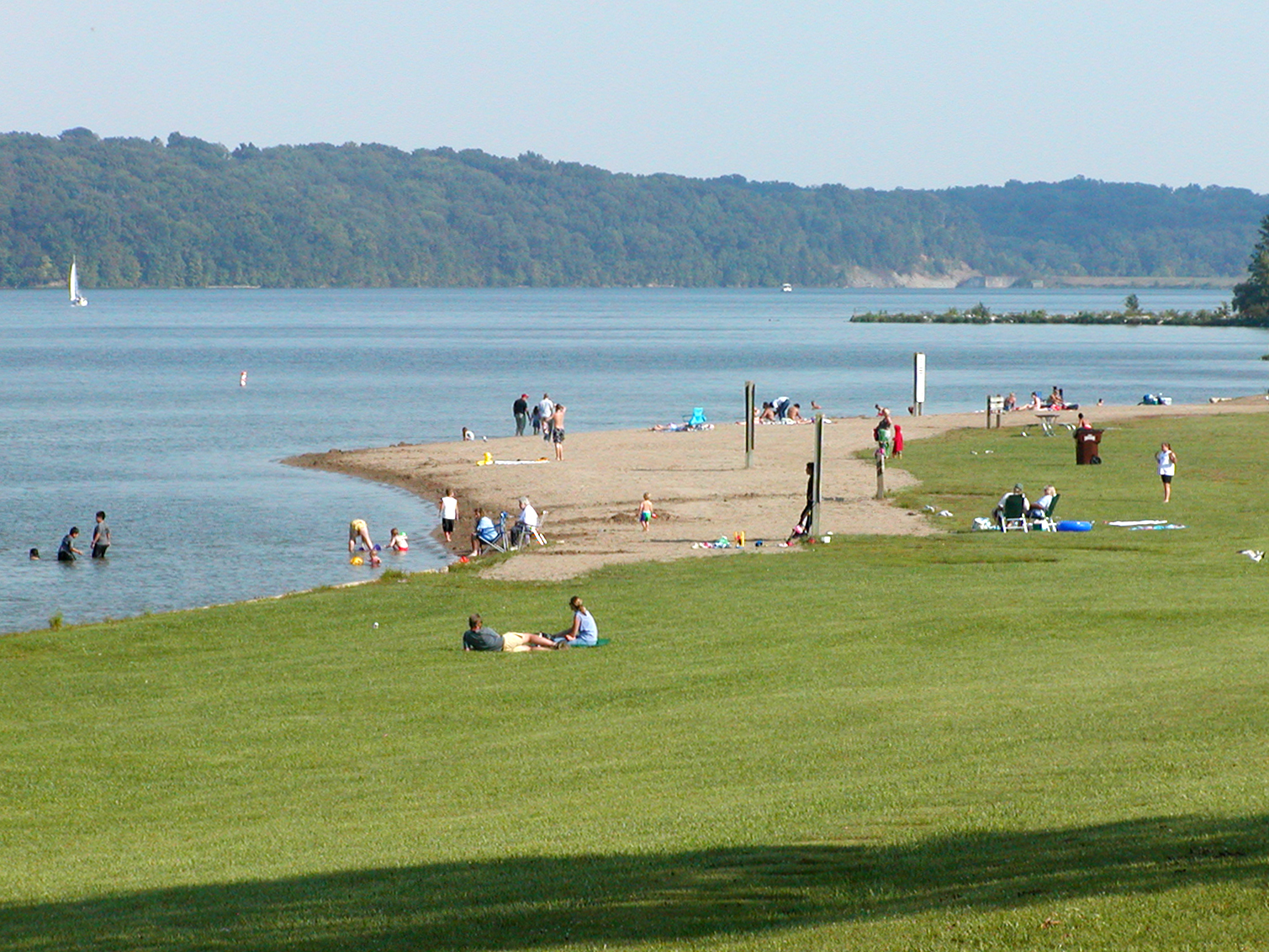
- Acton Lake

- Location within Ohio
- Location: Southwestern Ohio
- Coordinates: 39°34′19″N 84°44′53″W
- Lake type: Reservoir
- Basin countries: United States
- Max. length: 2.3 mi (3.7 km)
- Max. width: 0.5 mi (0.80 km)
- Surface area: 625 acres (253 ha)
- Surface elevation: 860 ft (260 m)

Hueston Woods State Park is a state park located in Butler and Preble counties of the U.S. state of Ohio, about five miles (8 km) northeast of Oxford in the southwestern part of the state. The park lies in Oxford Township, Butler County, and Israel Township, Preble County. It has nearly 3,000 acres (1,200 ha), including a man-made lake of 625 acres (253 ha). The park's beech-maple climax forest has been designated a National Natural Landmark.

== History ==
The state bought the land in 1941, but the park did not open until 1957. The state used the land initially as a prison camp. In 1956, Four Mile Creek was dammed to form Acton Lake, named for Clyde Acton, the member of the Ohio General Assembly who persuaded the legislature to buy the property. Hueston Woods was designated as a National Natural Landmark by the National Park Service in 1967.

The park was temporarily named after former Cincinnati Bengals player Ickey Woods prior to Super Bowl LVI.

== Features ==
"The limestone and shale bedrock of the Hueston Woods area provides evidence of the ancient shallow sea that once covered Ohio. Fossilized remains of ancient marine animals are so abundant that visitors from around the world are drawn to Hueston Woods to collect them." Fossils found at this State Park include:

- Bryozoans, brachiopods, pelecypods, horn corals, cephalopods, gastropods, crinoids, trilobites and mollusks.

The Hueston Woods Covered Bridge in Preble County was completed and opened for traffic in June 2012. The $2.0 million Burr arch truss structure spans 108 feet over Four Mile Creek north and west of the park. The structure supports 40 ton tractor trailer traffic and has a life expectancy of over 100 years.

The Doty Homestead is a mid 19th-century brick farmhouse that is operated by the Oxford Museum Association as a historic house museum. It is open on Sunday afternoons in the summer season.

Mammals that call the park home include beaver, mink, white-tail deer, foxes, eastern coyotes, bobcats, opossums, muskrats, cottontail rabbits, skunks, and more.

== Activities and amenities ==
The park offers boating, camping, fishing, swimming, 12 miles (19 km) of hiking trails, 18 miles (29 km) of bridle trails, 20 miles (32 km) of mountain biking trails, cabins, 96-room lodge, and golf course.
