= Millville, Ohio =

- Village
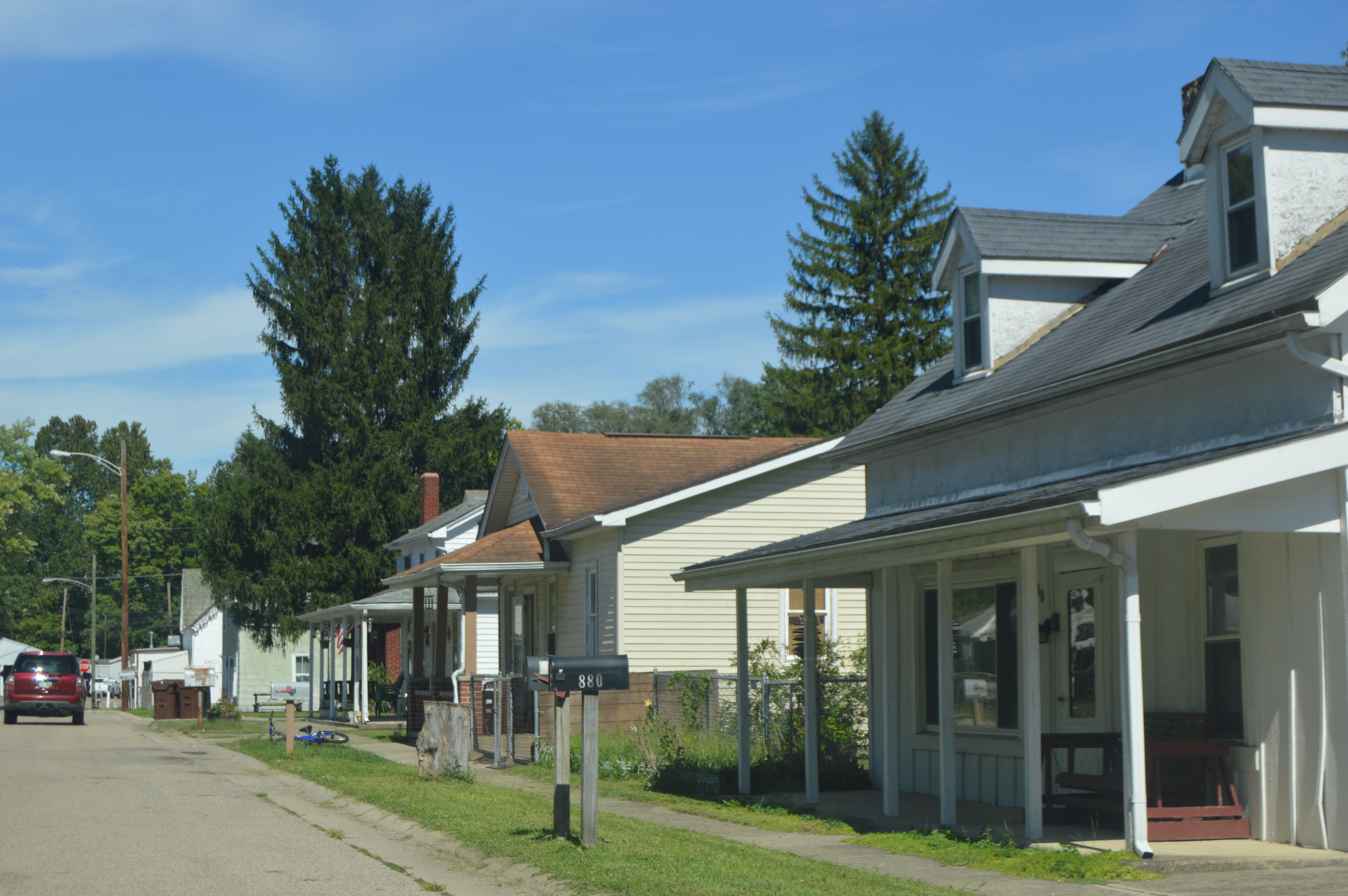
- Liberty Street
- Motto(s): "Small Town, Big Community!"
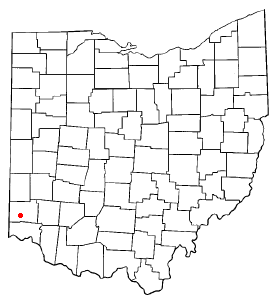
- Location of Millville, Ohio

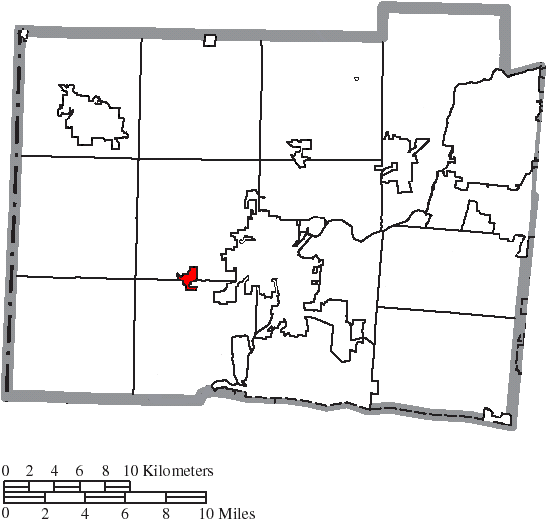
- Location of Millville in Butler County
- Coordinates: 39°23′33″N 84°39′10″W
- Country: United States
- State: Ohio
- County: Butler
- Townships: Hanover, Ross

Government
  - Mayor: Curt Pennington

Area
  - Total: 0.58 sq mi (1.51 km^{2})
  - Land: 0.58 sq mi (1.51 km^{2})
  - Water: 0 sq mi (0.00 km^{2})
- Elevation: 620 ft (190 m)

Population (2020)
  - Total: 634
  - Density: 1,086.9/sq mi (419.65/km^{2})
- Time zone: UTC-5 (Eastern (EST))
  - Summer (DST): UTC-4 (EDT)
- ZIP code: 45013
- Area code: 513
- FIPS code: 39-50540
- GNIS feature ID: 2399364

Millville is a village in Butler County, Ohio, United States. The population was 634 at the 2020 census. Millville sits between Oxford, Ohio and Cincinnati, Ohio along U.S. Route 27.

Millville is part of Greater Cincinnati, just west of Hamilton, Ohio.

== History ==
The village was established in 1815 by Joseph Van Horn, who opened a grist mill there about 1805.

Approximately 5.5 miles to the north is the historic Presbyterian cemetery that includes graves of early pioneers including some who served in the revolutionary war. There are many graves of families with the name Ross, the name of nearby town Ross, Ohio.

== Notable people ==
Major League Baseball's first commissioner, Kenesaw Mountain Landis, was born in Millville.

== Geography ==
According to the United States Census Bureau, the village has a total area of 0.58 square miles (1.50 km^{2}), all land.

== Demographics ==
Historical population
Census	Pop.	Note	%±
1880	250		—
1930	301		—
1940	335		11.3%
1950	458		36.7%
1960	676		47.6%
1970	697		3.1%
1980	809		16.1%
1990	755		−6.7%
2000	817		8.2%
2010	708		−13.3%
2020	634		−10.5%
U.S. Decennial Census

=== 2010 census ===
As of the census of 2010, there were 708 people, 269 households, and 197 families living in the village. The population density was 1,220.7 inhabitants per square mile (471.3/km^{2}). There were 298 housing units at an average density of 513.8 per square mile (198.4/km^{2}). The racial makeup of the village was 97.5% White, 0.1% African American, 0.1% Native American, 0.8% Asian, 0.4% from other races, and 1.0% from two or more races. Hispanic or Latino of any race were 0.3% of the population.

There were 269 households, of which 36.4% had children under the age of 18 living with them, 53.2% were married couples living together, 13.4% had a female householder with no husband present, 6.7% had a male householder with no wife present, and 26.8% were non-families. 23.0% of all households were made up of individuals, and 10.7% had someone living alone who was 65 years of age or older. The average household size was 2.63 and the average family size was 3.03.

The median age in the village was 38.9 years. 23% of residents were under the age of 18; 11.4% were between the ages of 18 and 24; 24.3% were from 25 to 44; 27.4% were from 45 to 64; and 14% were 65 years of age or older. The gender makeup of the village was 48.2% male and 51.8% female.

=== 2000 census ===
As of the census of 2000, there were 817 people, 312 households, and 247 families living in the village. The population density was 1,382.8 inhabitants per square mile (533.9/km^{2}). There were 330 housing units at an average density of 558.6 per square mile (215.7/km^{2}). The racial makeup of the village was 98.29% White, 0.61% African American, 0.12% Native American, 0.12% Asian, 0.37% from other races, and 0.49% from two or more races.

There were 312 households, out of which 35.6% had children under the age of 18 living with them, 59.6% were married couples living together, 15.1% had a female householder with no husband present, and 20.8% were non-families. 17.6% of all households were made up of individuals, and 6.7% had someone living alone who was 65 years of age or older. The average household size was 2.62 and the average family size was 2.93.

In the village, the population was spread out, with 25.6% under the age of 18, 6.7% from 18 to 24, 30.5% from 25 to 44, 25.8% from 45 to 64, and 11.4% who were 65 years of age or older. The median age was 37 years. For every 100 females there were 87.8 males. For every 100 females age 18 and over, there were 89.4 males.

The median income for a household in the village was $45,341, and the median income for a family was $45,972. Males had a median income of $39,306 versus $25,208 for females. The per capita income for the village was $18,835. About 6.5% of families and 7.0% of the population were below the poverty line, including 9.9% of those under age 18 and 11.0% of those age 65 or over.

== Education ==
The village of Millville and surrounding Ross Township is served by the Ross Local School District and Ross High School. The athletic teams at Ross are known as the Rams and compete in the Southwest Ohio Conference (SWOC).

=== Schools ===
- Morgan Elementary
- Elda Elementary
- Ross Middle School
- Ross High School
