= National Register of Historic Places listings in Butler County, Ohio =

Location of Butler County in Ohio

This is a list of the National Register of Historic Places listings in Butler County, Ohio.

This is intended to be a complete list of the properties and districts on the National Register of Historic Places in Butler County, Ohio, United States. The locations of National Register properties and districts for which the latitude and longitude coordinates are included below, may be seen in an online map.

There are 93 properties and districts listed on the National Register in the county, including 3 National Historic Landmarks. Another 3 properties were once listed but have been removed.

This National Park Service list is complete through NPS recent listings posted June 26, 2026.

== Current listings ==
	Name on the Register	Image	Date listed	Location	City or town	Description
1	Dr. William S. Alexander House	Dr. William S. Alexander House	March 18, 1987 (#86003498)	22 N. College Ave. 39°30′40″N 84°44′44″W	Oxford	
2	Anderson-Shaffer House	Anderson-Shaffer House	January 18, 1974 (#74001402)	404 Ross Ave. 39°24′15″N 84°34′18″W	Hamilton	
3	Augspurger Grist Mill		November 1, 1984 (#84000211)	Wayne-Madison Rd. at Woodsdale; 39°25′48″N 84°28′38″W	St. Clair Township	Grist mill built in 1868 in the company town of the Augsburger Paper Company; appears to have been demolished.
4	Augspurger Paper Company Rowhouse 1	Augspurger Paper Company Rowhouse 1	November 1, 1984 (#84000216)	1698 Wayne-Madison Rd. at Woodsdale; 39°26′02″N 84°28′33″W	Madison Township	
5	Augspurger Paper Company Rowhouse 2	Augspurger Paper Company Rowhouse 2	November 1, 1984 (#84000215)	1692 Wayne-Madison Rd. at Woodsdale; 39°26′01″N 84°28′33″W	Madison Township	
6	Augspurger Schoolhouse	Augspurger Schoolhouse	November 1, 1984 (#84000212)	Wayne-Madison Rd. at Woodsdale; 39°26′06″N 84°28′32″W	Madison Township	
7	Frederick Augspurger Farm	Frederick Augspurger Farm	August 3, 1984 (#84002900)	1856 Wayne-Madison Rd., south of Trenton; 39°26′18″N 84°28′33″W	Madison Township	
8	John Augspurger Farm No. 1	John Augspurger Farm No. 1	August 3, 1984 (#84002901)	2731 Woodsdale Rd., south of Trenton; 39°27′51″N 84°27′02″W	Madison Township	Demolished
9	John Augspurger Farm No. 2	John Augspurger Farm No. 2	November 1, 1984 (#84000208)	3046 Pierson Rd. 39°27′57″N 84°27′34″W	Trenton	
10	Samuel Augspurger Farm	Samuel Augspurger Farm	November 1, 1984 (#84000209)	2070 Woodsdale Rd., south of Trenton; 39°26′40″N 84°27′42″W	Madison Township	
11	Samuel Augspurger House	Samuel Augspurger House	November 1, 1984 (#84000213)	1659 Wayne-Madison Rd. at Woodsdale; 39°25′58″N 84°28′36″W	St. Clair Township	
12	Austin-Magie Farm and Mill District	Austin-Magie Farm and Mill District	December 21, 1982 (#82001360)	Section 14 in Oxford Township; 39°31′32″N 84°43′56″W	Oxford Township	
13	Beckett-Manrod House	Beckett-Manrod House	November 11, 1977 (#77001044)	2019 Stillwell-Beckett Rd., northwest of Hamilton; 39°27′10″N 84°37′42″W	Hanover Township	
14	Benninghofen House	Benninghofen House	May 17, 1973 (#73001388)	327 N. 2nd St. 39°24′14″N 84°33′37″W	Hamilton	
15	Big Four Depot	Big Four Depot	December 24, 2013 (#13000979)	25 Charles St. 39°30′50″N 84°23′32″W	Middletown	
16	Butler County Courthouse	Butler County Courthouse	June 22, 1981 (#81000429)	2nd and High Sts. 39°23′59″N 84°33′46″W	Hamilton	
17	Central Avenue Historic District	Central Avenue Historic District	August 8, 2014 (#14000480)	Central Ave. 39°30′59″N 84°24′08″W	Middletown	
18	Champion Coated Paper Company	Champion Coated Paper Company	September 9, 2019 (#100004357)	601 North B St. 39°24′37″N 84°33′37″W	Hamilton	
19	Cincinnati, Hamilton, and Dayton Railroad Station	Cincinnati, Hamilton, and Dayton Railroad Station	July 19, 2024 (#100010527)	409 Maple Avenue; 39°23′39″N 84°33′33″W	Hamilton	
20	Cochran Farm	Cochran Farm	July 16, 1973 (#73001390)	2900 State Route 129, west of Millville; 39°23′18″N 84°39′35″W	Ross Township	
21	Dayton-Campbell Historic District	Dayton-Campbell Historic District	June 30, 1983 (#83001947)	Primarily Dayton, High, and Campbell Ave. between 6th and 11th Sts. 39°23′55″N 84°33′07″W	Hamilton	
22	Demoret Mound		October 21, 1975 (#75001337)	2,700 feet (820 m) west of the lake at the former Ross Trails Girl Scout Camp	Ross Township	
23	Henry P. Deuscher House	Henry P. Deuscher House	February 9, 1984 (#84002902)	2385 Woodsdale Rd., south of Trenton; 39°27′06″N 84°26′47″W	Madison Township	
24	Zachariah Price Dewitt Cabin	Zachariah Price Dewitt Cabin	April 13, 1973 (#73001392)	East of Oxford on State Route 73; 39°30′38″N 84°43′07″W	Oxford Township	
25	Dixon-Globe Opera House-Robinson-Schwenn Building	Dixon-Globe Opera House-Robinson-Schwenn Building	July 14, 2000 (#00000799)	221 High St. 39°23′58″N 84°33′39″W	Hamilton	
26	Edgeton	Edgeton	April 3, 1975 (#75001331)	575 Harrison Ave. 39°24′21″N 84°35′11″W	Hamilton	
27	Christian Ehresman Farm	Christian Ehresman Farm	August 3, 1984 (#84002903)	900 Woodsdale Rd. 39°28′12″N 84°27′11″W	Trenton	
28	Elliott and Stoddard Halls	Elliott and Stoddard Halls	April 3, 1973 (#73001391)	Miami University campus 39°30′31″N 84°44′07″W	Oxford	
29	Fairfield Township Works I	Fairfield Township Works I	November 5, 1971 (#71000631)	Eastern bank of the Great Miami River, 4 miles (6.4 km) above Hamilton; 39°25′28″N 84°29′00″W	Fairfield Township	Near Hamilton
30	Fitz Randolph-Rogers House	Fitz Randolph-Rogers House	February 8, 1978 (#78002014)	5467 Liberty-Fairfield Rd., east of Hamilton; 39°25′08″N 84°28′45″W	Fairfield Township	
31	Fortified Hill Works	Fortified Hill Works	July 12, 1974 (#74001403)	Western side of the Great Miami River, 3 miles (4.8 km) below Hamilton; 39°21′46″N 84°35′33″W	Ross Township	
32	Garver-Rentschler Barn	Garver-Rentschler Barn	August 11, 1980 (#80002947)	1030 New London Rd., southwest of Hamilton; 39°23′17″N 84°36′14″W	Ross Township	
33	German Village Historic District	German Village Historic District	February 7, 1991 (#90002216)	Roughly bounded by Vine, Dayton, Riverfront Plaza, and Martin Luther King Jr. Boulevard; 39°24′12″N 84°33′33″W	Hamilton	
34	Great Mound	Great Mound	October 7, 1971 (#71000633)	West of Middletown; 39°30′56″N 84°28′35″W	Madison Township	
35	Greenwood Cemetery	Greenwood Cemetery	July 22, 1994 (#94000771)	1602 Greenwood Ave. 39°24′12″N 84°32′34″W	Hamilton	
36	Hamilton Catholic High School	Hamilton Catholic High School	July 24, 1986 (#86001917)	533 Dayton St. 39°24′01″N 84°33′20″W	Hamilton	
37	Hamilton Downtown Historic District	Hamilton Downtown Historic District	July 18, 2016 (#16000458)	135-245 and 250-358 High, 9-21 N. 3rd, 6-222 S. 2nd, 2-306 and 11-301 S. 3rd, 105-309 and 224-234 Court, and 311-316 Ludlow Sts. 39°23′57″N 84°33′36″W	Hamilton	
38	Hamilton Historic Civic Center	Hamilton Historic Civic Center	June 29, 1995 (#94000170)	Roughly bounded by Market St., High St., Court St., and Monument Ave., including High-Main St. Bridge; 39°24′04″N 84°33′53″W	Hamilton	
39	Harding-Jones Paper Company District	Harding-Jones Paper Company District	May 29, 1975 (#75001330)	Both sides of S. Main St. at its junction with railroad tracks in Excello; 39°28′34″N 84°25′14″W	Lemon Township	
40	Herron Gymnasium	Herron Gymnasium	November 29, 1979 (#79001788)	Miami University campus 39°30′34″N 84°44′02″W	Oxford	Demolished
41	James P. Hidley Cottage	James P. Hidley Cottage	August 18, 1980 (#80002951)	1820 Oxford-Reily Rd., south of Oxford; 39°26′05″N 84°45′31″W	Reily Township	
42	High Street Commercial Block	High Street Commercial Block	March 3, 2004 (#04000113)	228, 232, and 236 High St.; 216-226 High Street; 39°23′59″N 84°33′39″W	Hamilton	Boundary increased in May 2014
43	Hogan-Borger Mound Archeological District	Hogan-Borger Mound Archeological District	October 21, 1975 (#75001338)	Eastern side of Hamilton-New London Rd., north of Ross; 39°20′41″N 84°39′34″W	Ross Township	
44	Hotel Manchester	Hotel Manchester	September 10, 2014 (#14000589)	1027 Manchester Ave. 39°31′04″N 84°24′10″W	Middletown	
45	Howe Tavern	Howe Tavern	January 30, 1976 (#76001376)	U.S. Route 27; 39°34′02″N 84°48′54″W	College Corner	
46	Matthew Hueston House	Matthew Hueston House	September 16, 1977 (#77001045)	1320 Four Mile Creek Rd., northwest of Hamilton; 39°28′00″N 84°36′21″W	Hanover Township	
47	Hughes Manor	Hughes Manor	March 17, 1994 (#94000242)	5894 Hamilton-Lebanon Rd. 39°26′51″N 84°25′03″W	Monroe	
48	Hughes School	Hughes School	January 2, 1976 (#76001377)	5994 Princeton Rd., east of Hamilton; 39°23′12″N 84°25′13″W	Liberty Township	
49	Hunting Lodge Farm	Hunting Lodge Farm	October 20, 1982 (#82001361)	Southeast of Oxford at 5349 Coulter Ln. 39°31′15″N 84°43′20″W	Oxford Township	
50	Christian Iutzi Farm	Christian Iutzi Farm	August 3, 1984 (#84002904)	2180 Woodsdale Rd., south of Trenton; 39°26′39″N 84°27′18″W	Madison Township	
51	John Kennel Sr. Farm	John Kennel Sr. Farm	August 3, 1984 (#84002906)	5506 Kennel Rd. 39°27′42″N 84°28′31″W	Trenton	
52	John Kennel Jr. Farm	John Kennel Jr. Farm	August 3, 1984 (#84002907)	2251 Wayne-Madison Rd., south of Trenton; 39°26′49″N 84°28′37″W	St. Clair Township	
53	Elias Kumler House	Elias Kumler House	January 3, 1980 (#80002948)	120 S. Main St. 39°30′31″N 84°44′34″W	Oxford	
54	Lane's Mill Historic Buildings	Lane's Mill Historic Buildings	October 3, 1980 (#80002950)	South of Oxford at 3884 Wallace Rd. 39°28′57″N 84°41′32″W	Milford Township	
55	Lane-Hooven House	Lane-Hooven House	October 25, 1973 (#73001389)	319 N. 3rd St. 39°24′13″N 84°33′34″W	Hamilton	
56	Langstroth Cottage	Langstroth Cottage	June 22, 1976 (#76001378)	303 Patterson Ave. 39°30′23″N 84°43′49″W	Oxford	
57	Main Street Commercial Historic District	Main Street Commercial Historic District	February 22, 2014 (#14000027)	Junction of Main St. and Central Ave. 39°31′02″N 84°24′17″W	Middletown	
58	Henry Maltby House	Henry Maltby House	November 29, 1979 (#79001789)	216 E. Church St; 39°30′42″N 84°44′19″W	Oxford	Demolished
59	Mann Mound	Mann Mound	October 7, 1971 (#71000632)	Section 12 of Wayne Township, northeast of Jacksonburg; 39°33′06″N 84°29′42″W	Wayne Township	
60	William H. McGuffey House	William H. McGuffey House	October 15, 1966 (#66000605)	401 E. Spring St. 39°30′25″N 84°44′10″W	Oxford	
61	Miami-Erie Canal Site Historic District	Miami-Erie Canal Site Historic District	December 18, 1978 (#78002016)	5171-5251 Rialto Rd., west of West Chester; 39°19′29″N 84°27′07″W	West Chester Township	
62	Mill Office and Post Office	Mill Office and Post Office	November 1, 1984 (#84000214)	1701 Woodsdale Rd. in Woodsdale; 39°25′57″N 84°28′32″W	Madison Township	
63	Morgan Township House	Morgan Township House	November 2, 2016 (#16000753)	6464 Okeana Drewersburg Rd. at Okeana; 39°20′54″N 84°46′00″W	Morgan Township	
64	Morgan-Hueston House	Morgan-Hueston House	October 1, 1990 (#90001495)	Ross Rd. between Mack Rd. and Woodridge Boulevard; 39°18′39″N 84°30′18″W	Fairfield	
65	Notre Dame Academy and Notre Dame High School	Notre Dame Academy and Notre Dame High School	February 2, 2001 (#01000048)	926 2nd St. 39°23′27″N 84°33′52″W	Hamilton	
66	Oakland Residential Historic District		March 20, 2023 (#100008736)	Bounded by 1st, Curtis, Woodlawn, Parkview, and Calumet Aves., Grove, Garfield, and Richmond Sts. 39°30′16″N 84°24′01″W	Middletown	
67	Oxford Female Institute	Oxford Female Institute	April 26, 1976 (#76001379)	High St. and College Ave. 39°30′36″N 84°44′46″W	Oxford	
68	Oxford Railroad Depot and Junction House	Oxford Railroad Depot and Junction House	February 8, 1980 (#80002949)	S. Elm and W. Spring St. 39°30′27″N 84°44′51″W	Oxford	Depot is demolished; Junction House remains standing
69	Howell and Anna Powell Farm		November 1, 2019 (#100004562)	2720 Cincinnati-Brookville Rd. 39°18′46″N 84°39′17″W	Fairfield	Also listed as "Powell-Decker Farm".
70	Pugh's Mill Covered Bridge	Pugh's Mill Covered Bridge	June 5, 1975 (#75001336)	1 mi (1.6 km) north of Oxford off State Route 732; 39°31′26″N 84°44′06″W	Oxford Township	
71	Rentschler House	Rentschler House	April 21, 1983 (#83001948)	643 Dayton St. 39°23′59″N 84°33′14″W	Hamilton	
72	Roberts Mound	Roberts Mound	March 27, 1975 (#75001329)	Eastern side of Gates Rd., west of Millville; 39°23′53″N 84°43′10″W	Reily Township	
73	D.S. Rose Mound	D.S. Rose Mound	May 28, 1975 (#75001333)	Southwestern quarter of the northeastern quarter of Section 20 of Liberty Township, ¼ mile northwest of Poasttown; 39°23′45″N 84°23′36″W	Liberty Township	Demolished by the owner without a chance for archaeological excavation
74	Ross Trails Adena Circle		October 10, 1975 (#75001339)	Grounds of the former Ross Trails Girl Scout Camp	Ross Township	
75	Rossville Historic District	Rossville Historic District	October 6, 1975 (#75001332)	Roughly bounded by B, E, Main, and Amberly Dr. 39°24′00″N 84°34′14″W	Hamilton	
76	St. Stephen Church and Rectory	St. Stephen Church and Rectory	July 29, 1982 (#82003549)	224 Dayton St. 39°24′07″N 84°33′36″W	Hamilton	
77	Peter Schrock Jr. Farm	Peter Schrock Jr. Farm	November 1, 1984 (#84000210)	Edgewood Dr. 39°28′39″N 84°28′14″W	Trenton	
78	John Scott Barn and Granary	John Scott Barn and Granary	October 4, 2005 (#05001142)	3681 Hamilton-New London Rd., east of Shandon; 39°19′41″N 84°41′39″W	Ross Township	
79	Shaw Farm	Shaw Farm	July 24, 1974 (#74001405)	3357 Cincinnati-Brookville Rd., west of Ross; 39°18′25″N 84°40′22″W	Ross Township	
80	Shuler & Benninghofen Woolen Mill		September 5, 2023 (#100009299)	2350 Pleasant Ave. 39°22′23″N 84°33′26″W	Hamilton	
81	Sigma Alpha Epsilon Chapter House of Miami University	Sigma Alpha Epsilon Chapter House of Miami University	February 8, 2005 (#05000022)	310 Tallawanda Rd. 39°30′51″N 84°44′06″W	Oxford	
82	Dan F. Snider Ford Dealership Building	Dan F. Snider Ford Dealership Building	December 11, 2014 (#14001050)	101 N. Main St. 39°31′06″N 84°24′12″W	Middletown	
83	South Main Street District	South Main Street District	March 21, 1978 (#78002015)	S. Main St. 39°30′45″N 84°24′33″W	Middletown	
84	Spread Eagle Tavern-James D. Conrey House	Spread Eagle Tavern-James D. Conrey House	October 24, 2003 (#03001100)	9797 Cincinnati-Columbus Rd., north of Cincinnati; 39°18′30″N 84°23′05″W	West Chester Township	
85	Symmes Mission Chapel	Symmes Mission Chapel	June 12, 1980 (#80002946)	5139 Pleasant Ave. 39°20′22″N 84°33′37″W	Fairfield	
86	Thomas Select School	Thomas Select School	April 11, 1977 (#77001046)	3637 Millville-Shandon Rd. at Shandon; 39°19′41″N 84°42′53″W	Morgan Township	
87	John B. Tytus House	John B. Tytus House	May 27, 1975 (#75001335)	300 S. Main St. 39°30′47″N 84°23′49″W	Middletown	
88	Union Township Works II	Union Township Works II	October 7, 1971 (#71000635)	Southern side of Dimmick Rd. on the eastern side of Sharon Creek; 39°18′28″N 84°22′03″W	West Chester Township	Near Pisgah
89	Unzicker-Cook House	Unzicker-Cook House	July 24, 1974 (#74001404)	2975 Oxford-Middletown Rd., northeast of Oxford; 39°31′59″N 84°39′27″W	Morgan Township	
90	John Vaughan House	John Vaughan House	May 29, 1975 (#75001340)	3756 Hamilton-New London Rd. at Shandon; 39°19′35″N 84°42′38″W	Morgan Township	
91	Voice of America Bethany Relay Station	Voice of America Bethany Relay Station	November 28, 2006 (#06001081)	8070 Tylersville Rd., north of West Chester; 39°21′18″N 84°21′24″W	West Chester Township	
92	Western Female Seminary	Western Female Seminary	September 17, 1979 (#09000083)	Junction of U.S. Route 27 and State Route 73, Western College, Miami University; 39°30′14″N 84°43′36″W	Oxford	
93	Williamson Mound Archeological District	Williamson Mound Archeological District	May 29, 1975 (#75001334)	East of U.S. Route 42 on the western edge of the Wetherington Golf and Country Club; 39°22′01″N 84°23′04″W	West Chester Township	

== Former listings ==
	Name on the Register	Image	Date listed	Date removed	Location	City or town	Description
1	Fisher Hall	Fisher Hall	May 6, 1971 (#71000634)	July 1, 1978	Miami University campus	Oxford	Demolished in July 1978.
2	Phillip Hughes House		April 11, 1977 (#77001584)	July 27, 1977	East of Hamilton at the junction of State Routes 4 and 747; 39°25′39″N 84°27′00″W	Hamilton	Demolished in July 1977.
3	Pleasant Run Mounds		Unavailable (#73002287)	1975	Address Restricted	Fairfield	

== See also ==
- List of National Historic Landmarks in Ohio
- Listings in neighboring counties: Dearborn (IN), Franklin (IN), Hamilton, Montgomery, Preble, Union (IN), Warren
- National Register of Historic Places listings in Ohio
