= Augspurger Schoolhouse =

- U.S. National Register of Historic Places
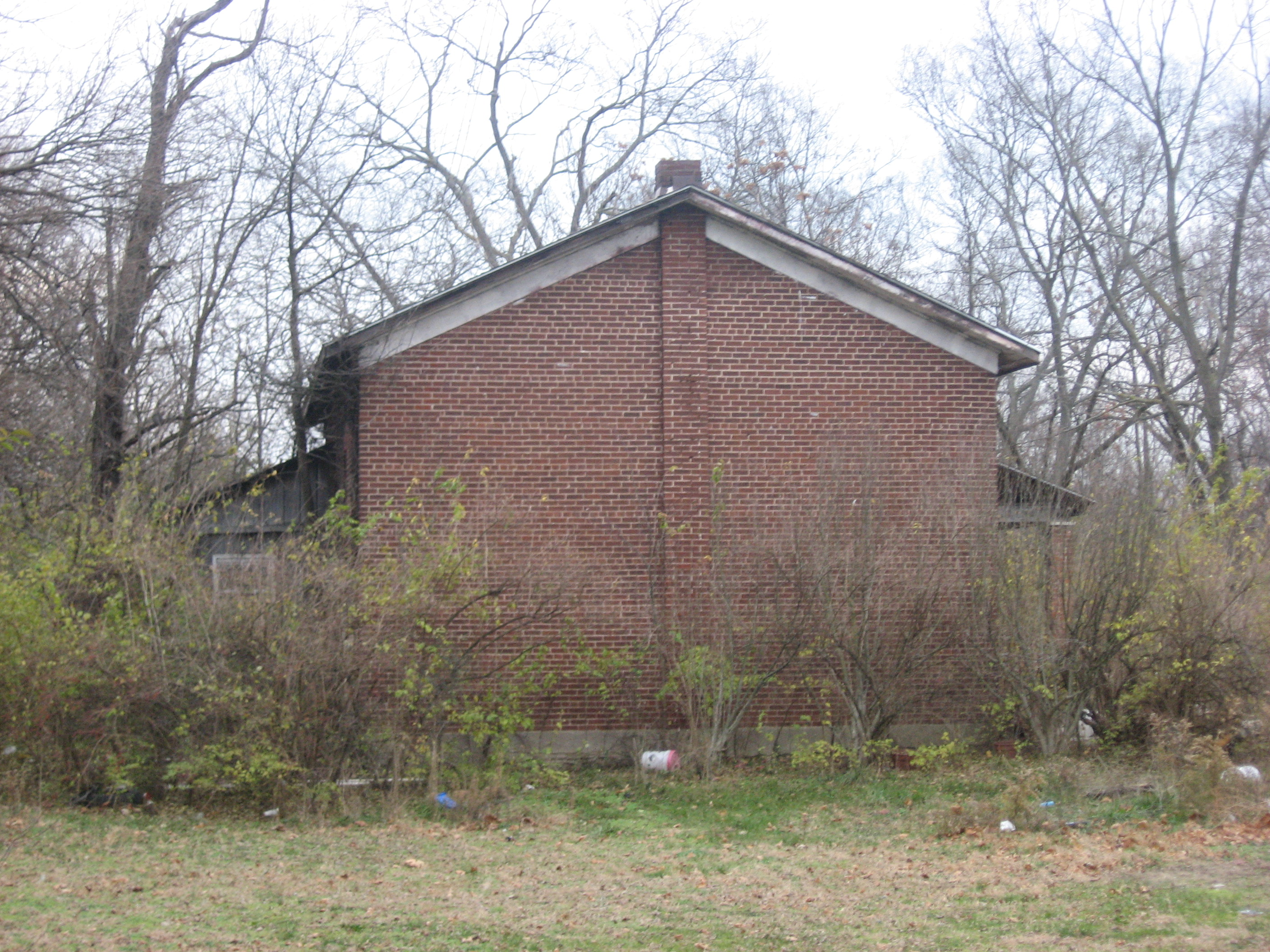
- Roadside view of building in 2012

- Location within Ohio Location within the United States
- Location: Woodsdale, Ohio
- Coordinates: 39°26′6″N 84°28′32″W
- Architectural style: Vernacular
- MPS: Augspurger Amish/Mennonite Settlement TR (64000607)
- NRHP reference No.: 84000212
- Added to NRHP: 1 November 1984

Augspurger Schoolhouse is a historic building in Woodsdale, Ohio. The original building was a rectangular schoolhouse. On November 1, 1984 it was listed in the National Register of Historic Places as part of a thematic resource, the "Augspurger Amish/Mennonite Settlement". As of 2016 the building had been demolished and the property left covered in detritus.

== See also ==
- Historical preservation
- History of education in the United States
- National Register of Historic Places in Butler County, Ohio
