= Christian Iutzi Farm =

Historic house in Ohio, United States

- U.S. National Register of Historic Places
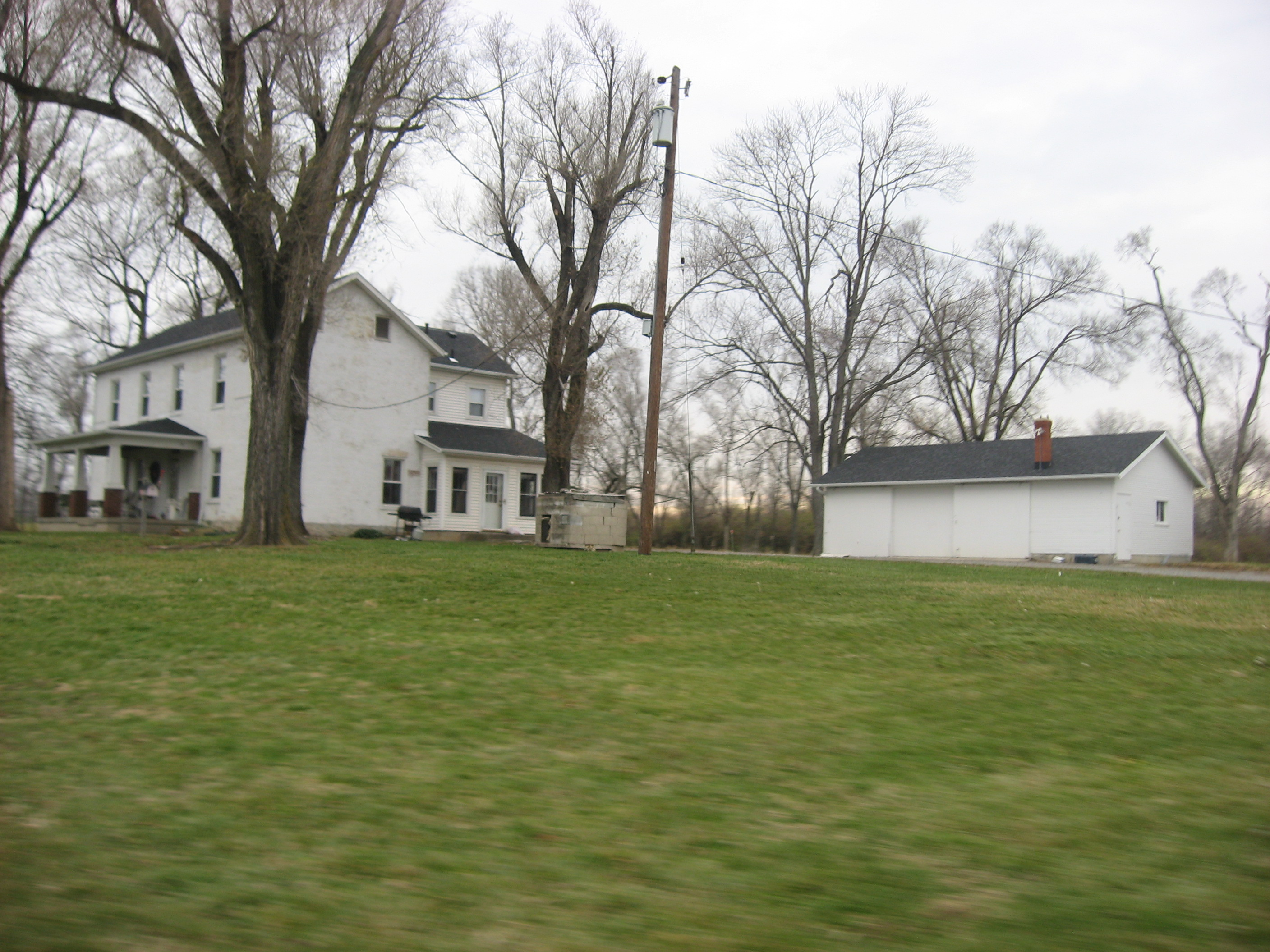
- House and a barn in 2012

- Location within Ohio Location within the United States
- Nearest city: Trenton, Ohio
- Coordinates: 39°26′34.95″N 84°27′39.56″W
- Built: 1834
- MPS: Augspurger Amish/Mennonite Settlement TR (64000607)
- NRHP reference No.: 84002904
- Added to NRHP: 3 August 1984

Christian Iutzi Farm is a historic property near Trenton, Ohio.

== Description and history ==
The farmhouse is a two-story brick building, with an off center entry, sitting on a rubble work stone foundation. It is the oldest extant house built by a member of the Amish Mennonite congregation. Christian Iutzi named the farm Middlehof after his home in Germany. Iutzi came to Butler County in 1832 as part of a group of 100 Hessian [sic] Mennonites. The Hessians broke with the Augspuger Amish congregation in 1835 with Iutzi's son and son-in-law serving as ministers for the Hessian church.

The property was listed in the United States National Register of Historic Places on August 3, 1984, as part of the thematic resource the "Augspurger Amish/Mennonite Settlement".

== See also ==
- History of religion in the United States
- National Register of Historic Places listings in Butler County, Ohio
