= Mill Office and Post Office =

Historic place in Woodsdale, Ohio, US

- U.S. National Register of Historic Places
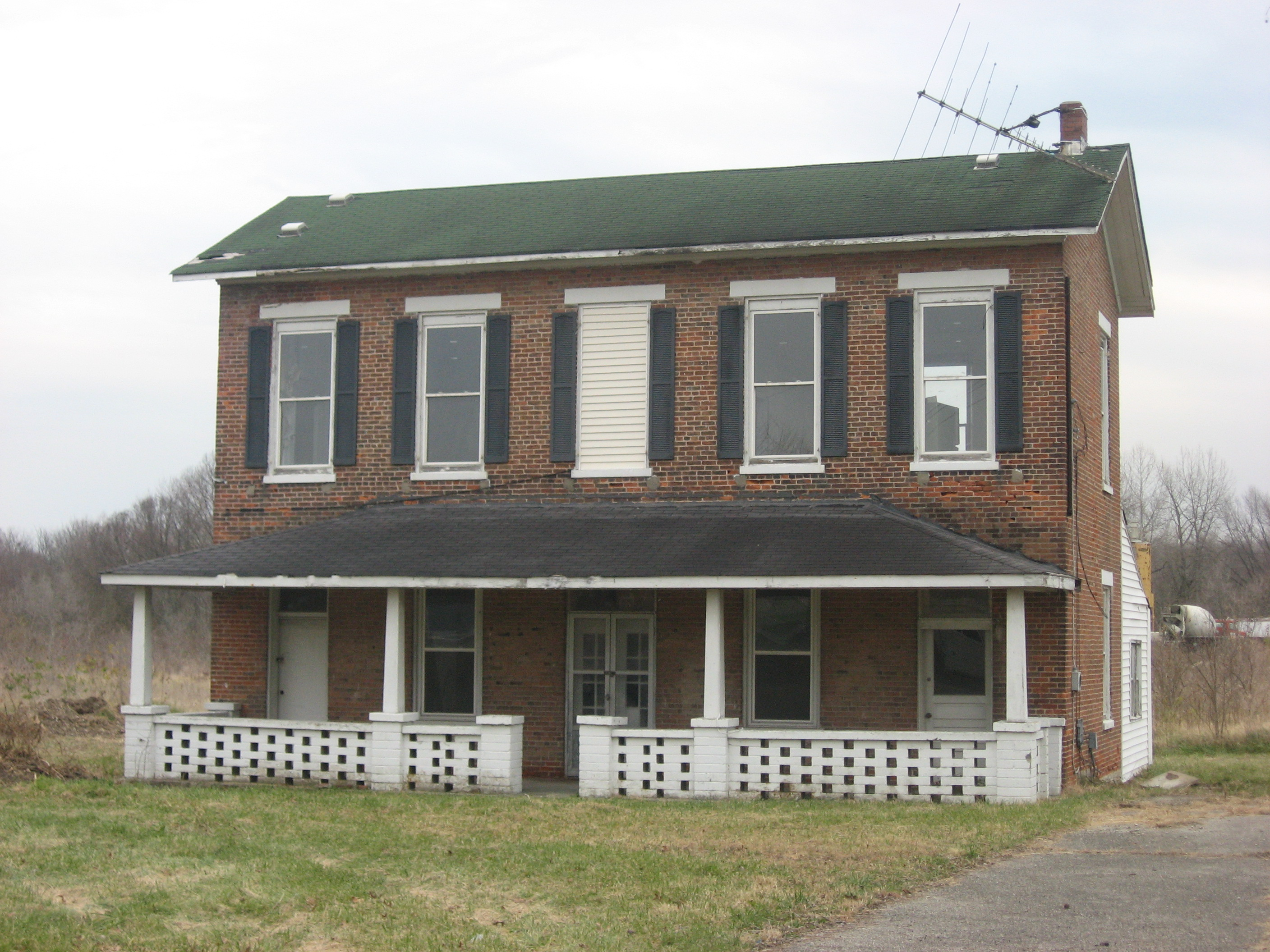
- Front and western side

- Location within Ohio
- Location: Woodsdale, Ohio
- Coordinates: 39°25′57″N 84°28′32″W
- MPS: Augspurger Amish/Mennonite Settlement TR
- NRHP reference No.: 84000214
- Added to NRHP: 1984-11-01

Mill Office and Post Office is a registered historic building in Woodsdale, Butler County, Ohio. It was used as department store and a US Post office from 1850 to 1874. It was listed in the National Register on November 1, 1984. The area is an Augspurger Amish and Mennonite settlement.
