= Augspurger Paper Company Rowhouse 1 =

Historic house in Ohio, United States

- U.S. National Register of Historic Places
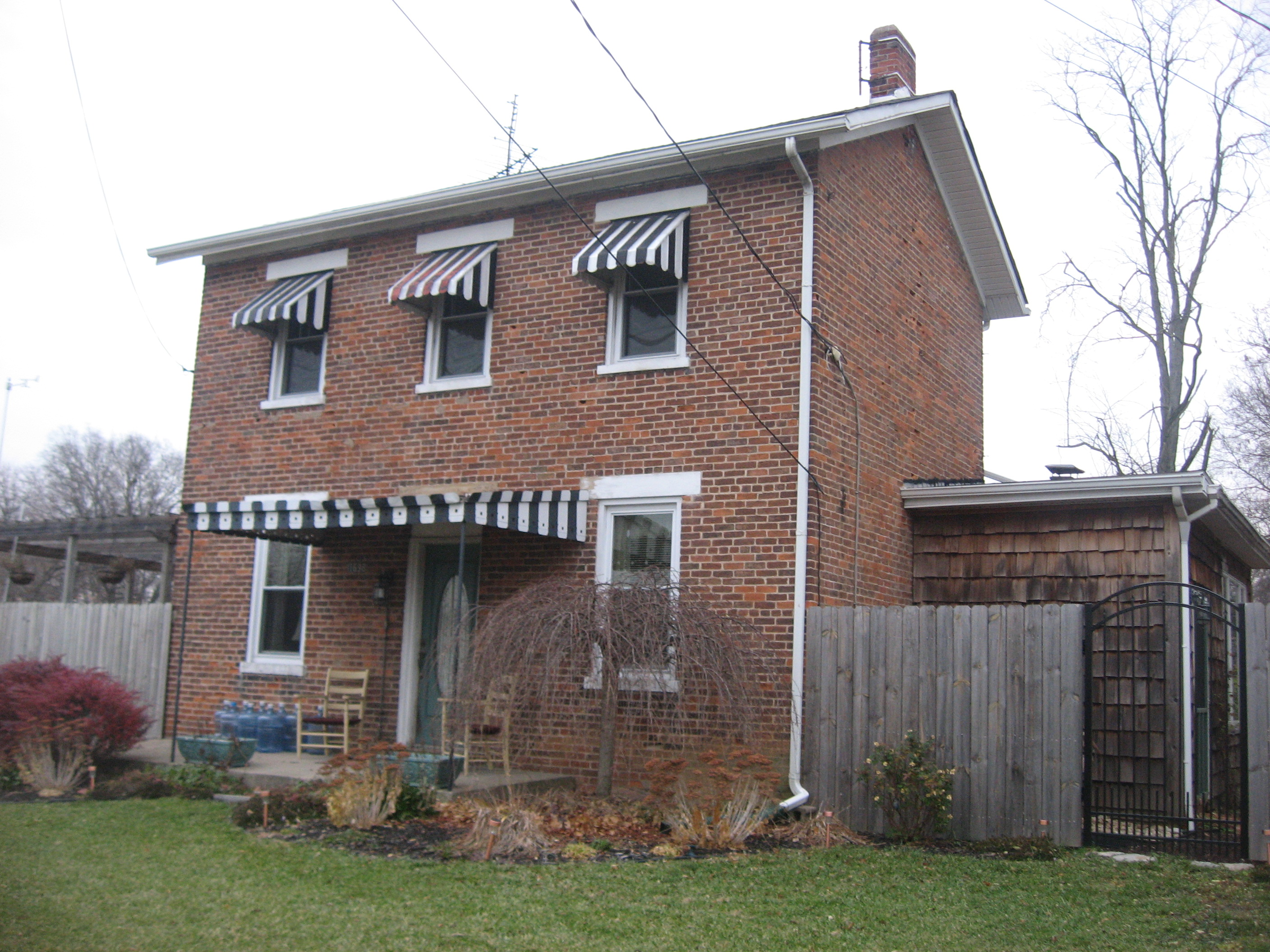
- Front of the house

- Location within Ohio Location within the United States
- Location: Woodsdale, Ohio
- Coordinates: 39°26′2″N 84°28′34″W
- MPS: Augspurger Amish/Mennonite Settlement TR
- NRHP reference No.: 84000216
- Added to NRHP: 1984-11-01

Augspurger Paper Company Rowhouse 1 is a registered historic building in Woodsdale, Ohio, USA, listed in the National Register on 1984-11-01.

== Historic uses ==
- Single dwelling
