= James P. Hidley Cottage =

Historic house in Ohio, United States

- U.S. National Register of Historic Places
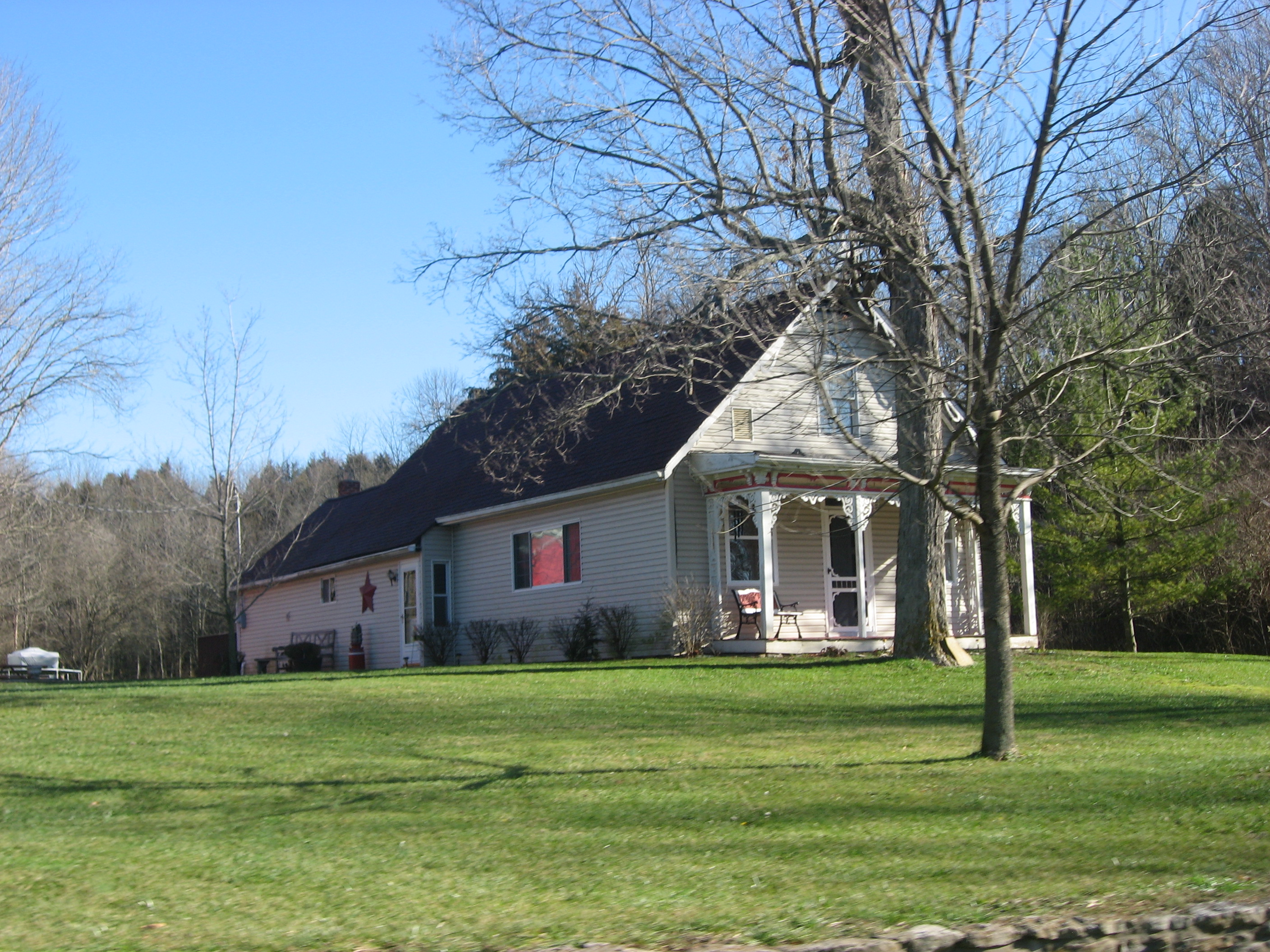
- Front and northern side

- Location within Ohio Location within the United States
- Location: 1820 Oxford-Reily Rd., Reily, Ohio
- Coordinates: 39°26′4″N 84°45′30″W
- Area: 3 acres (1.2 ha)
- Built: 1860
- Architect: James P. Hidley
- Architectural style: Carpenter Gothic
- NRHP reference No.: 80002951
- Added to NRHP: August 18, 1980

The James P. Hidley Cottage is a small Carpenter Gothic house in western Butler County, Ohio, United States. Erected in 1860, the house is important as one of the area's few houses of its style, and it has been named a historic site.

The cottage sits on land first owned by Butler County pioneer Samuel Dick, who acquired the title in 1801; he bequeathed it to his son David, who constructed a combined gristmill and sawmill on the property in 1810. A complex series of property transfers resulted in Hidley's acquiring title both to the mill and to the land on which the house was built, but years apart. He arranged for the house's construction in 1860, eight years before buying full title to the mill, which was ultimately demolished in 1940.

Built with weatherboarded walls on a stone foundation, the house features many elements of the Carpenter Gothic style. The walls are board and batten, unlike typical weatherboarding, while the gabled roof and the porch feature finely decorated bargeboards and other wooden details. Both doors and windows are placed both on the front and on the sides, with a single window appearing in the top half story. A single chimney sits at the center of the roofline.

In 1980, the Hidley Cottage was listed on the National Register of Historic Places, a distinction now held by more than eighty locations countywide. It qualified for designation based on its historically significant architecture, as very few authentic Carpenter Gothic houses built in Butler County have survived to the present day.
