= Edgeton =

Historic house in Ohio, United States

- U.S. National Register of Historic Places
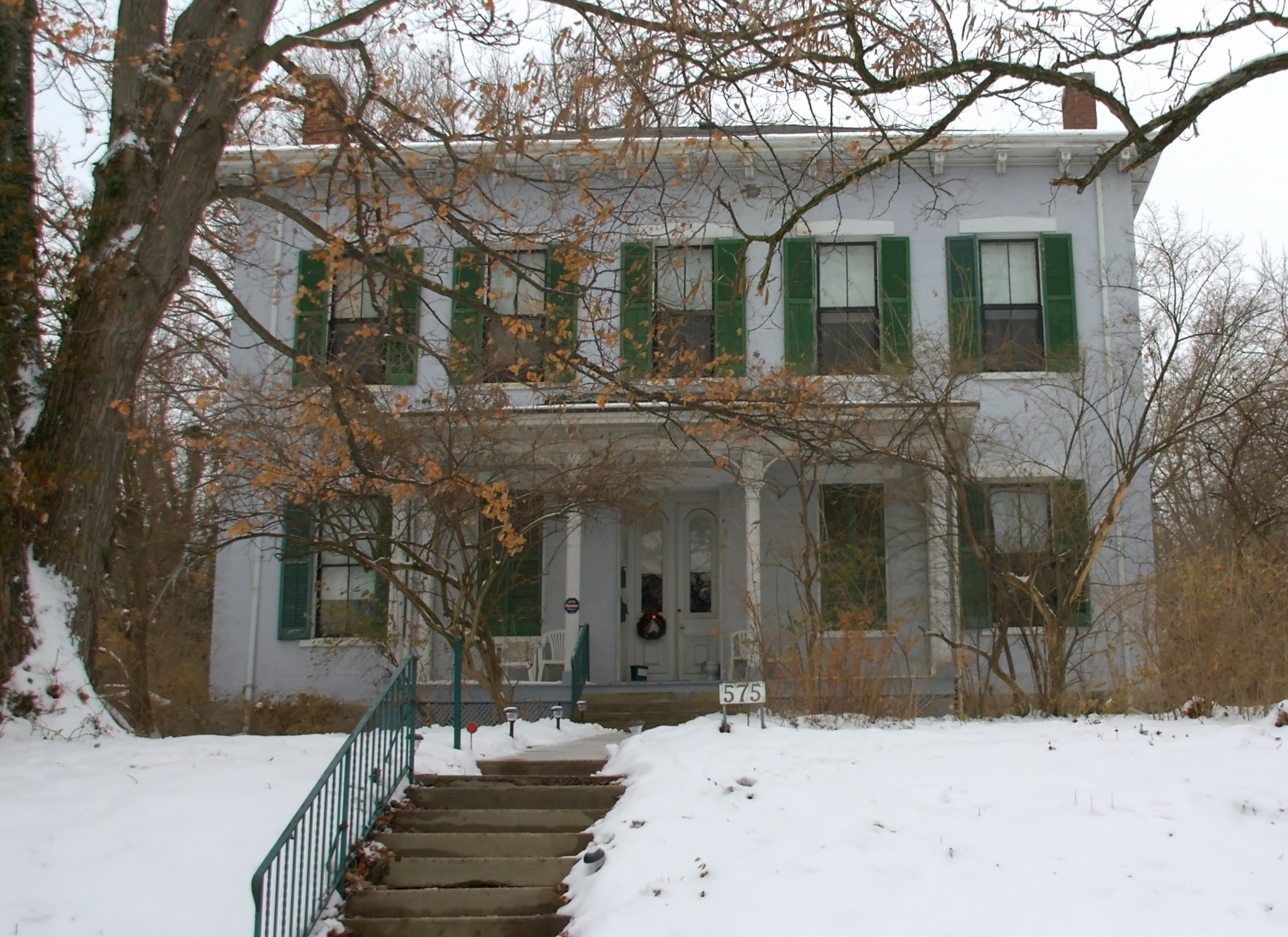
- Front of the house in winter

- Location within Ohio Location within the United States
- Location: 575 Harrison Ave., Hamilton, Ohio
- Coordinates: 39°24′21″N 84°35′11″W
- Area: Less than 1 acre (0.40 ha)
- Built: 1865
- Architect: Jacob Shaffer
- NRHP reference No.: 75001331
- Added to NRHP: April 3, 1975

Edgeton is a historic residence in the city of Hamilton, Ohio, United States. Built in the 1860s, its earliest residents were prominent businessmen in Hamilton, and it has been named a historic site.

Jacob Shaffer, the first resident, was a prominent Hamilton banker whose offices were located across the street from the courthouse downtown, and he also was interested in a flour mill and the city's street railway. He was personally involved in the construction of the house, which was completed in 1865; it remained in his possession for eighteen years, culminating in 1883 upon the sale of the property to Harrison Leib. Formerly a resident of Cincinnati, Leib was a broker for a sugar cane firm and operated the Edgeton Farm Dairy, the name of which he gave his house. Built of brick with elements of stone, the house features a central porch with shuttered windows surrounding the main entrance, as well as corbelling supporting the cornice at the edge of the roof. Two stories tall, the house is covered with a hip roof. It is surrounded by wide grounds landscaped to resemble a park.

In 1975, Edgeton was listed on the National Register of Historic Places, qualifying because of its historically significant architecture. It is one of sixteen Hamilton locations on the Register, and one of more than eighty countywide. Part of its significance derives from its placement in its neighborhood: one of western Hamilton's most prominent houses, it anchors the neighborhood's built environment both because of its architecture and because of its wide grounds.
