= Anderson–Shaffer House =

Historic house in Ohio, United States

- U.S. National Register of Historic Places
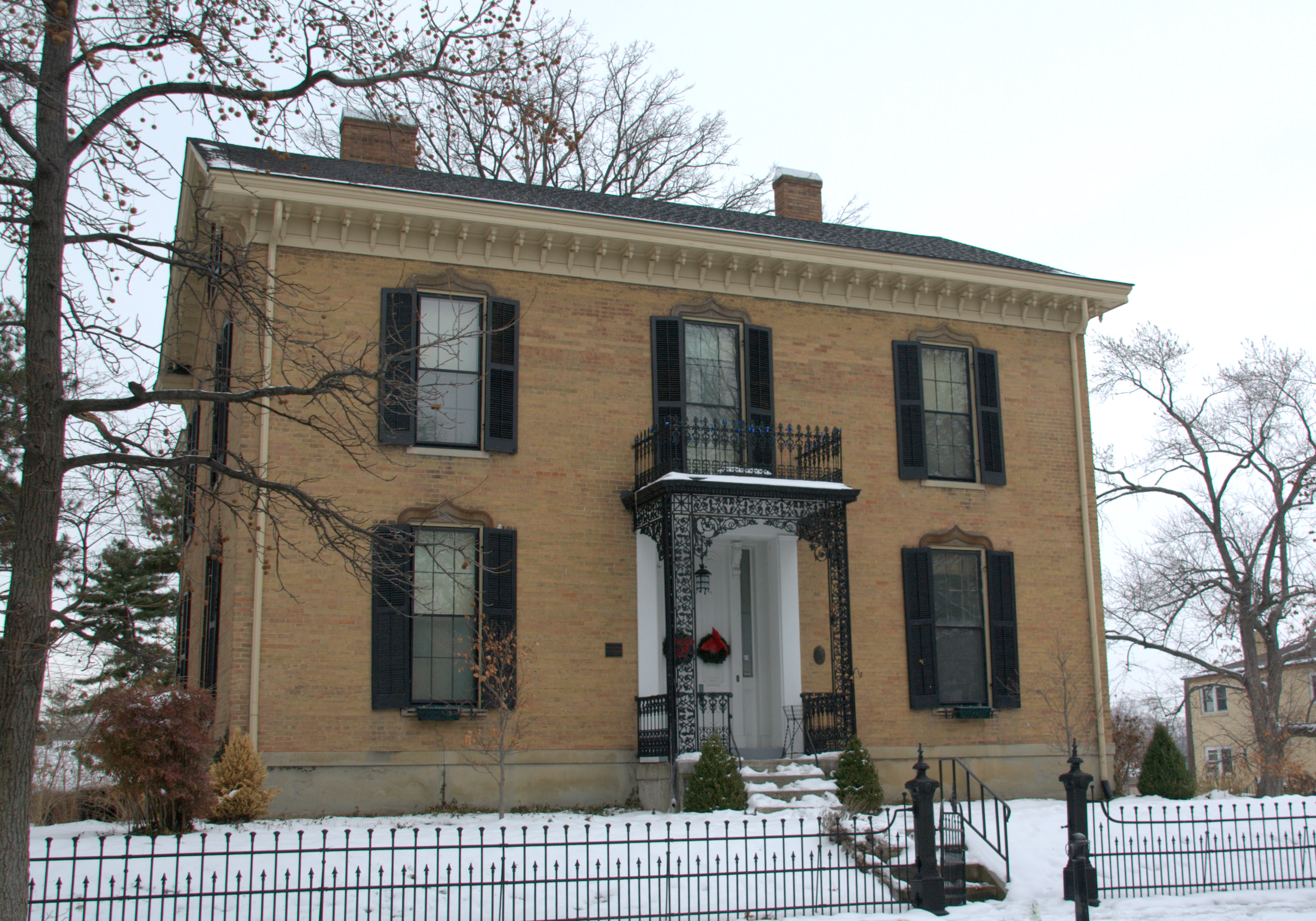
- Front of the house

- Location within Ohio Location within the United States
- Location: 404 Ross Ave., Hamilton, Ohio
- Coordinates: 39°24′15″N 84°34′17″W
- Area: Less than 1 acre (0.40 ha)
- Built: 1859
- Architect: Daniel Rumple
- Architectural style: Federal
- NRHP reference No.: 74001402
- Added to NRHP: January 18, 1974

The Anderson–Shaffer House is a historic residence in the city of Hamilton, Ohio, United States. Constructed in the middle of the nineteenth century, it was home to a succession of owners in its early years, and it has been named a historic site.

After years of farming in Butler County, Daniel Rumple moved into the county seat of Hamilton during the middle of the 19th century and bought a 50% share in a community hardware store. Needing a residence, he commissioned the construction of the present house, which was completed in 1859 by a team under the leadership of carpenter/bricklayer P.H. Gilbert. Following Rumple's death five years later, the property was purchased by William and Rachel Anderson, another prosperous business owner. Anderson had entered Hamilton's commercial circles with a leatherworking business, although he switched into the field of milling in 1853. The "Shaffer" component of the house's name is derived from George K. Shaffer, who married one of William Anderson's daughters and became a partner in his milling company in the 1880s.

Built of brick and covered with a slate roof, the Anderson–Shaffer House is surrounded by a decorative iron fence. A small iron porch shelters the main entrance, which is placed in the middle of the three-bay facade; windows are placed in the side bays of the first story and all three bays of the second. The side, narrower than the front, is divided into two bays with windows in each; it rises to a gable with a third-story window. Decorative corbelling lies under the edge of the roof, forming a cornice, while the roofline is punctuated by two chimneys. Besides the main entrance, one may leave the house through the middle of the three windows on the second story of the facade: it opens onto the roof of the porch, which is fenced with iron to prevent falls. Inside, the house is built with a floor plan based on a modified form of the letter "T". Among the interior features is a builder's mark on the banister along the stairway, placed by P.H. Gilbert.

In early 1974, the Anderson–Shaffer House was listed on the National Register of Historic Places, qualifying because of its historic architecture and because of its place as the home of a leading local citizen, William Anderson. It is one of more than eighty National Register-listed properties countywide.
