= Augspurger Grist Mill =

- U.S. National Register of Historic Places
- Location within Ohio Location within the United States
- Location: Wayne-Madison Rd. at Woodsdale, Ohio
- Coordinates: 39°25′48″N 84°28′38″W
- MPS: Augspurger Amish/Mennonite Settlement TR
- NRHP reference No.: 84000211
- Added to NRHP: 1984-11-01

Augspurger Grist Mill is a registered historic building in Woodsdale, Butler County, Ohio, listed in the National Register on 1984-11-01.

It was a three-story building with a full basement floor built into a bank. It is vernacular in style but with Italianate influences. Its gable end facade features brick pilasters dividing it into three bays, and doorways to permit grain loading in the central bay of each level. The grist mill was part of a company town of the Augspurger Paper Company.

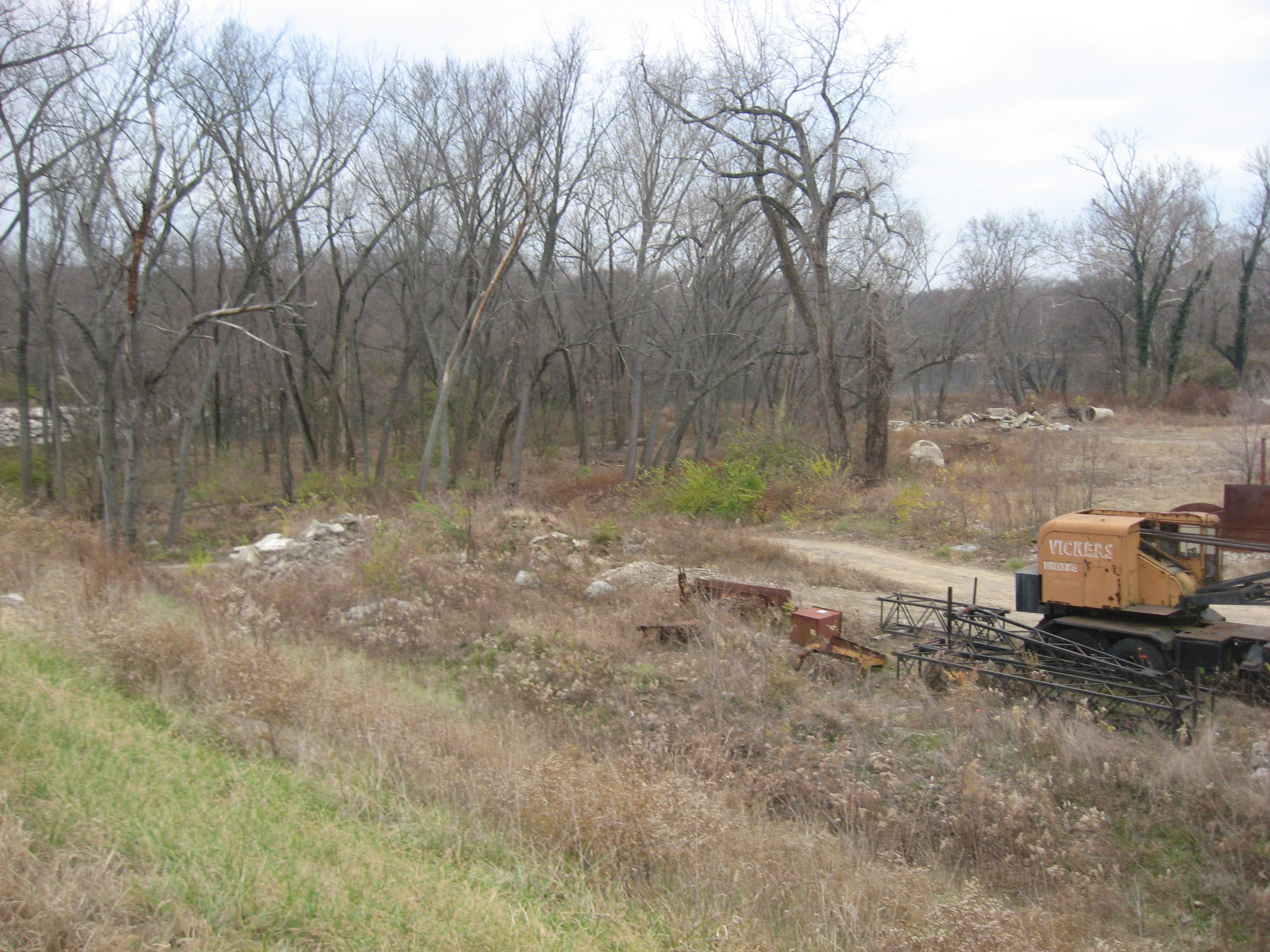
Site of the mill, in 2012

Based on a photo of the site, it appears to have been demolished by 2012.
