= Thomas Select School =

- U.S. National Register of Historic Places
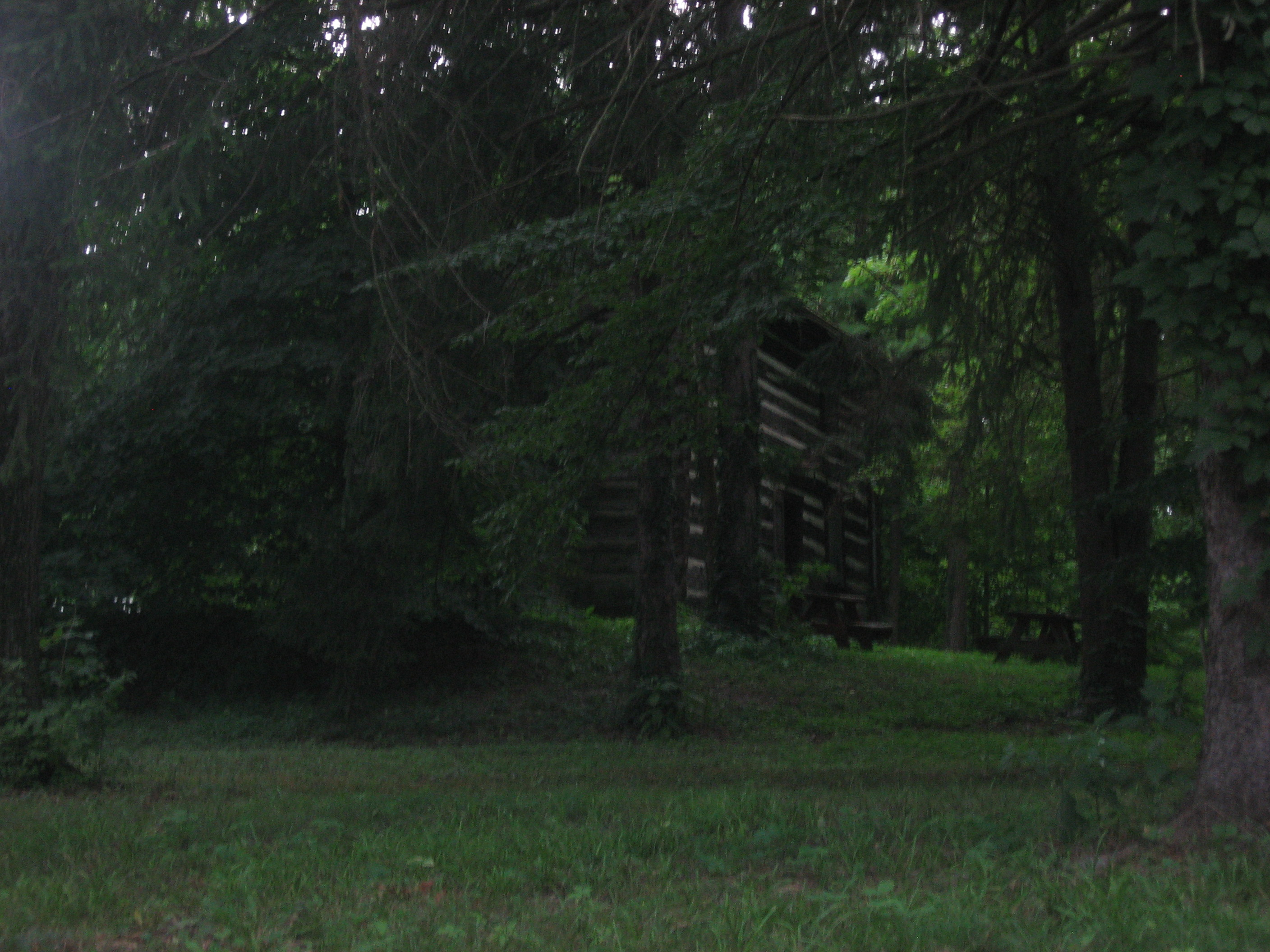
- Roadside view of the school

- Location within Ohio Location within the United States
- Location: 3637 Millville-Shandon Rd., Shandon, Ohio
- Coordinates: 39°19′42″N 84°42′52″W
- Area: 2 acres (0.81 ha)
- Built: 1810
- NRHP reference No.: 77001046
- Added to NRHP: April 11, 1977

The Thomas Select School is a historic log building in rural Butler County, Ohio, United States. Constructed in 1810, the building has seen numerous uses, ranging from church to school to house. It has been named a historic site.

Numerous log schoolhouses were built throughout early Ohio, but few have survived; the Thomas Select School is important partly because of its very existence. Built in 1810, the school was associated with a Welsh immigrant church in the small community of Shandon. In its early years, the Whitewater Congregational Church worshipped in both English and Welsh and supported two ministers; one of them, Thomas Thomas, also taught school in order to earn a living. Using their home as the schoolhouse, Thomas and his wife taught both girls and boys. As the house was a parsonage, it remained in the church's ownership until 1885, when the trustees sold it to a family named Robinson, which owned the building until selling it in 1947. Since that time, it has been used as a summer house.

Two stories tall, the school is a log cabin measuring 30 by 22 feet (9.1 m × 6.7 m), which makes it larger than most log schoolhouses of the period. Since its early days, the building has been given an asphalt roof and various elements of stone. Among its distinctive components is the presence of "steeple notches" in the logs: these are V-shaped cuts made in the logs to enable them to fit together. Notches in log cabins are typically of other shapes, making the steeple notch rare and dateable; most log buildings in the eastern United States with this kind of notch were built before 1800.

In 1977, the Thomas Select School was listed on the National Register of Historic Places, qualifying both because of its architecture and because of its place in the area's history. It is one of more than eighty National Register properties in Butler County.
