= John Augspurger Farm No. 1 =

Historic house in Ohio, United States

- U.S. National Register of Historic Places
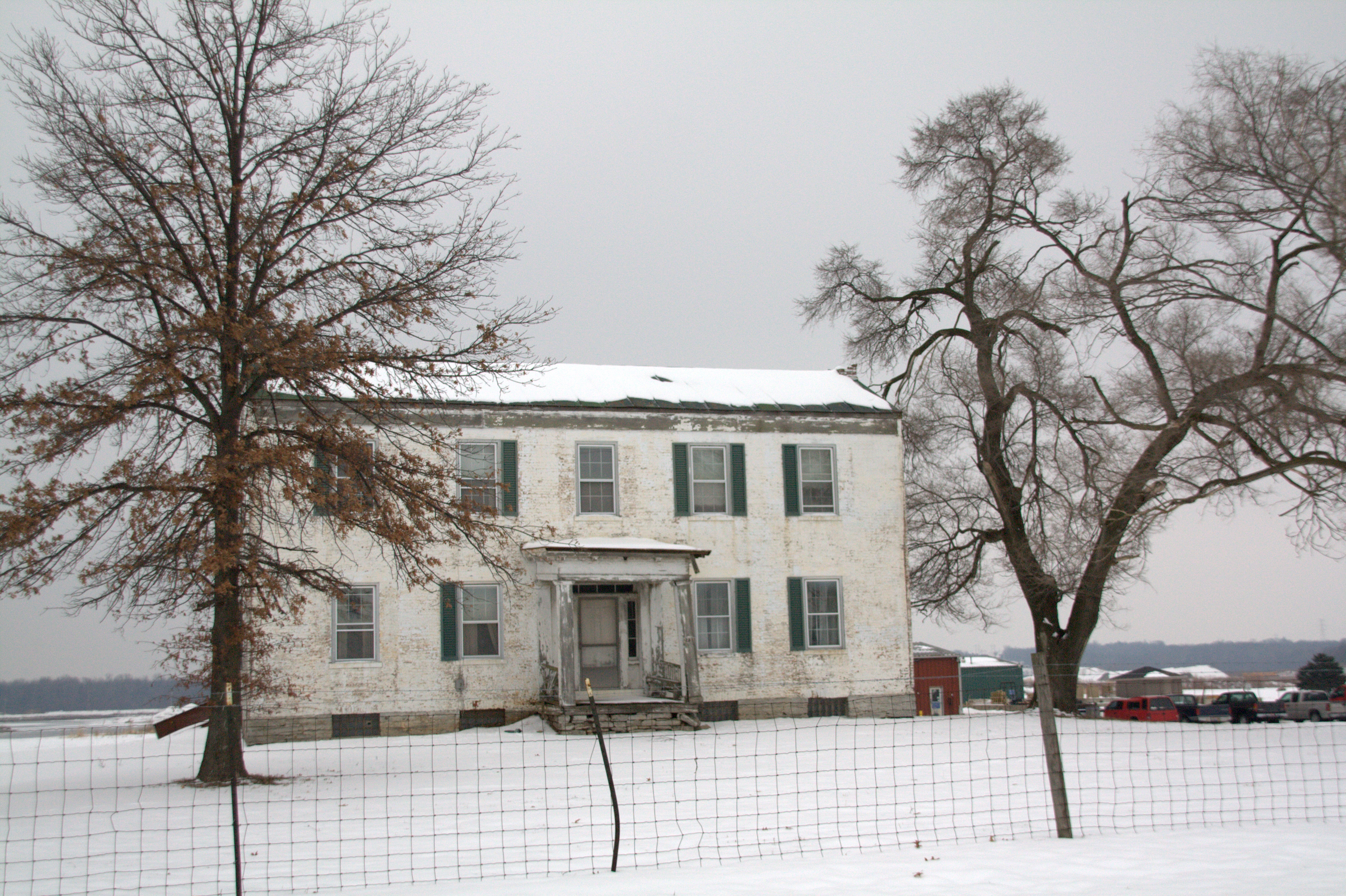

- Location within Ohio Location within the United States
- Nearest city: Trenton, Ohio
- Coordinates: 39°27′20.66″N 84°26′53.97″W
- MPS: Augspurger Amish/Mennonite Settlement TR
- NRHP reference No.: 84002901
- Added to NRHP: 1984-08-03

John Augspurger Farm No. 1 is a registered historic building near Trenton, Ohio, listed in the National Register on 1984-08-03.

== Historic uses ==
- Single Dwelling
