= Henry Maltby House =

Historic house in Oxford, Ohio

- U.S. National Register of Historic Places
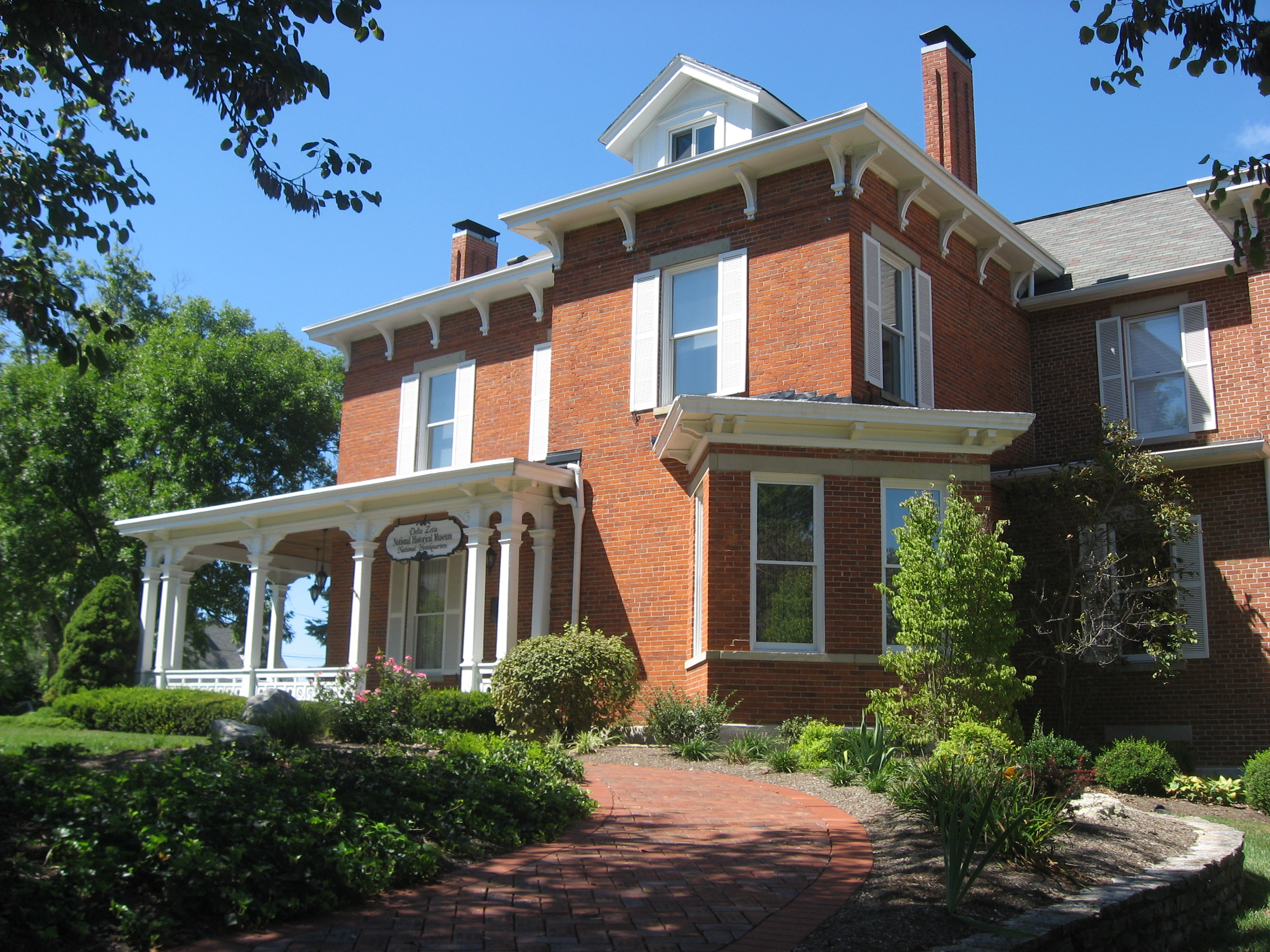
- Site of the Maltby House, now occupied by Delta Zeta offices

- Location within Ohio Location within the United States
- Location: 216 E. Church St, Oxford, Ohio
- Coordinates: 39°30′42″N 84°44′19″W
- Area: 0 acres (0 ha)
- Built: 1852
- Architectural style: Greek Revival
- NRHP reference No.: 79001789
- Added to NRHP: November 29, 1979

The Henry Maltby House was a historic house near the campus of Miami University in Oxford, Ohio, United States. Built in the 1850s, it was once home to a prominent minister in the community. Important partly for its architecture, it was eventually relegated to student housing before being demolished. Before its destruction, it was named a historic site.

Born in 1806 in Paris, New York, Henry Maltby moved to Oxford in 1848, after serving churches in Louisville and Cincinnati. He became the minister of Oxford's First Presbyterian Church and then of the Third Presbyterian Church, at which he remained until 1856. During his time in Oxford, he helped to found the Oxford Female Institute, and he was one of the most prominent figures in what was then a largely Presbyterian community. Maltby built his house in 1852, and for many years after he left, it remained a single-family residence, although late in its history it was turned into apartments for Miami University students. It has since been destroyed.

Built with wooden weatherboarded walls, the Maltby House had a frame structure, a stone foundation, and a shingled hip roof. Two stories tall, the house was divided into two bays on the front and three on the side. Extending across the whole width of the front was a porch with various Greek Revival details, including a large entablature under the cornice and fluted columns in the Doric order. The house was expanded at an unknown time by the addition of a small rear wing as well as a small bracketed roof over the side entrance.

In 1976, the Maltby House was recorded by the Ohio Historic Inventory, a historic preservation program of the Ohio Historical Society. At that time, it was deemed eligible for addition to the National Register of Historic Places, and the surrounding neighborhood was considered a likely candidate for National Register historic district designation. Three years later, the house was added to the Register, qualifying because of its architecture, its place in local history, and its connection to Maltby. It remains on the Register, despite its destruction.
