= Christian Ehresman Farm =

Historic house in Ohio, United States

- U.S. National Register of Historic Places
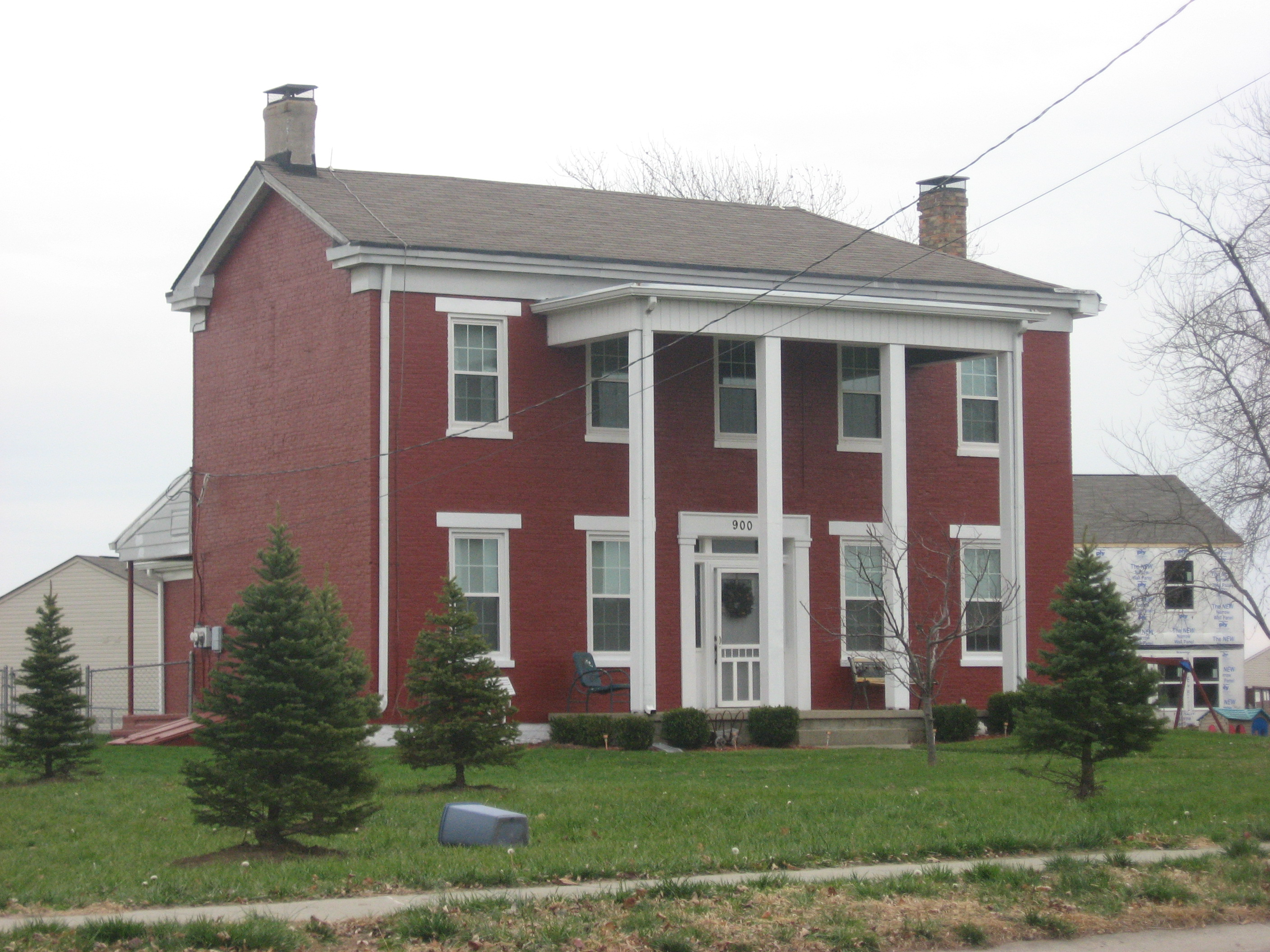
- Front and northern side

- Location within Ohio Location within the United States
- Nearest city: Trenton, Ohio
- Coordinates: 39°28′12.41″N 84°27′12.53″W
- MPS: Augspurger Amish/Mennonite Settlement TR
- NRHP reference No.: 84002903
- Added to NRHP: 1984-08-03

Christian Ehresman Farm is a registered historic building near Trenton, Ohio, listed in the National Register on 1984-08-03.

== Historic uses ==
- Single Dwelling

== History and Significance ==
This house was built by Christian Ehresman, an Amish Mennonite who came to America in 1840. According to the records, Ehresman bought the land and built the house in I867. When he died in 1868 before the house was completely finished, the farm went to his son. Otto. The farm remained in Mennonite hands until 1924.
