= Fairfield Township Works I =

Archaeological site in Ohio, United States

- U.S. National Register of Historic Places
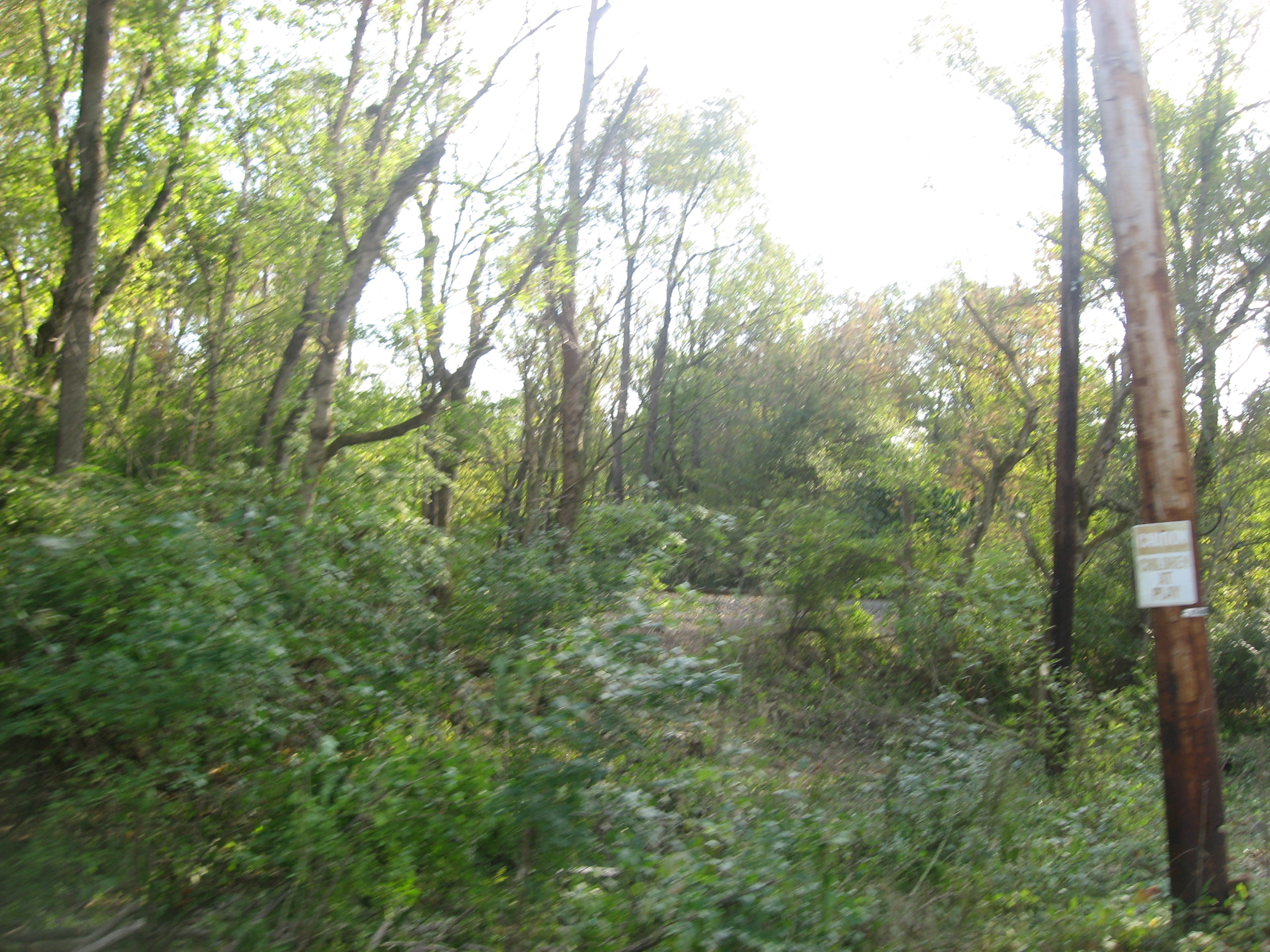
- Looking up toward the site
- Nearest city: Hamilton, Ohio
- NRHP reference No.: 71000631
- Added to NRHP: 1971-11-05

Fairfield Township Works I is a registered historic site near Hamilton, Ohio, listed in the National Register on 1971-11-05.

== Historic uses ==
- Graves/Burials
- Ceremonial Complex
