= John Augspurger Farm No. 2 =

Historic house in Ohio, United States

- U.S. National Register of Historic Places
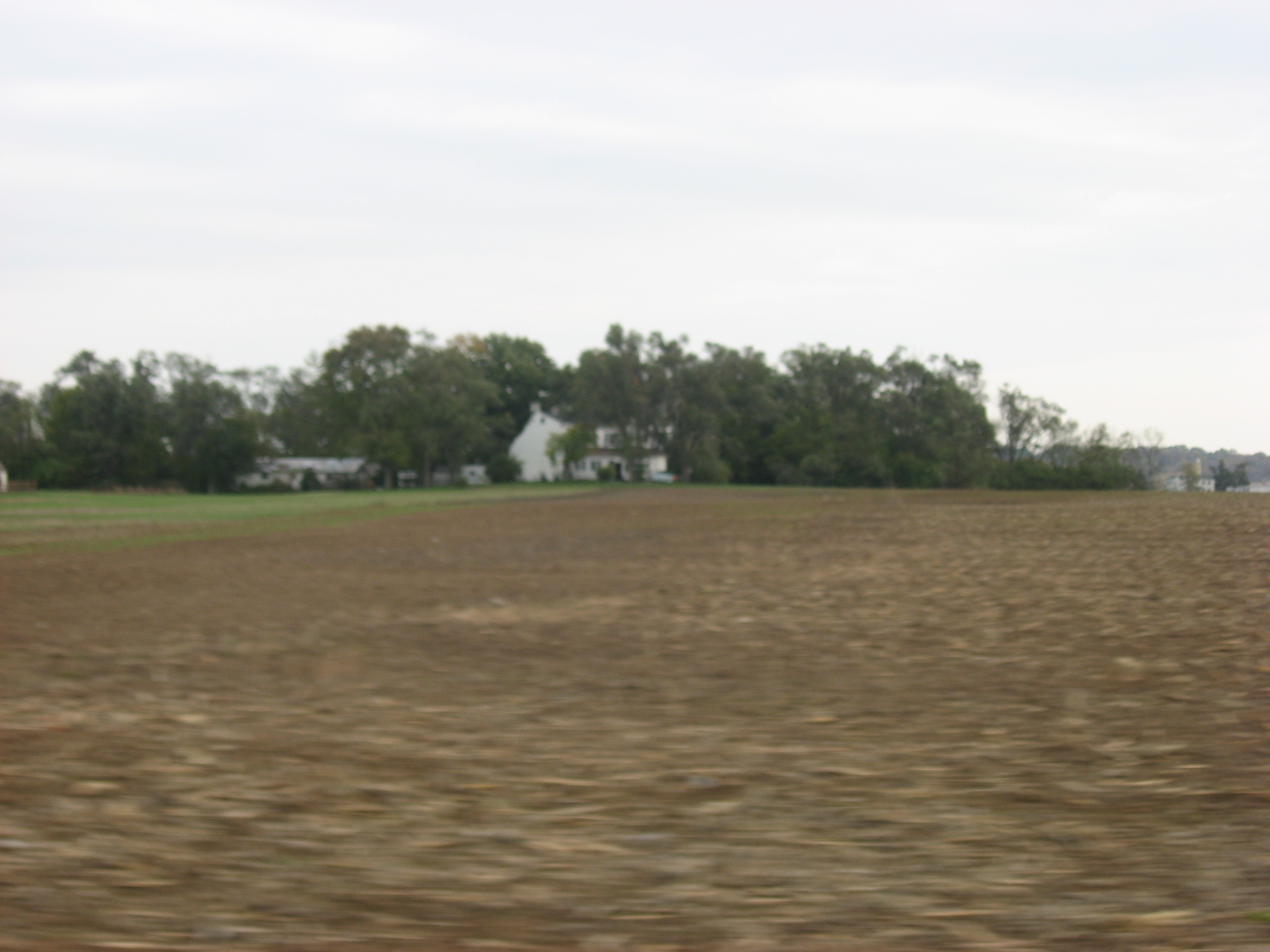
- View from the west

- Location within Ohio
- Nearest city: Trenton, Ohio
- Coordinates: 39°28′2.02″N 84°27′46.98″W
- MPS: Augspurger Amish/Mennonite Settlement TR
- NRHP reference No.: 84000208
- Added to NRHP: 1984-11-01

John Augspurger Farm No. 2 is a historic building near Trenton, Ohio, listed on the National Register of Historic Places in 1984. The two-story, rectangular farmhouse represents part of the grouping of the Amish Mennonites' settlement buildings. It is designed in the I-house style in an Amish house type and was built between 1846 and 1853.

== Historic uses ==
- Single Dwelling
