= Symmes Mission Chapel =

Historic church in Ohio, United States

- U.S. National Register of Historic Places
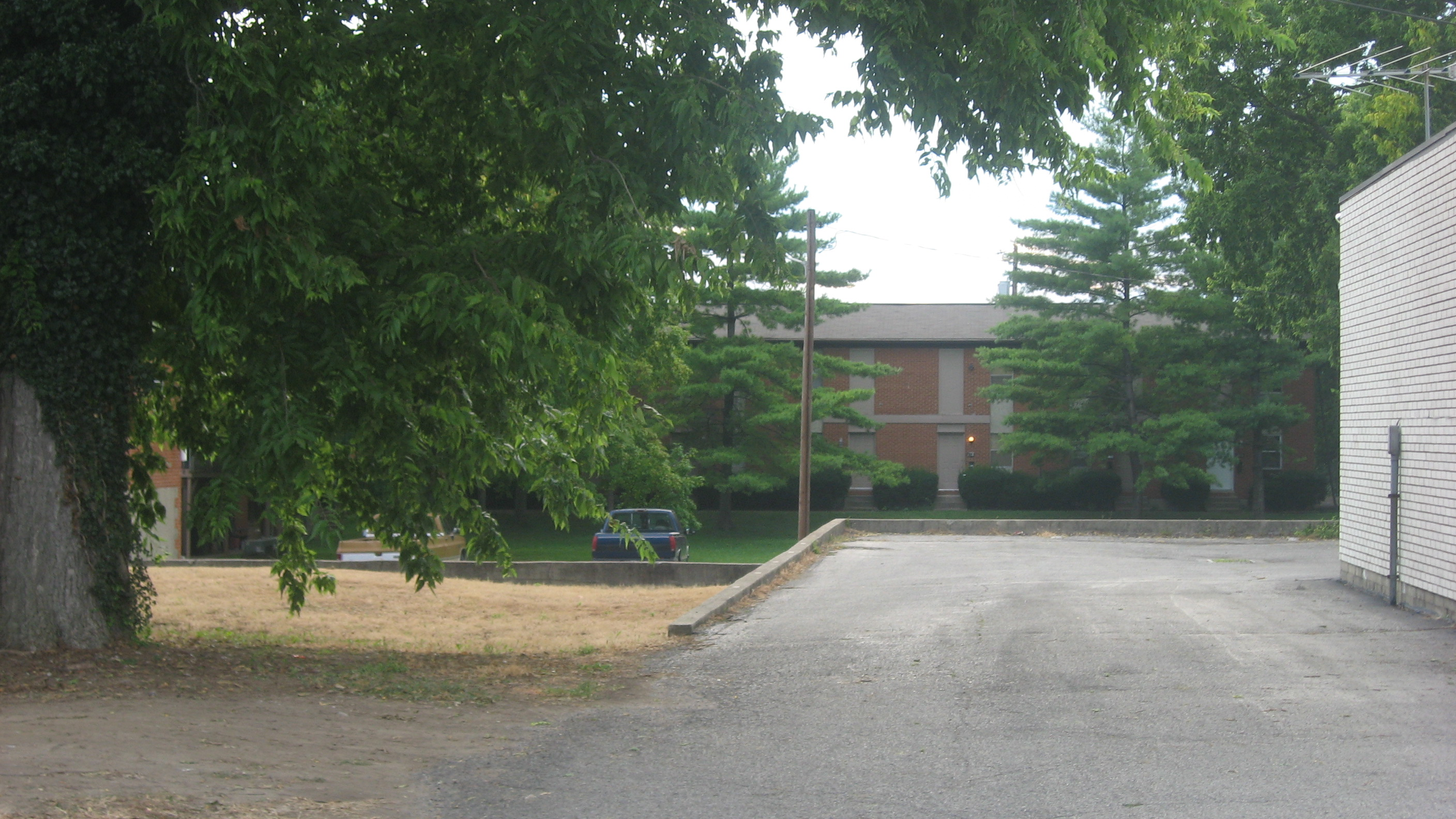
- Site of the chapel

- Location within Ohio Location within the United States
- Location: 5139 Pleasant Ave., Fairfield Ohio
- Coordinates: 39°20′22″N 84°33′37″W
- Area: Less than 1 acre (0.40 ha)
- Built: 1843
- Architectural style: Vernacular
- NRHP reference No.: 80002946
- Added to NRHP: June 12, 1980

The Symmes Mission Chapel was a historic church building in the city of Fairfield, Ohio, United States. A simple structure constructed in the 1840s, it was named a historic site in the 1980s, but it is no longer standing.

== History ==
One of the leading members of the congregation that built the Symmes Mission Chapel was Benjamin Symmes, who along with Abram Huston and John Mesler helped to found the Old School Presbyterian congregation in the late 1830s. Most of the members were drawn from Presbyterian churches in Hamilton, Springdale, and Ross, so the congregation was founded in the locality known as Symmes Corners in order to be convenient for all of the members. Shortly after the organization of the congregation, the original church building was constructed at a cost of $1,180 on land donated by Benjamin Symmes, seemingly in 1843. It was the primary home of the eighty-member congregation for some years, but by the 1850s the majority of the members lived southward in far northern Hamilton County, so a new building was constructed near Pleasant Run, and the old building was ultimately abandoned by the congregation. However, it remained in use by others in the community until 1968, either as a church or as a school, and it had come into the possession of Fairfield's historical society by 1980.

== Architecture ==
A simple weatherboarded building, the chapel was two stories tall with a shallow gabled roof. A doorway was placed in the middle of the front, with one window above and to each side, while the sides of the building, much longer than the front, were pierced with a few windows in the middle and rear. Built without a basement, the building rested on a foundation of ashlar, while the roof was ultimately covered with asphalt shingles. Inside, a stairway in the rear (near the pulpit) permitted access to the upper floor. The sanctuary was decorated with ornamental woodwork, including bullseye designs, while much of the interior was covered with tongue and groove panelling. A small vernacular building, it lacked other significant elements, such as traditional ecclesiastical architecture and virtually all ornamentation traditionally applied to churches.

== Historic site ==
In 1980, the church was listed on the National Register of Historic Places, qualifying because of its historically significant architecture. Far from qualifying for grand architecture, it qualified because of its simple design: it represented what was once a common country church design, free of ornament and built for functional purposes. By that time, it was one of very few pre-Civil War buildings remaining in Fairfield, which was quickly becoming more and more of an exurb in the Cincinnati metropolitan area. Six years later, the church was recorded by personnel from Butler County's Citizens for Historic and Preservation Services as part of a historic preservation survey, the Ohio Historic Inventory. Noting the church's place among contemporary commercial development, the surveyor observed deterioration in both interior and exterior, and by that time the building was seemingly close to collapse. Today, the building is gone, with an empty lot occupying its place, although the historical society still owned the empty lot as of the end of 2013.
