= Fitz Randolph–Rogers House =

Historic house in Ohio, United States

- U.S. National Register of Historic Places
- Location within Ohio Location within the United States
- Location: 5467 Liberty-Fairfield Road, Hamilton, Ohio
- Coordinates: 39°25′8″N 84°28′45″W
- Area: Less than 1 acre (0.40 ha)
- Built: 1840
- Architectural style: Greek Revival
- NRHP reference No.: 78002014
- Added to NRHP: February 8, 1978

The Fitz Randolph–Rogers House is a historic farmhouse located outside the city of Hamilton in Butler County, Ohio, United States. Constructed during the 1840s, it was home to a well-known diarist of the 1860s, and it has been designated a historic site.

Liberty Township farmer Benjamin Fitz Randolph arranged for the house's construction in 1840, although the project was not finished until 1844. Here he farmed and ran a tannery until 1860, when a widow, Lydia Rogers, bought the property. Her family inhabited it until selling it in 1931. While living with her mother in the 1860s, Rogers' daughter Sarah Elizabeth Rogers kept a careful diary that made her a significant source for period social history after it was published in the journal of the Ohio Historical Society.

Fitz Randolph arranged for a composite structure; the house is primarily a brick building, although elements of stone are also present. Like many other period buildings, the house is built in the Greek Revival style of architecture, but unlike most such houses, it is built on a hillside. The one-story facade is divided into five bays, with the central bay being occupied by an elaborate entrance: four columns, two on each side, form a post and lintel structure around the doorway, and a transom light is placed above the door. Stairs provide access to a stoop by the raised main entrance, and a frieze is placed immediately below the edge of the roof.

In 1978, the Fitz Randolph–Rogers House was listed on the National Register of Historic Places, qualifying both because of its historically significant architecture and because of its important place in local history.
