= Roberts Mound =

Archaeological site in Ohio, United States

- U.S. National Register of Historic Places
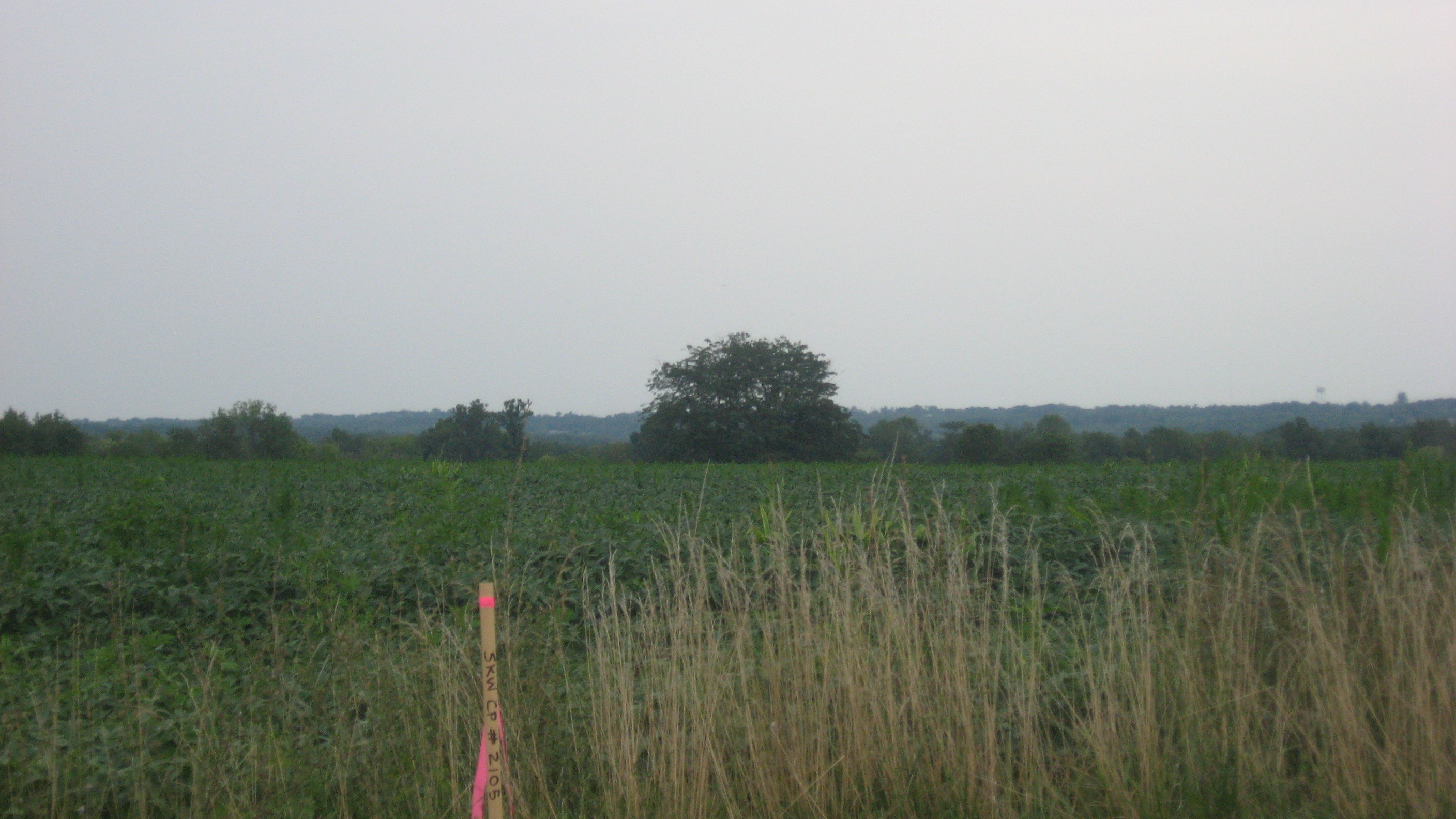
- View from the south; the mound lies under the tallest clump of trees

- Location within Ohio Location within the United States
- Location: Section 36 of Reily Township, northwest of Auburn
- Nearest city: Auburn, Ohio
- Coordinates: 39°23′39.3″N 84°42′40″W
- Area: 12 acres (4.9 ha)
- NRHP reference No.: 75001329
- Added to NRHP: March 27, 1975

The Roberts Mound is a Native American mound in the southwestern part of the U.S. state of Ohio, United States. Located northwest of Auburn in Butler County, the mound sits in Section 36 of Reily Township; it is the only mound in the far southeastern part of the township.

Built in the shape of a cone, the Roberts Mound is believed to have been built during the Woodland period. Many similar mounds and other types of earthworks are located in the vicinity of the Roberts Mound, but unlike most of them, it has never been excavated. While the lack of artifacts prevents the culture of the builders from being known with certainty, the lack of disturbance has caused it to be ranked among the most well-preserved mounds in the region.

In recognition of its archaeological value, the Roberts Mound was listed on the National Register of Historic Places in 1975. Five other archaeological sites in Butler County were placed on the National Register in the same year.
