= Demoret Mound =

Archaeological site in Ohio, United States

- U.S. National Register of Historic Places
- Location within Ohio Location within the United States
- Location: Southern side of Hamilton-New London Rd., west of its junction with Layhigh Rd.
- Nearest city: Ross, Ohio
- Coordinates: 39°19′58″N 84°41′2″W
- Area: 5 acres (2.0 ha)
- NRHP reference No.: 75001337
- Added to NRHP: October 21, 1975

The Demoret Mound is a Native American mound in the southwestern part of the U.S. state of Ohio. Located west of Ross in Butler County, the mound appears to have been constructed by Native Americans of the Woodland period. Although the Demoret Mound has not been excavated, it is likely to contain evidence of funerary practices; excavation of similar mounds has revealed postholes of structures believed to be houses or ceremonial buildings. Consequently, the archaeological value of the mound is significant; excavation might reveal information about practices not found in other mounds. In recognition of its archaeological value, the Demoret Mound was added to the National Register of Historic Places in 1975.
