= High Street Commercial Block =

- U.S. National Register of Historic Places
- U.S. Historic district
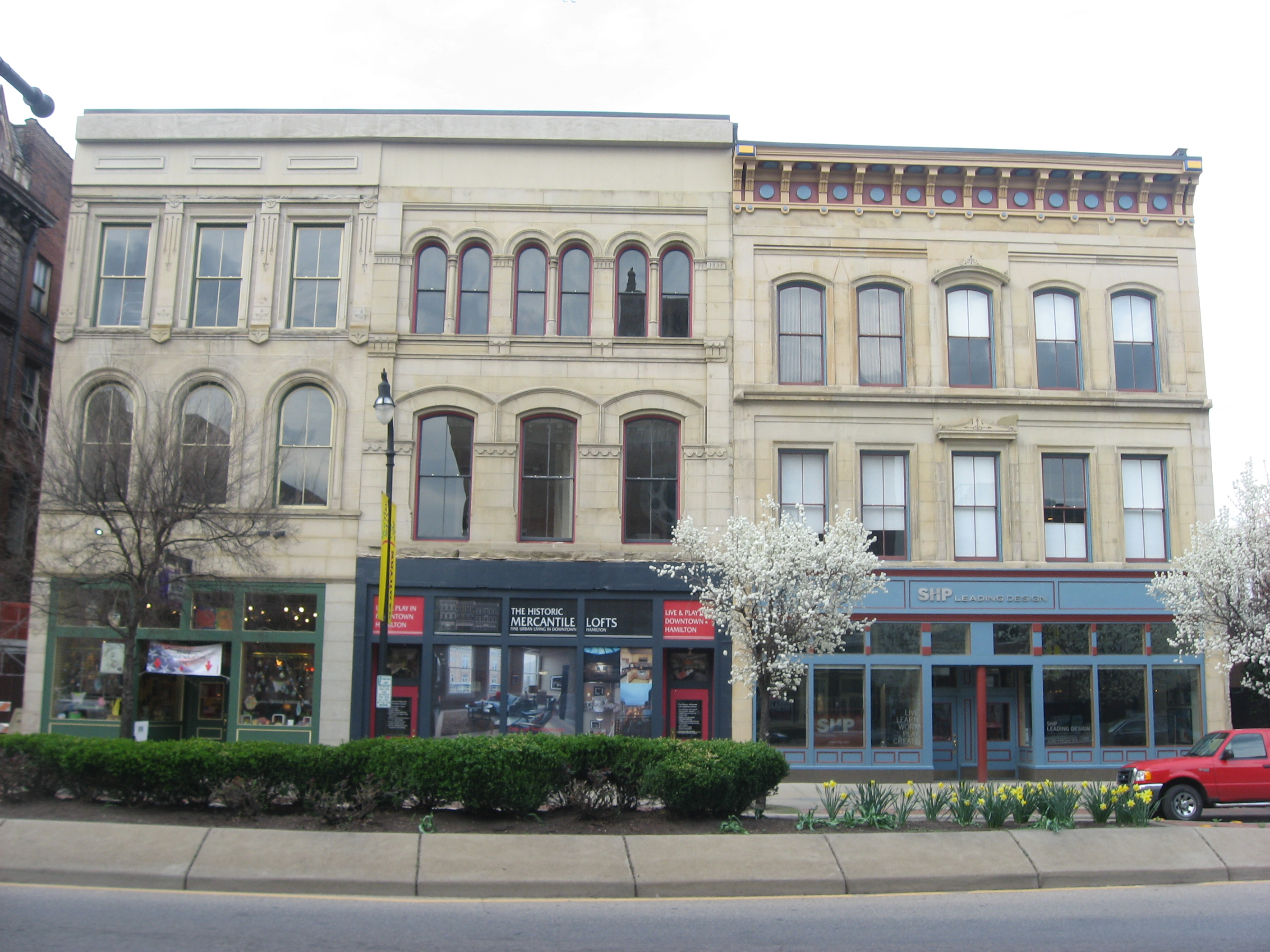
- Front of the block

- Location within Ohio Location within the United States
- Location: 216-226, 228, 232, and 236 High St., Hamilton, Ohio
- Coordinates: 39°23′59″N 84°33′39″W
- Area: 0.4 acres (0.16 ha)
- Built: 1874
- Architectural style: Italianate
- NRHP reference No.: 04000113 (original); 14000292 (increase)

Significant dates
- Added to NRHP: March 3, 2004
- Boundary increase: May 23, 2014

The High Street Commercial Block is a miniature historic district in downtown Hamilton, Ohio, United States. Three buildings compose the block: the old Second National Bank Building, the Howell-Sohngen Building, and McCrory's. All are three-story masonry buildings in some form of the Italianate style, and while all feature arched windows on their upper stories, the styles of arches and the varied employment of rectangular windows, together with their varied cornices, causes the styling to be diverse. Both the left and central buildings have facades divided into three bays on their second and third stories; the left building has one window in each, while the central possesses one window in the second story bays and two smaller ones in the third. The right building, on the other hand, is a wider structure with a five-bay facade. The complex sits across the street from the later Second National Bank Building, an Art Deco structure from the 1930s.

The rightmost building in the block is the former location of McCrory's Variety Store; it occupied the building circa 1930, while previous occupants' names are unknown. One of Hamilton's few Neo-Renaissance buildings, it is built of brick with a stone foundation and basement, and covered with a flat roof. Stone covers much of the exterior, which is divided into five bays by its prominent arched windows. Nothing substantial remains of the original first-story exterior, which has been profoundly modified since construction in 1875. Higher stories retain a greater degree of integrity, due to components such as a metal entablature, a cornice supported by brackets. In 1983, the building was evaluated by the Ohio Historic Inventory, a historic preservation program of the Ohio Historical Society; although it was deemed to be in good condition with no substantial dangers, it was deemed ineligible for any type of federal historic site designation. Nevertheless, it was included in the High Street Commercial Block when the block was named a historic district and listed on the National Register of Historic Places in 2004; the district qualified both because of its architecture and because of its place in local history. The district was expanded in 2014 to include 216-226 High Street.
