= Lane's Mill Historic Buildings =

- U.S. National Register of Historic Places
- U.S. Historic district
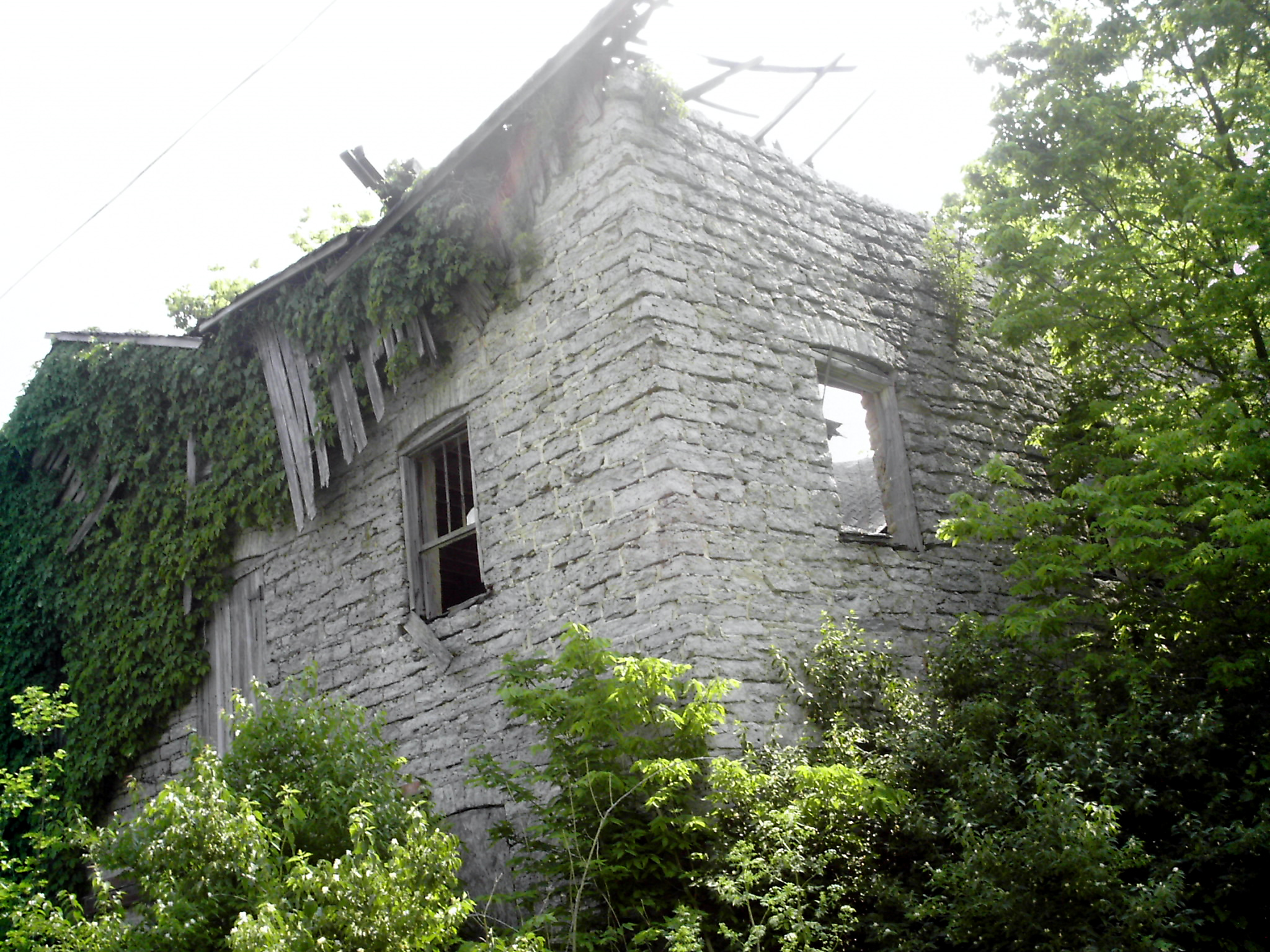

- Location within Ohio Location within the United States
- Nearest city: Oxford, Butler County, Ohio
- Coordinates: 39°28′57″N 84°41′32″W
- Area: 27 acres (11 ha)
- Built: 1848
- Architect: Elliott, William
- NRHP reference No.: 80002950
- Added to NRHP: October 03, 1980

Lane's Mill was a gristmill, sawmill and fulling mill on Four Mile Creek in Section 31 of Milford Township, Butler County, Ohio.

The abandoned mill is on Lanes Mill Road, north of Wallace Road. It is within two miles of the present corporate limit of Oxford, Ohio.

== History ==
The original mill was built about 1816 by Isiah Bryant and John Wallace, who also operated the mill for several years. It was rebuilt in 1850 by William Elliott (or Elliot) as a three-story mill, and its owners included James Smiley and later his son-in-law, William L. Lane of Oxford, whose name remains attached to the mill and the road.

The Lane's Mill Historic Buildings, 3884 Wallace Road, were added to the National Register of Historic Places in 1980. The Manrod family owned and operated the farm complex after the 1880s.
