= Frederick Augspurger Farm =

Historic house in Ohio, United States

- U.S. National Register of Historic Places
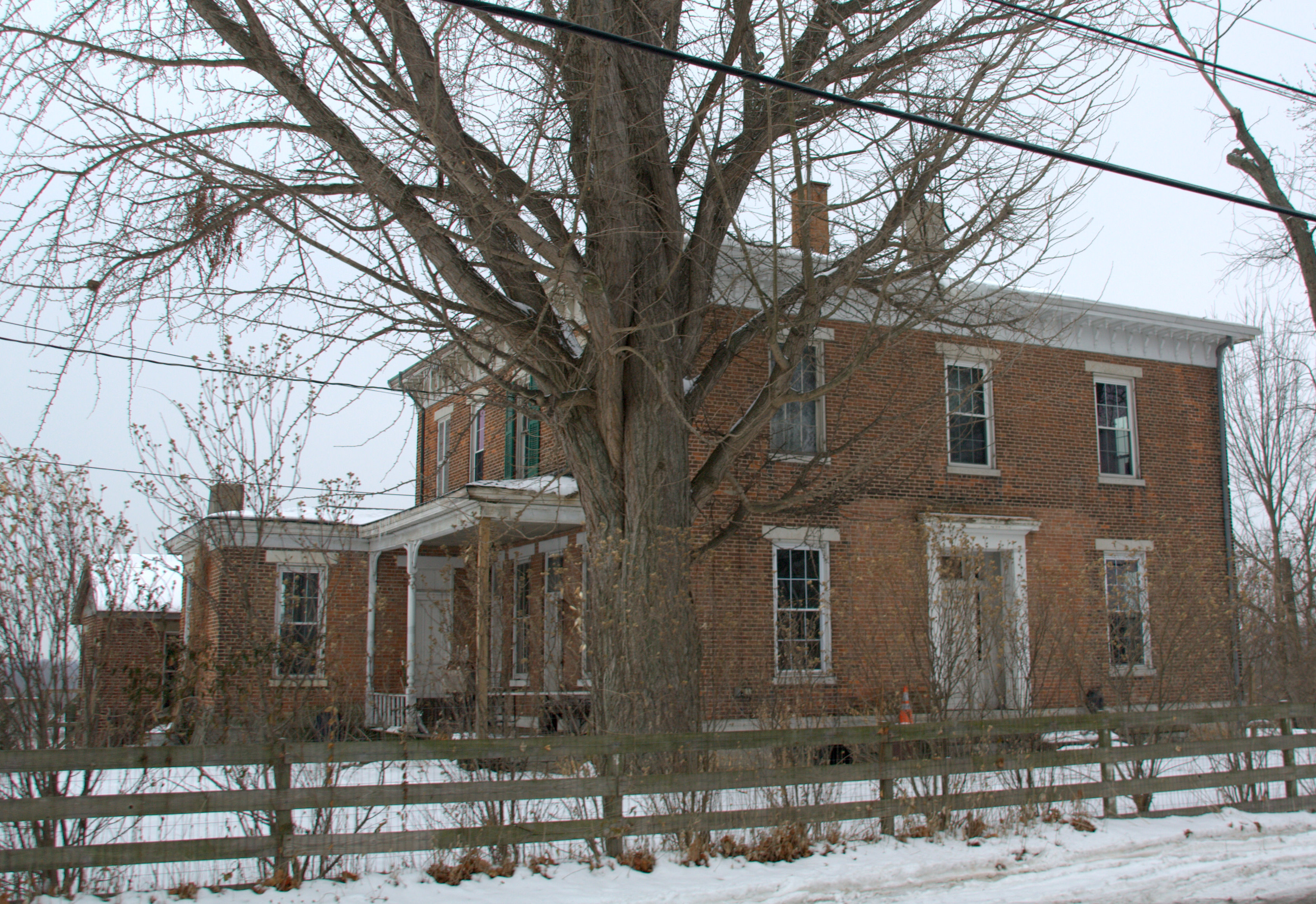

- Location within Ohio Location within the United States
- Interactive map showing the location of Frederick Augsburger House
- Nearest city: Trenton, Ohio
- Coordinates: 39°26′21.33″N 84°28′34.25″W
- MPS: Augspurger Amish/Mennonite Settlement TR
- NRHP reference No.: 84002900
- Added to NRHP: 1984-08-03

Frederick Augspurger Farm is a group of registered historic buildings near Trenton, Ohio, listed in the National Register on 1984-08-03. It consists of the house, the bank barn, the smokehouse, and the summer kitchen.

== History ==
The land for the property was purchased by Christian Augspurger from John Holly in 1847. The land went from his son, John Augspurger, to Frederick Augspurger in 1849. The house itself was built in 1865–1870, with two stories and a truncated hip roof. The farm was sold out of Mennonite hands by 1899, after the passing of Frederick Augspurger.
