= Union Township Works II =

Historic place in Ohio, United States

- U.S. National Register of Historic Places
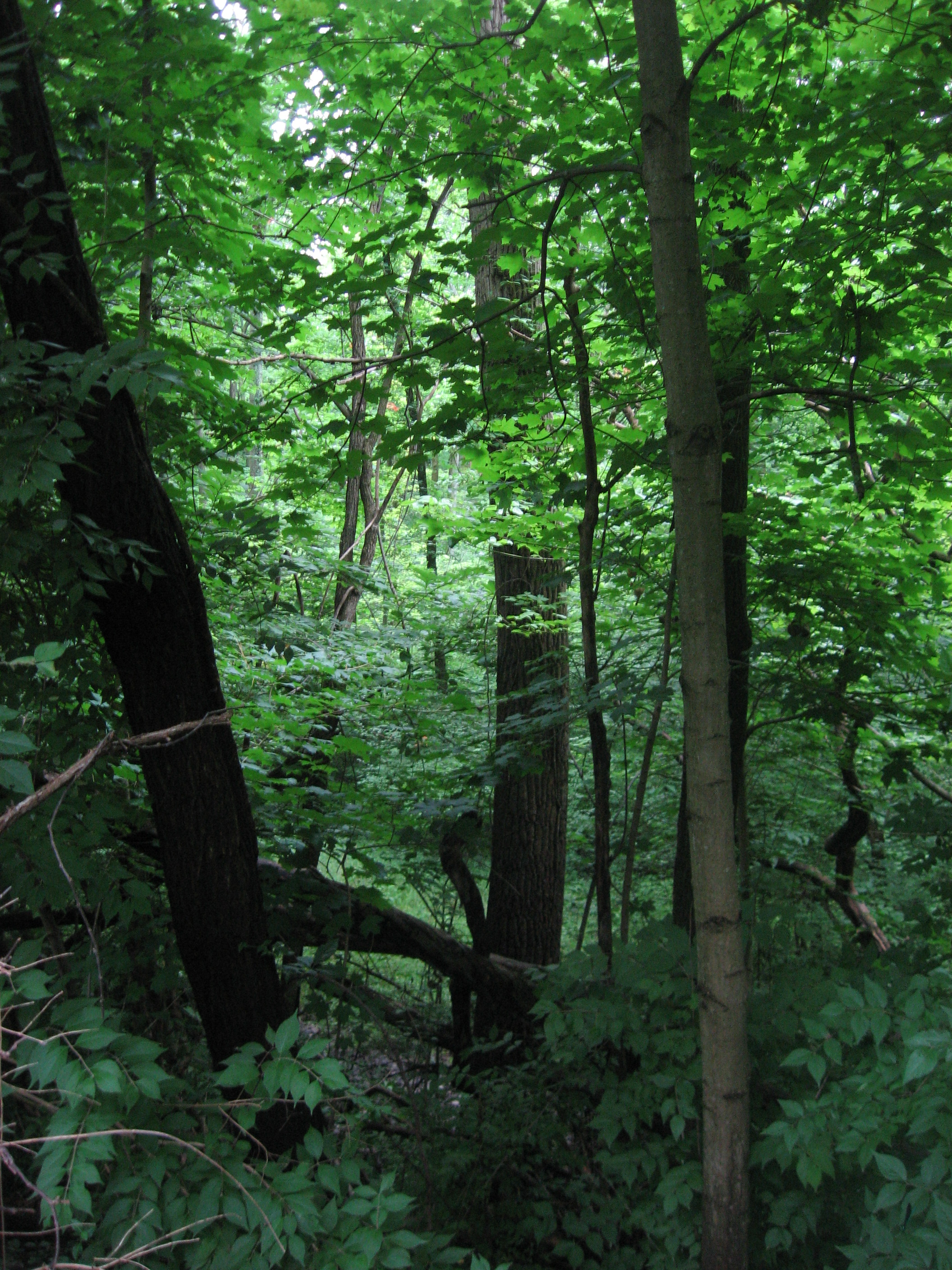
- Looking down from Dimmick Road

- Location within Ohio Location within the United States
- Location: Southern side of Dimmick Rd. on the eastern side of Sharon Creek
- Nearest city: Pisgah, Ohio
- Coordinates: 39°18′28″N 84°22′3″W
- NRHP reference No.: 71000635
- Added to NRHP: 1971-10-07

Union Township Works II is a registered historic site near Pisgah, Ohio, listed in the National Register on October 7, 1971.

== Historic uses ==
- Graves/Burials
