= Williamson Mound Archeological District =

Archaeological site in Ohio, United States

- U.S. National Register of Historic Places
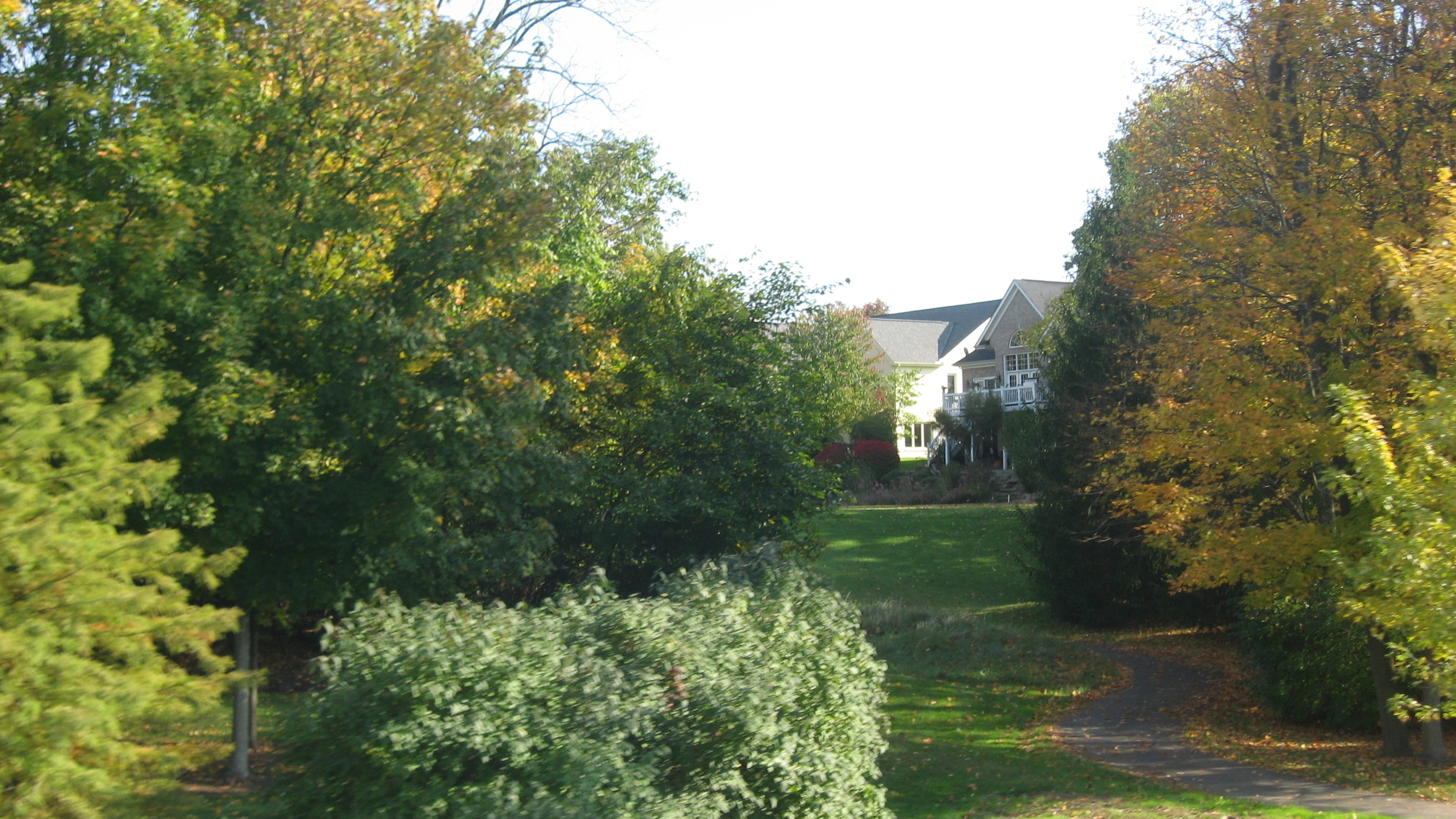
- View from the west

- Location within Ohio Location within the United States
- Location: East of U.S. Route 42 on the western edge of the Wetherington Golf and Country Club
- Nearest city: Maud, Ohio
- Coordinates: 39°22′1″N 84°23′4″W
- Area: 25 acres (10 ha)
- NRHP reference No.: 75001334
- Added to NRHP: May 29, 1975

The Williamson Mound Archeological District is an archaeological site in the southwestern part of the U.S. state of Ohio. Located north of Maud in Butler County, the mound appears to have been the work of peoples of the Hopewell tradition.

Although a small hole was dug into the top of the Williamson Mound at some point before 1972, the mound remains in premium condition. It sits atop a ridgeline above an intermittent stream in a rural part of increasingly urbanized Butler County.

As one of the best preserved Hopewell mounds in its region, the Williamson Mound is potentially a significant archaeological site. For this reason, it was listed on the National Register of Historic Places in 1975.
