= Beckett–Manrod House =

Historic house in Ohio, United States

- U.S. National Register of Historic Places
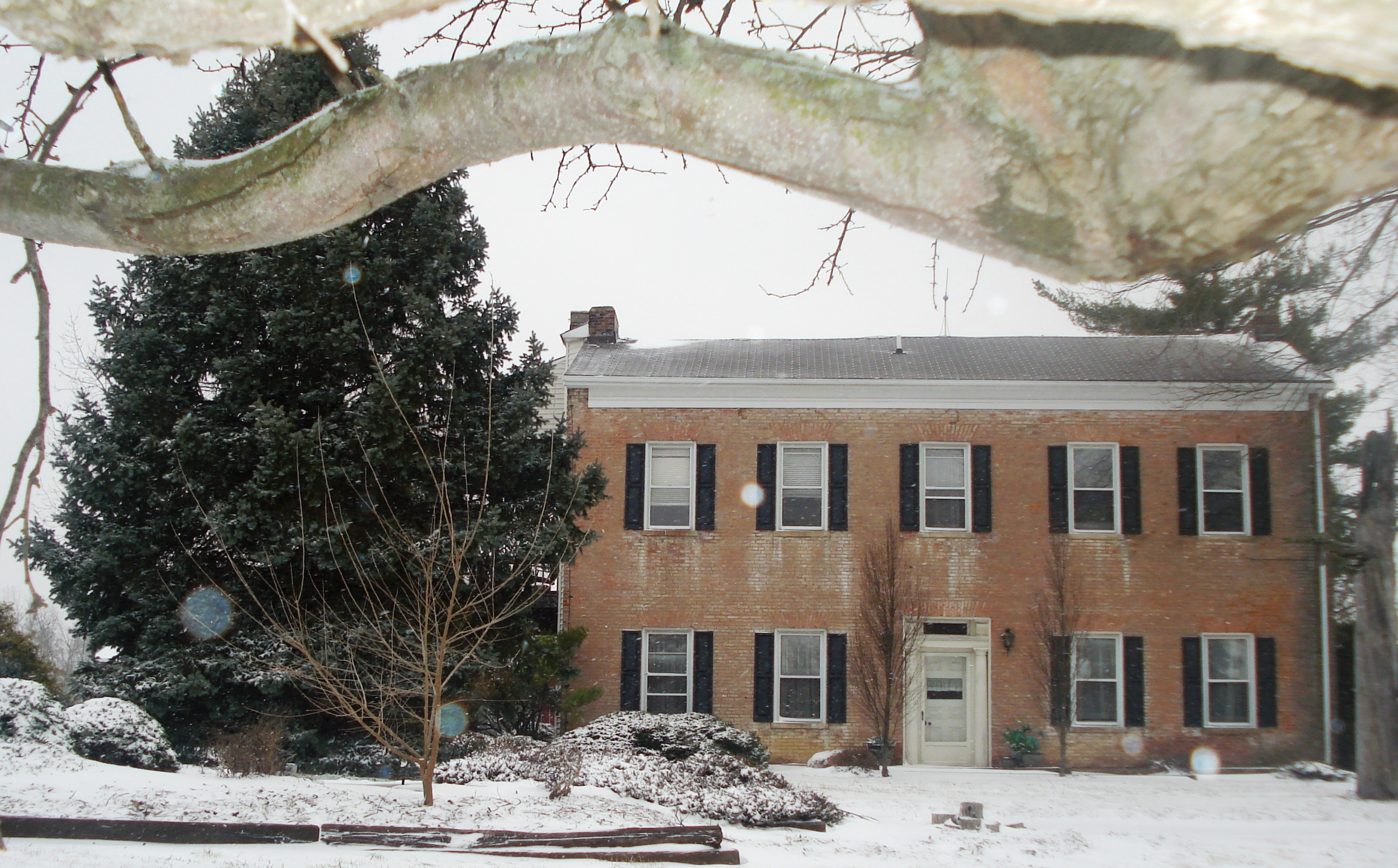

- Location within Ohio Location within the United States
- Location: 2019 Stillwell-Beckett Road
- Nearest city: Hamilton, Ohio
- Coordinates: 39°27′10.96″N 84°38′30.60″W
- Built: 1836
- Architectural style: Federal
- NRHP reference No.: 77001044
- Added to NRHP: 1977-11-11

Beckett–Manrod House is a registered historic building near Hamilton, Ohio, listed in the National Register on 1977-11-11. The house was built by farmer Robert Beckett in 1836. It exemplifies the transition from Federal to Greek Revival architecture in rural Ohio. Jake Manrod acquired the house in 1918.

== Historic uses ==
- Single Dwelling
