= Hogan-Borger Mound Archeological District =

Archaeological site in Ohio, United States

- U.S. National Register of Historic Places
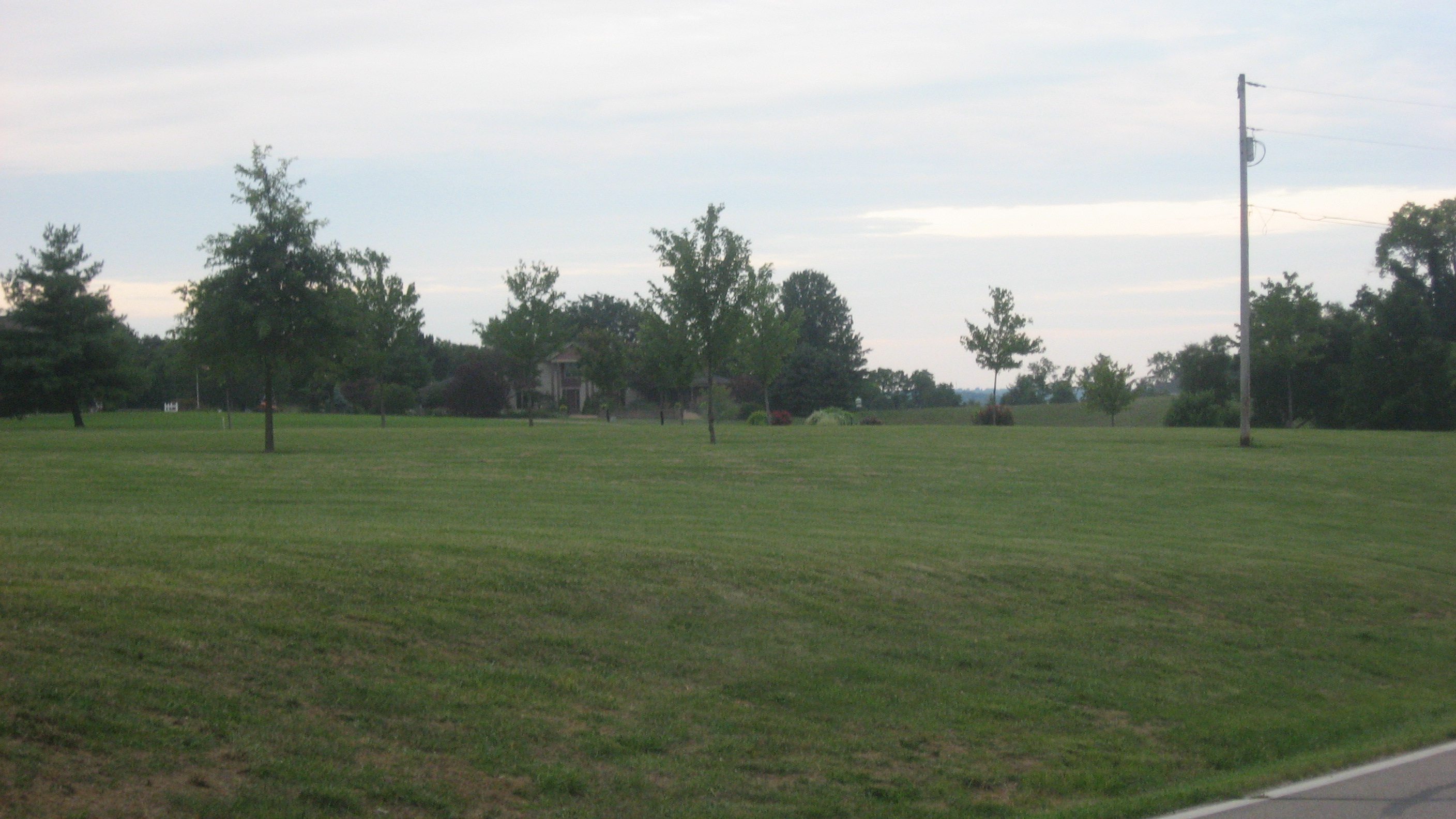
- Overview of the district
- Nearest city: Ross, Ohio
- NRHP reference No.: 75001338
- Added to NRHP: 1975-10-21

Hogan-Borger Mound Archeological District is a registered historic site near Ross, Ohio, listed in the National Register on 1975-10-21.

== Historic uses ==
- Ceremonial Site
- Graves/Burials

== See also ==
- Mound
- Mound builder (people)
- Earthwork (archaeology)
