= Henry P. Deuscher House =

Historic house in Ohio, United States

- U.S. National Register of Historic Places
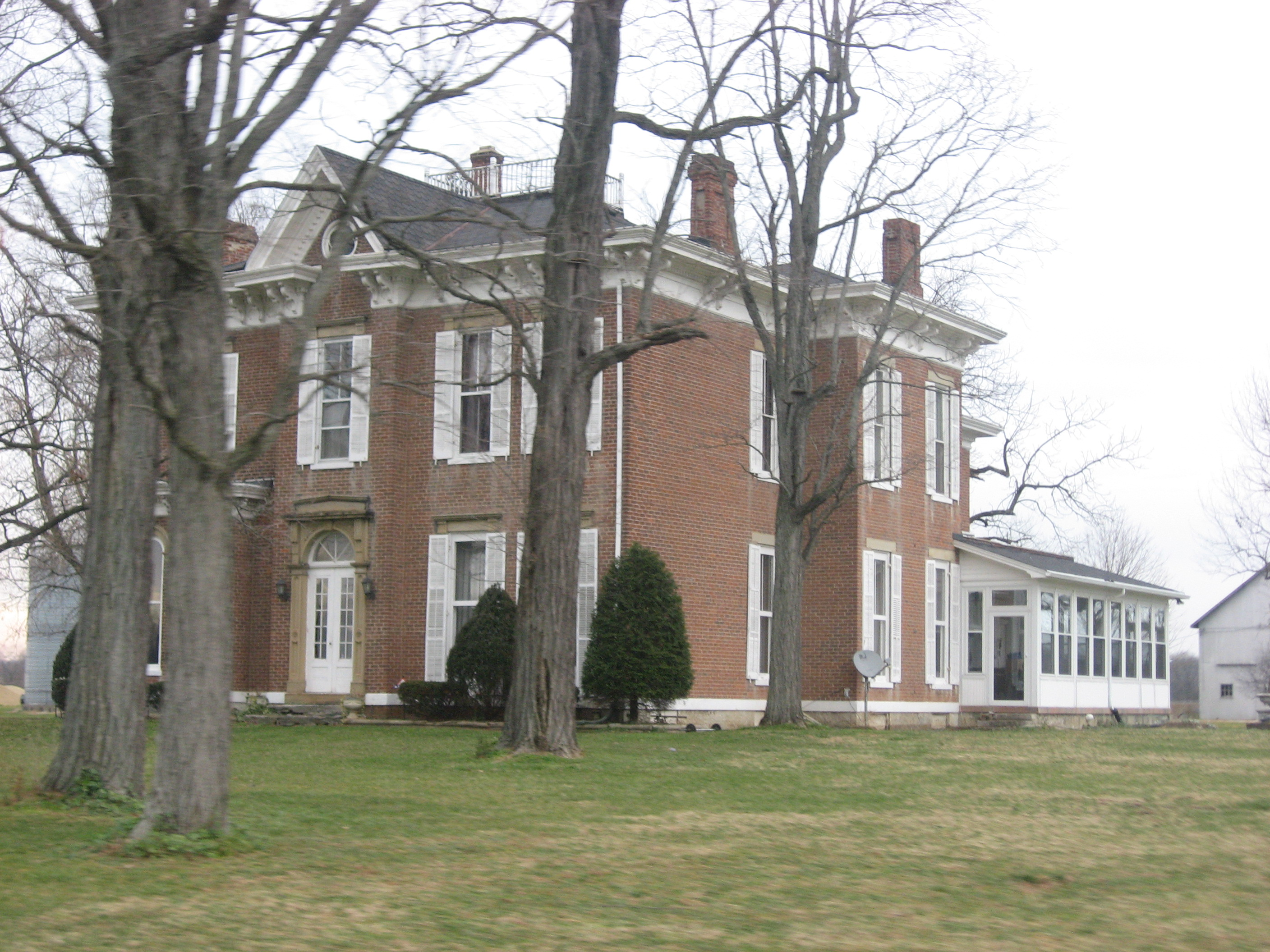
- Roadside view

- Location within Ohio Location within the United States
- Location: 2385 Woodsdale Rd., south of Trenton, Ohio
- Coordinates: 39°27′6″N 84°26′47″W
- Area: 10 acres (4.0 ha)
- Built: 1870
- Architectural style: Italianate
- NRHP reference No.: 84002902
- Added to NRHP: February 9, 1984

The Henry P. Deuscher House is a historic farmhouse in the countryside of the southwestern part of the U.S. state of Ohio. Located near the city of Trenton, it was originally home to one of the area's leading farmers, and it has been named a historic site.

== Henry P. Deuscher ==
Born in the Grand Duchy of Baden in 1830, Henry P. Deuscher emigrated to the United States in early childhood. Upon entering into man's estate, he worked as a butcher in Trenton, but at the age of twenty-seven he bought a farm of 481 acres (195 ha) in Madison Township and soon moved to it. Deuscher's itineracy continued: he soon left the farming life and became a storekeeper in Trenton with a Mr. Wannenwetsch, left the store and returned to his farm, and left the farm to run a distillery. In 1874, he formed H.P. Deuscher & Company to operate a malting business, but the company later changed from brewing to manufacturing farm equipment, and later school desks and other cast iron machinery and parts. Amid all of these other employments, Deuscher found time to form and command a company of the 83rd Ohio Volunteer Infantry during the Civil War.

== Architecture ==
Built of brick with sandstone elements on a stone foundation, the two-story Deuscher House features a central projecting bay containing the entrance and its fanlight; a small gable with oculus sits at the top of the projection. On the left side of the facade, as seen from the road, is a large bay window on the first floor with a single window on the second, while two windows are placed on each floor on the facade's right side. A hip roof covers the house, descending to form a cornice supported by paired brackets. A small widow's walk sits atop the roof, which is ringed by a railing and pierced by four chimneys, and three hood molded windows are placed in the bay. The farmstead includes three other buildings: a barn and shed dating from the farm's early years, and a much newer garage. These elements combine to make the 1870 residence a fine example of the Italianate style of architecture.

== Preservation ==
In 1984, the Deuscher House was listed on the National Register of Historic Places, qualifying both because it was the home of a prominent local resident and because of its historically significant architecture. Numerous other farmhouses in the vicinity of Trenton are listed on the National Register, but the Deuscher House differs greatly from the residue: all others were built by a group of German Amish Mennonites connected with the family of Christian Augspurger, and their plain designs differ greatly from Deuscher's high-style architecture.
