= Woodsdale, Ohio =

Unincorporated community in Ohio, U.S.

Coordinates: 39°26′04″N 84°28′33″W

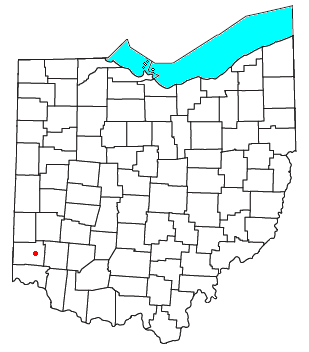
Location of Woodsdale, Ohio

Woodsdale is an unincorporated community in Madison and St. Clair Townships in central Butler County, Ohio, United States, about three miles northeast of Hamilton. As of the 2020 census, Woodsdale had a population of 442. It was established in 1867 by the Beckett Paper Company and was formerly a stop on the Cincinnati, Hamilton, and Dayton Railroad. An electric generation plant of the Cincinnati Gas and Electric Company is located in Woodsdale. Woodsdale is also the location of the Samuel Augspurger House & Farm and The Augspurger Schoolhouse both of which are on the National Register of Historic Places. Woodsdale was also known for the Woodsdale Island Amusement Park.
