= Seven Mile =

Seven Mile may refer to:

== Places ==
- Seven Mile, Arizona, USA
- Seven Mile, Ohio, USA
- Seven Mile Beach (disambiguation)
- Seven Mile Bridge, Florida, USA
- Seven Mile Creek (disambiguation)
- Seven Mile Dam, British Columbia, Canada
- Seven Mile Ford, Virginia, USA
- Seven Mile River (disambiguation)

== Other ==
- The Seven Mile Journey, Danish post-rock band
- 7 Mile (band), American R&B group
  - 7 Mile (album), the group's eponymous album
