= Kumler =

Kumler may refer to:

- Daniel Kumler Flickinger (1824–1911), American Bishop of the Church of the United Brethren in Christ
- Elias Kumler House, registered historic building in Oxford, Ohio
- Henry Kumler, Sr. (1775–1854), bishop of the Church of the United Brethren in Christ in the USA
- Kumler, Illinois, ghost town in West Township, McLean County, Illinois, USA
- Rike Kumler Co., former American department store in Dayton, Ohio
