= Kinishba Ruins =

Archaeological site in Arizona, United States

- U.S. National Register of Historic Places
- U.S. National Historic Landmark District
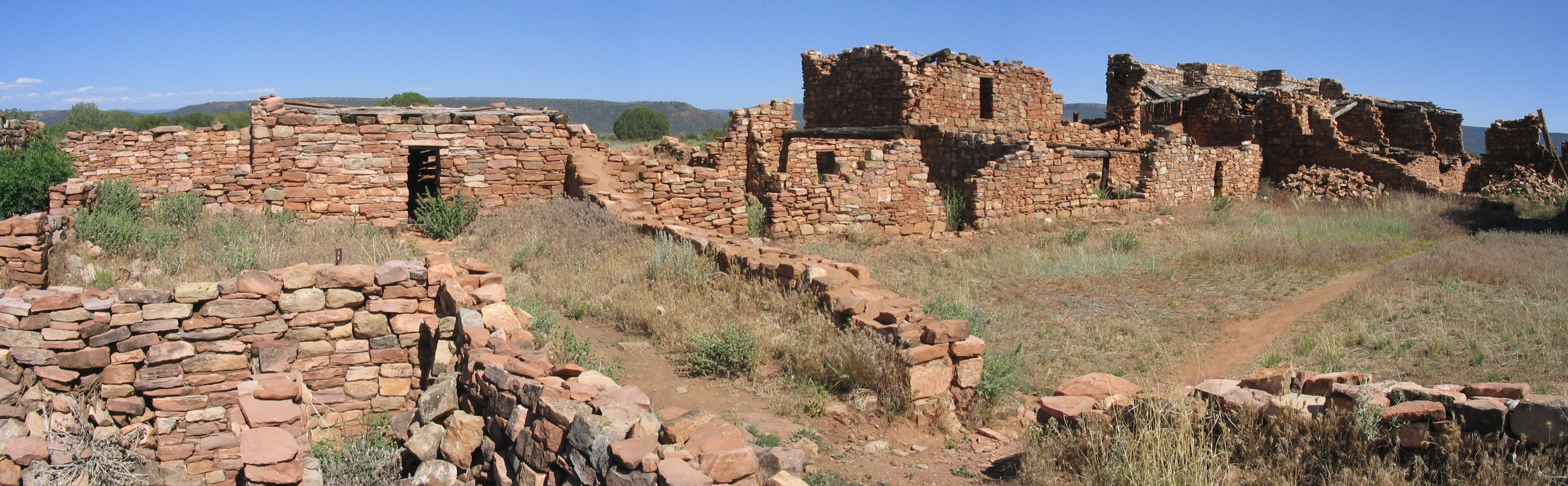
- Kinishba Ruins

- Location within Arizona Location within the United States
- Location: Gila County, Arizona, USA
- Nearest city: Canyon Day, Arizona
- Coordinates: 33°48′53″N 110°03′16″W
- Architect: Vernacular
- Architectural style: Ancestral Pueblo
- NRHP reference No.: 66000180

Significant dates
- Added to NRHP: October 15, 1966
- Designated NHLD: July 19, 1964

Kinishba Ruins is a 600-room Mogollon great house archaeological site in eastern Arizona and is administered by the White Mountain Apache Tribe. It is located on the present-day Fort Apache Indian Reservation, near the Apache community of Canyon Day. As it demonstrates a combination of both Mogollon and Ancestral Puebloan cultural traits, archaeologists consider it part of the historical lineage of both the Hopi and Zuni cultures. It is designated as a National Historic Landmark.

Kinishba's elevation is about 5,000 feet (1,500 m). It lies above a pine-fringed alluvial valley, west of Fort Apache, near the White Mountain Apache Tribal community of Canyon Day. Long known to the Apache people of the region and alleged to have been visited by Conquistadors, the site was first written about in English in 1892, when pioneering archaeologist Adolph Bandelier described the ruins. In 1964, the NPS designated the site as a National Historic Landmark. It had long been abandoned and fallen into disrepair. The ruins received limited cleanup and restoration in 2005–2007.

Scholars believe that Kinishba may have been the pueblo Chiciticale referred to in narratives of the 1540–41 Spanish expedition led by Francisco Vásquez de Coronado.

== Etymology ==
From 1931 to 1940, the archaeologist Dr. Byron Cummings, Director of the Arizona State Museum (and head of the Department of Archeology at the University of Arizona), led a team of archaeology students and local Apache field assistants over several seasons to excavate and restore Kinishba. He named the site after the Apache-language words kin lishba, which he wrote was the local Apache name for the ruins, meaning "brown house."

== Description ==
=== Kinishba ===
A large Kinishba bowl held by Prof. Byron Cummings, who excavated the ruins in the 1930s. Photo shows other pottery collected by Cummings at Kinishba or nearby. Circa 1940s photo by Arizona State Museum.

Kinishba is about 5,000 feet (1,500 m) above sea level, south of the Mogollon Rim and north of the Salt River. It is at the eastern foot of Tsé Sizin ("Rock Standing Up" or Sawtooth Mountain), on White Mountain Apache trust lands associated with the Fort Apache Indian Reservation. The ruins are located in a valley that slopes to the right bank of the White River. The site is easily accessible in comparison to the other 20 or so large (150 or more rooms) Ancestral Pueblo village ruins in the Fort Apache area. Estimates suggest the ruins were built and occupied from the 12th to 14th centuries as part of the ancient population boom within the Mogollon Rim region and beyond. Centralized in the lush mountains of the Mt. Baldy watershed, the area has been linked to both Mogollon and Anasazi cultures. They were considered part of the western Pueblo complex.

The Kinishba pueblo is composed of nine major building mounds, the remains of masonry room blocks, some of which were originally three stories tall. There were two large apartment blocks, and several smaller buildings, with two communal courtyards. At its peak, Kinishba may have housed up to 1,000 to 1,500 people. The masonry walls are unique for their double-walled construction: one side is faced and the other made of rubble. The rooms averaged 14 by 12 feet (4.3 by 3.7 m), with a firepit in the center. Scholars believe that most families occupied two rooms, one for living quarters and one for storage.

In the smaller courtyard was a kiva, a room built underground for religious ceremonies. The larger courtyard revealed evidence of three ceremonial stages. It is 63 by 51 feet (19 by 16 m). In the first stage, of the late 12th century or early 13th century, five underground rooms, each the size of the kiva, were built; they had earthen rather than masonry walls. About the middle of the 13th century, these rooms were filled in. Juniper posts were set into the ground to support beams and a roof, making a large, above-ground room of the courtyard. Later the roof burned, and researchers found no evidence that it was replaced. Ceremonies were moved to other rooms of the pueblo.

=== Construction and habitation in the Fort Apache region ===
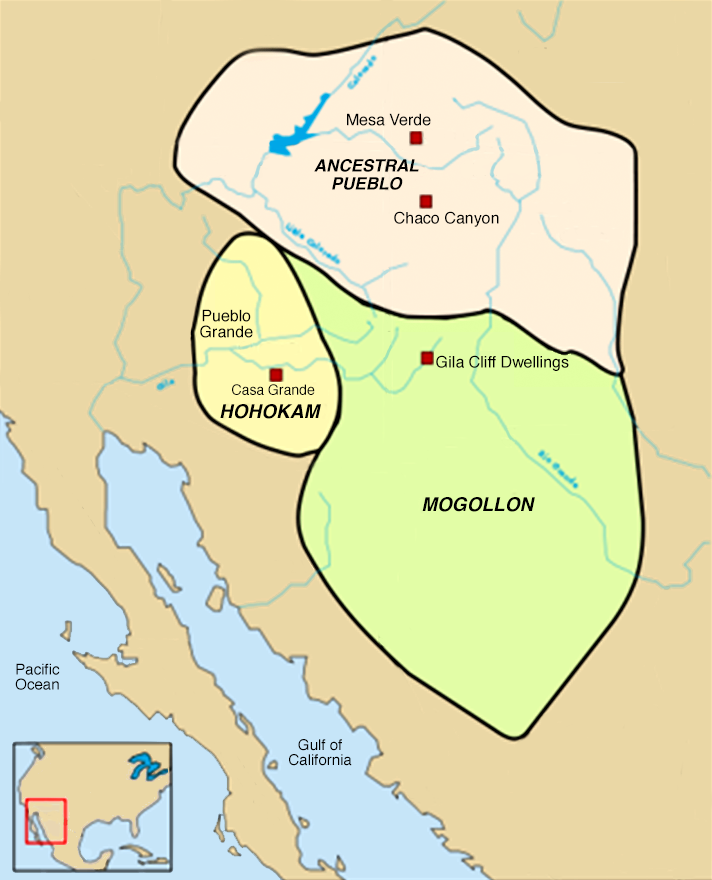
Mogollon range of influence at the time of Kinishba habitation

The largest 13th- and 14th-century ruins along the Mogollon Rim all share architectural elements, ceramic assemblages, and similar locational characteristics. They are proximate to expanses of land suitable for dry maize farming, and they have ready access to domestic water, tabular sandstone or limestone, and ponderosa pine.

All of these large villages were built up from apartment-style room blocks, laid out to define communal courtyards or plazas.

The resident people cultivated corn, beans and gourds nearby, which were raised together to conserve moisture. They may have raised cotton as well, and gathered fruits, berries, nuts and other foods locally. The White Mountains region served as plentiful resource that allowed for hunting and gathering of food. The women processed the meat for food, and the skin, sinew and bones for clothing, tools, and other needs.

Kinishba and her sister villages were abandoned by the Mogollon people in the late 14th or early 15th century for unknown reasons. It may have been related to a water source drying up. The area saw little human interaction until the arrival of the nomadic culture of the Apache from the western Great Plains. The ruins were not used by the Apache.

== Archeological excavation ==
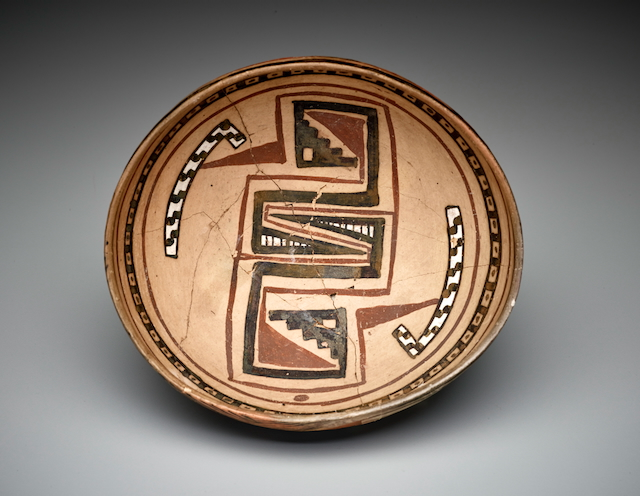
Kinishba polychrome bowl. Culture: Ancestral Pueblo. Date: 1300–1450. Dallas Museum of Art

Over the years, the site was pulled apart by pot hunters and soldiers from Fort Apache seeking souvenirs. In 1892 Adolph Bandelier, a pioneering archaeologist, was the first European to write about the site, and other archeologists visited it.

From 1931 into the 1940s, Byron Cummings of the University of Arizona led a team of students and a varying workforce of 10 to 27 White Mountain Apache to excavate and restore the site. Cummings named the site, derived from the Apache words kįh łibáá, which he transcribed as "kin lishba," meaning "brown house".

He created a university field school at the camp of the site, which had seasons from 1931 to 1939. He used a variety of funding means, including his broad network of supporters and the Civilian Conservation Corps and Bureau of Indian Affairs (which administered the Fort Apache Agency), to pay for workers and materials. Chester Holden, David Kane, and Turner Thompson were Apache men who spent at least five seasons at the site and became strongly attached to the preservation project.

In addition, the teams built a small museum and tourist site in 1939 to hold artifacts and interpret the site. Built during the Great Depression, the museum was intended also as a place for the Apache to sell their contemporary arts and crafts, and to provide continuing employment for tribal members. Cummings was a scholar-entrepreneur, who "combined archaeological research and training; intertribal and interagency collaboration; historic preservation; and museum, community, and tourism enterprise development" in the first project of its kind in Arizona." With his teams, Cummings "excavated at least 220 rooms", and "rebuilt about 140". He enhanced what today is called a heritage tourism destination.

Cummings believed that the site was so important that it should be designated by the Department of the Interior as a National Monument and added to properties managed by the National Park Service. The agency gave preference to more accessible sites, given the needs of the Great Depression quickly followed by World War II. Cummings did not succeed in having the NPS take over the site.

In 1956 the Department of the Interior published a pamphlet on the site, referring to the "Kinishba Ruins and Museum". The site was declared a National Historic Landmark in 1964 by the Department of the Interior and added to the National Register of Historic Places.

Since then, the ruins have not been maintained and have deteriorated, as did the museum. A partial restoration was done in 2005–2007 to stabilize much of the site. The complex is administered by the White Mountain Apache Tribe and the Fort Apache Heritage Foundation as a "satellite" element of the Fort Apache Historic Park. The White Mountain Apache require visitors to obtain a permit to visit the Kinishba Ruins site.

The White Mountain Apache have built their own museum at the Fort Apache Historic Park, based on their traditional style of a gowa, or home. It is called Nohwike' Bágowa (House of Our Footprints), or the White Mountain Apache Culture Center and Museum. The park includes a 288-acre (117 ha) National Historic District, with 27 buildings dating from the US Army's use of the fort during the Apache Wars. The reservation has standing structures ranging in age from ancient to contemporary times. The tribe has provided explanations of the history of the Mogollon Rim Pueblo, as well as the historic and contemporary White Mountain Apache.

== See also ==
- Ancestral Puebloans
- Forty Houses, Chihuahua
- Gila Cliff Dwellings National Monument
- Hohokam
- Mogollon culture
- Paquimé, Chihuahua
- Petrified Forest National Park
- Southwestern archaeology
