= Seven Mile Creek =

Seven Mile Creek or Sevenmile Creek is a place name. It may refer to

== Communities ==
- Seven Mile Creek, Wisconsin, a town in Juneau County
- Lamartine, Wisconsin, formerly called Seven Mile Creek or Seven-Mile-Creek

== Streams ==
- Sevenmile Creek (Ohio), in Preble County and Butler counties
- Sevenmile Creek (South Dakota)
- Sevenmile Creek (Tennessee), a tributary of Mill Creek
- Sevenmile Creek (Wisconsin River tributary), a stream in Wisconsin
