= Battle of Fort Apache =

Part of the Apache Wars

- Part of Apache Wars, Geronimo's War
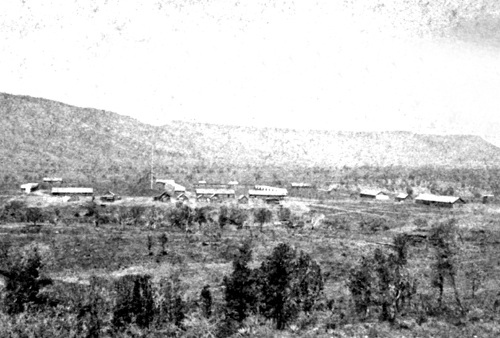
- Fort Apache, 1873
Date	September 1, 1881
Location	Fort Apache, Fort Apache Indian Reservation, Arizona Territory 33.791°N 109.989°W
Result	United States victory

Belligerents
United States	Apache

Commanders and leaders
(United States) Eugene Asa Carr	Unknown

Strength
~100 cavalry, native scouts, 1 fort	~100 warriors

Casualties and losses
3 wounded	Unknown

The Battle of Fort Apache was an engagement of the Apache Wars between the cavalry garrison of Fort Apache and dozens of mounted White Mountain Apache warriors. The battle occurred in eastern Arizona Territory on September 1, 1881.

== Battle ==
The native attack on Fort Apache, which was commanded by Colonel Eugene Asa Carr, was a counter-attack in reprisal for the Battle of Cibecue Creek, in which medicine man Nochaydelklinne was killed. Some Arizona historians would consider the attack on Fort Apache to be a continuation of the Cibecue Creek engagement, but the two battles occurred about 40 miles from each other on opposite sides of the Fort Apache Reservation and occurred two days apart. The Apache army repeatedly attacked the fort from a long range with their rifles near Whiteriver, Arizona, firing volleys and scoring some hits.

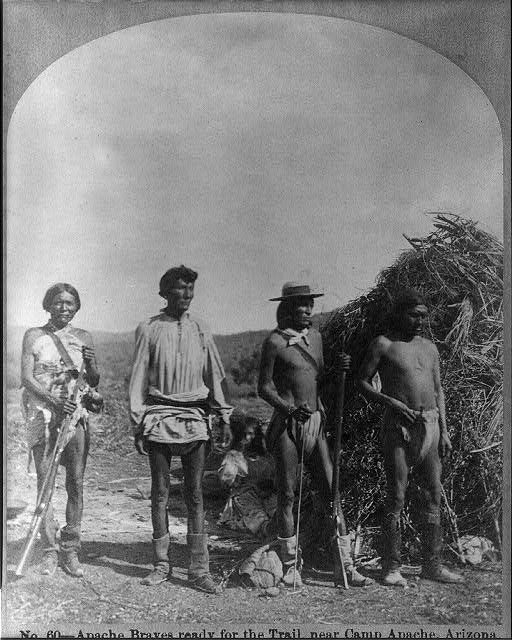
Apaches near Fort Apache in 1873

The U.S. cavalry and native allies fought back, but the Apache remained at the end of their rifle range during the entire fight. The battle lasted until sunset after several Apache attacks had been repulsed by counter fire. Two days later, reinforcements from Fort Thomas on the San Carlos Indian Reservation arrived, but by this time, the Apaches had already retreated into hiding. Only three American soldiers were wounded and Apache casualties are unknown.

== Aftermath ==
As result of Nochaydelklinne's death and the siege of the fort, other Apache groups decided to abandon their recently established reservations and join Geronimo and other leaders for war, or to escape to northern Mexico. The two separate engagements at Cibecue Creek and Fort Apache helped ignite another Apache war in Arizona Territory, which would end with the surrender of Geronimo at Skeleton Canyon five years later in 1886.

The site was listed in the 1998 World Monuments Watch by the World Monuments Fund. The fund subsequently provided financial assistance for the development of master plan for the fort's historic building through financial-services company American Express.

== See also ==
- American Indian Wars
