= Daniel Kumler Flickinger =

American bishop of the United Brethren (1824–1911)

Daniel Kumler Flickinger (25 May 1824 – 29 August 1911) was an American bishop of the Church of the United Brethren in Christ, elected in 1885. He was the twenty-fifth Bishop of this Christian denomination, and the first elected to the office of Missionary Bishop.

== Family ==
Bishop Flickinger was born 25 May 1824 near the village of Seven Mile, Butler County, Ohio, the sixth of the fourteen children born to Jacob and Hannah (Kumler) Flickinger. Jacob's ancestors were Swiss Mennonites; Hannah was the daughter of Henry Kumler Sr, a Bishop and influential leader in the early years of the Church of the United Brethren in Christ. Henry's son Henry Kumler Jr likewise was elected Bishop. Bishop Flickinger was therefore a grandson and a nephew of U.B. Bishops. His mother, Hannah, was the daughter, sister and mother of U.B. Bishops.

Flickinger's parents were married in Franklin County, Pennsylvania, there establishing their first home. In 1818 they moved to Ohio. The next year Hannah's parents followed, there too establishing their home in Butler County. Jacob became a prosperous farmer and a zealous local preacher in the Miami Annual Conference of the U.B. Church. As was true of many of the pioneers of that day, he believed in hard work and rigid economy. He was also known for his deep-seated prejudice against higher education, also not unusual in that day.

The Flickinger home was used as a location for services, lodging, and board for traveling preachers while they remained in the community.

For example, it is said that on one occasion a preacher arrived with his clothes tied in a cotton cloth. It was evident he needed a pair of saddle bags, having no money with which to purchase them, however. His host told him to stop at a certain saddle shop, buy the saddle bags, and have them charged to him. The preacher, doing as instructed, continued to use those same bags for nearly a half century!

== Early life ==
Flickinger's youth was marked by experiences common to the pioneer children of his day. Much work and little time for play was the lot of most every one of them. Daniel took advantage of every opportunity which the rural school of his community offered.

His deep religious interest dated back to when he was eight years old. Having heard a relative tell his father that many children were dying in a community about four miles (6 km) from their home, the boy became fearful that he would die and that he would certainly go to perdition. This morbid condition continued throughout the years of his boyhood. In November 1839 Daniel became a member of the U.B. Church. He made it a rule thereafter to pray four times a day and to take part in public services whenever possible.

Flickinger married Miss Mary Litner 25 February 1847. The newlyweds established themselves on a good farm near the parental home. All seemed to go well until about a year and one half later, when his wife fell victim to an affliction from which she never recovered. In the autumn of 1848 she and their child went to live with her mother, while Flickinger taught school. In the spring of 1849 he sold his stock and rented his farm. At that time he owned 317 acres (1.28 km^{2}) of fine farming land in Butler County in the Miami Valley of Ohio. If his wife's health had not broken, he probably would have become known as a prosperous and progressive farmer. But the course of his life was soon to take a very different turn.

== Early ministry ==
Flickinger continued reading and studying. He taught another school term the winter of 1849-50. Meanwhile, his Pastor, the Rev. John Coons, who had also served as Bishop for one quadrennium, asked the local congregation to recommend Daniel Flickinger for quarterly conference License to Preach. This was done without his knowledge, and the license was granted April 1849. In the next year and a half the young minister tried to preach four or five times. He received his Annual Conference License to Preach at the Conference session of October 1850, signed by Bishop J.J. Glossbrenner. From there Rev. Flickinger was sent as the Junior Preacher (with the Rev. R. Norris) to the Mt. Pleasant Circuit, including nine preaching places all located near the city of Cincinnati, Ohio.

Determined to enter college and take a full course of study, Rev. Flickinger purchased a home in Oxford, Ohio, planning to enter Miami University. This was in the autumn of 1851. However, in September he was called away from the conference session to find his sick wife's condition so grave that she died a few days later, leaving him with two children (one about two and one-half years old and the other less than a week). This changed his plans entirely and he never returned to the university. Rev. Flickinger, instead, took appointment to the Lewisburg Circuit consisting of six preaching places, serving there 1851-52. During this year he raised a far larger sum for missions than had ever been raised on that field before.

Being in poor health himself, Rev. Flickinger decided not to accept a pastoral appointment in 1852. Instead, he accompanied Bishop Glossbrenner on his rounds to conference sessions. This took him to the Indiana, Wabash, Iowa, and Illinois Annual Conferences. Rev. Flickinger gave to the needy preachers he met along the way all the money he had not necessary for his own expenses, plus his watch besides. He then spent part of the following winter in the Glossbrenner home in Virginia. While there he became married to the Bishop's daughter, Miss Catherine Glossbrenner, 9 January 1853. Then, during the latter part of that conference year, Rev. Flickinger served as a colporteur for the American Tract Society, and as a City Missionary in Cincinnati, Ohio.

== Ordained ministry ==
At the 1853 autumn session of the Miami Conference, Flickinger was ordained by Bishop David Edwards. He was appointed as Junior Preacher (with William R. Rhinehart) on the circuit consisting of Dayton, Miami Chapel, and Beavertown. In his memoirs, Bishop Flickinger provided this remembrance of the U.B. Church in Dayton at that time (soon to be the headquarters city of the Church of the United Brethren in Christ):

"Our church was new then, more noisy than any other in the city, and that brought crowds of people."

In August 1854, Catherine Glossbrenner Flickinger died, leaving her husband a widower the second time. Despite his grief, however, he continued his work. The Miami Conference session of 1854 divided the Dayton Circuit, and Flickinger was appointed to the city church.

== Missionary service ==
In autumn 1854, Rev. Flickinger offered to join W.J. Shuey and D.C. Kumler as the first missionaries of the Church of the United Brethren in Christ to go to Africa, "provided no better person could be secured." At first his offer was rejected on the grounds of his poor health. But in December the call came to him. According to his own account, the message reached him at ten o'clock in the morning, his acceptance was given at two o'clock, and by six o'clock that same evening he was on his way to New York City to make plans for sailing.

He returned to Dayton, resigned his pastorate on Christmas Day, and went back to New York on 4 January to board a vessel en route to Sierra Leone. After some delay the three missionaries sailed 23 January 1855, reaching Freetown 26 February. They spent the first few months surveying the field. On 30 June his two companions returned to the U.S., leaving Flickinger alone. He spent his time seeking a suitable location for the mission of his Church.

During these months Rev. Flickinger made his home with the Mendi mission of the Congregational Church. Six of their missionaries had arrived on the same boat with Flickinger. One of these six, Miss Susanna Woolsey of Willoughby, Ohio, a teacher in the Mendi mission, became the wife of Daniel Flickinger 30 October 1855.

After additional surveying, as well as a period of critical illness, the Flickingers sailed for the U.S. 31 March 1856, arriving in New York City 11 May. Rev. Flickinger then attended the meeting of the Board of Missions of the U.B. Church in Mt. Pleasant, Pennsylvania early in June. There he gave a full report of the conditions he found in Sierra Leone during the fourteen months he spent there.

== Reenters pastoral ministry ==
That summer Rev. Flickinger traveled about to U.B. churches, telling about Africa and soliciting funds for the promotion of the mission work. When his Annual Conference met in September 1856, he was appointed Pastor of a mission church in Piqua, Ohio. He entered upon his work with characteristic zeal, in six weeks seeing the church building repaired and the work moving forward with great promise. Nevertheless, when the Board of Missions called, Rev. Flickinger again sailed for Africa early in December, arriving January 1857.

== Return to missionary work ==
Daniel took with him two new missionaries. He introduced them to the field, then left them to carry forward the work, while Flickinger returned to the U.S. in time to again attend the meeting of the Board of Missions (and the General Conference of the U.B. Church) held in Cincinnati, May 1857. He was elected Secretary of Missionary Work for his denomination. After serving only a few months, however, he was stricken by illness, forcing his resignation. J.C. Bright was named to succeed him. But soon Bright found himself unable to carry this responsibility. Upon his resignation, Flickinger was re-elected in 1858, and continued in this work until elected Missionary Bishop of the U.B. Church in 1885.

== Missionary Secretary ==
During the twenty-eight years Daniel Flickinger served as Secretary, he made six trips to Africa to organize, counsel and encouraged the missionaries there. Concerning a trip during the Winter of 1861-62, Daniel wrote:

I paid the entire expense of that trip to Africa and back on sail vessels, which, however, was a small matter in comparison to the discomfort and sufferings which I endured. On my way out, a fearful gale filled my cabin with water, and on my way home, an equally severe storm was encountered. Then the ship was short of provisions on the home voyage. For two weeks the only food we had was wormy bread, "sow belly," as the sailors called it, and black coffee. The captain and crew were very profane, and their only passenger was much neglected.

He had a personal conference with President Abraham Lincoln once, concerning establishing a school in Vicksburg, Mississippi for former slaves. The school was started, at one time employing as many as nine teachers. But after the end of the American Civil War the school was discontinued. Flickinger also was instrumental in establishing a mission in Germany, visiting it eight times.

Rev. Flickinger also was called upon to solicit funds for other departments and interests of his denomination from time to time. A conspicuous example of his success was the endowment of the Flickinger Chair in Otterbein University (now College).

== Otterbein University ==
In 1880, the university awarded Flickinger an honorary degree Doctor of Divinity. He subsequently served the college for many years as a trustee. Although his primary focus was missionary work, he also contributed financially and through his time and effort to various activities of the Church, including the university.

== Literary ministry ==
Flickinger sought a means of disseminating information concerning missions to the whole Church. He therefore wrote articles for the denominational periodicals, published books, and introduced a missions magazine in 1865, the Missionary Visitor. He continued as Editor for twenty years, until his election to the episcopacy.

His first book was published in 1857, titled Off-Hand Sketches of Men and Things in Western Africa. Several more books followed, some written in collaboration with others. Most had missions as their focus. In his book titled Our Missionary Work he described Africa as having over a hundred million people that worshipped idols and Satan.

== Episcopal ministry ==
The 1885 General Conference of the Church of the United Brethren in Christ convened in May in Fostoria, Ohio. Sentiment at the conference favored the establishment of the office of Missionary Bishop. Its focus would be the supervision of U.B. missions in Africa and Germany, as well as solicitation of funds in the Church in the U.S.A. The General Conference adopted this plan, and Daniel Kumler Flickinger was elected on the first ballot the first Missionary Bishop of the United Brethren Church.

Bishop Flickinger gave himself and his own personal means to the furtherance of his work during the following quadrennium. He traveled to Africa three times, and gave much time to the mission in Germany, as well. Indeed, he had little opportunity to take part in the controversy which was brewing in the U.B. Church at home.

== Post-episcopacy ==
The 1889 General Conference of the Church of the United Brethren in Christ, meeting in York, Pennsylvania in May, discontinued the Missionary Bishopric. This left a very busy and earnest man without regular assignment. Indeed, writing of his experiences during the next few years, Daniel said:

After the division of the Church, in 1889, owing to certain things which had occurred, I did not feel at home in the Church, and hence spent most of these three years preaching for Congregationalists, though I never withdrew from our Church. Thinking that I would get over that feeling, I did commence my forty-first year by taking charge of a United Brethren mission station in my own conference.

== United Brethren in Christ (Old Constitution) ==
In December 1895 Rev. Flickinger joined the Scioto Annual Conference of the "break-away" segment of the Church of the United Brethren in Christ (that one, led by Bishop Wright, which continued by means of the former denominational Constitution). Daniel found there an opportunity to make his twelfth trip to Africa, in 1896. On 1 July 1897 he was appointed to the office of Secretary of the Domestic, Frontier, and Foreign Missionary Society of this denomination. By virtue of this office, he also became Editor of the first eight pages of the Missionary Monthly magazine.

Nevertheless, disappointed in some conditions which he found in this denomination, on 1 June 1905 he severed his connection with the Board of Missions. He joined the First U.B. Church in Indianapolis, Indiana in December. Then in August 1906 he was accepted again into the Ministerial membership of the Miami Conference, where he had worked in his earlier years.

== Bishop Flickinger's children ==
Flickinger had ten children, five of whom survived into adulthood. His oldest son, Samuel Jacob Flickinger, was widely known as the long-time Editor of the Ohio State Journal, published in Columbus, Ohio. Another son, Dr. Elmer Ellsworth Flickinger, practiced medicine six years and then went into business in Indianapolis, where he was also known as one of the leading laymen of the U.B. Church. The Bishop's youngest son died when only nine years old. He had three other sons and two daughters.

The chief of Imperi, Daniel Flickinger Wilberforce (born 1856), was named after Flickinger.

== Later years, death and funeral ==
Flickinger spent most of his later years in the homes of his children. When past eighty-seven years of age, he attended the session of the Miami Annual Conference, 23–28 August 1911 in Dayton, Ohio. Bishop Flickinger died suddenly on 29 August 1911 in Columbus, Ohio.

His funeral was held in the U.B. Church in Hamilton, Ohio. Dr. H.H. Fout (later Bishop) gave the Memorial Address. Dr. W.J. Shuey, who had gone to Africa with Flickinger in 1855, spoke intimately of their associations throughout the years. Interment was in the cemetery at Oxford, Ohio.

In an editorial statement in the Religious Telescope (a U.B. denominational periodical), Dr. J.M. Phillippi wrote,

A great life has closed - great in its comprehensive grasp of affairs, great in its attention to details, great in the maintenance of its faith and good-will to the close.

== Selected writings ==
- Off-Hand Sketches of Men and Things in Western Africa, 1857.
- Discourses on Doctrinal and Practical Subjects (with Dr. W.J. Shuey), 1859.
- The Church's Marching Orders, 1979.
- Ethiopia; or Twenty-six Years of Missionary Life in Western Africa, 1882.
- History of the Origin, Development and Condition of Missions Among the Sherbro and Mendi Tribes in Western Africa (with William McKee), 1885.
- Our Missionary Work from 1853-1889, 1889.
- Fifty-five Years in the Gospel Ministry (autobiography), 1907.

== See also ==
- List of bishops of the United Methodist Church
