= Dixon Branch (Ohio) =

Stream in Preble County, Ohio, U.S.

Coordinates: 39°41′47″N 84°45′21″W

Dixon Branch is a stream in Preble County, Ohio. The 2.7-mile (4.3 km) stream is a tributary of Four Mile Creek.

Dixon Branch bears the name of an early settler.

== See also ==
- List of rivers of Ohio
