= Roberts Covered Bridge =

- U.S. National Register of Historic Places
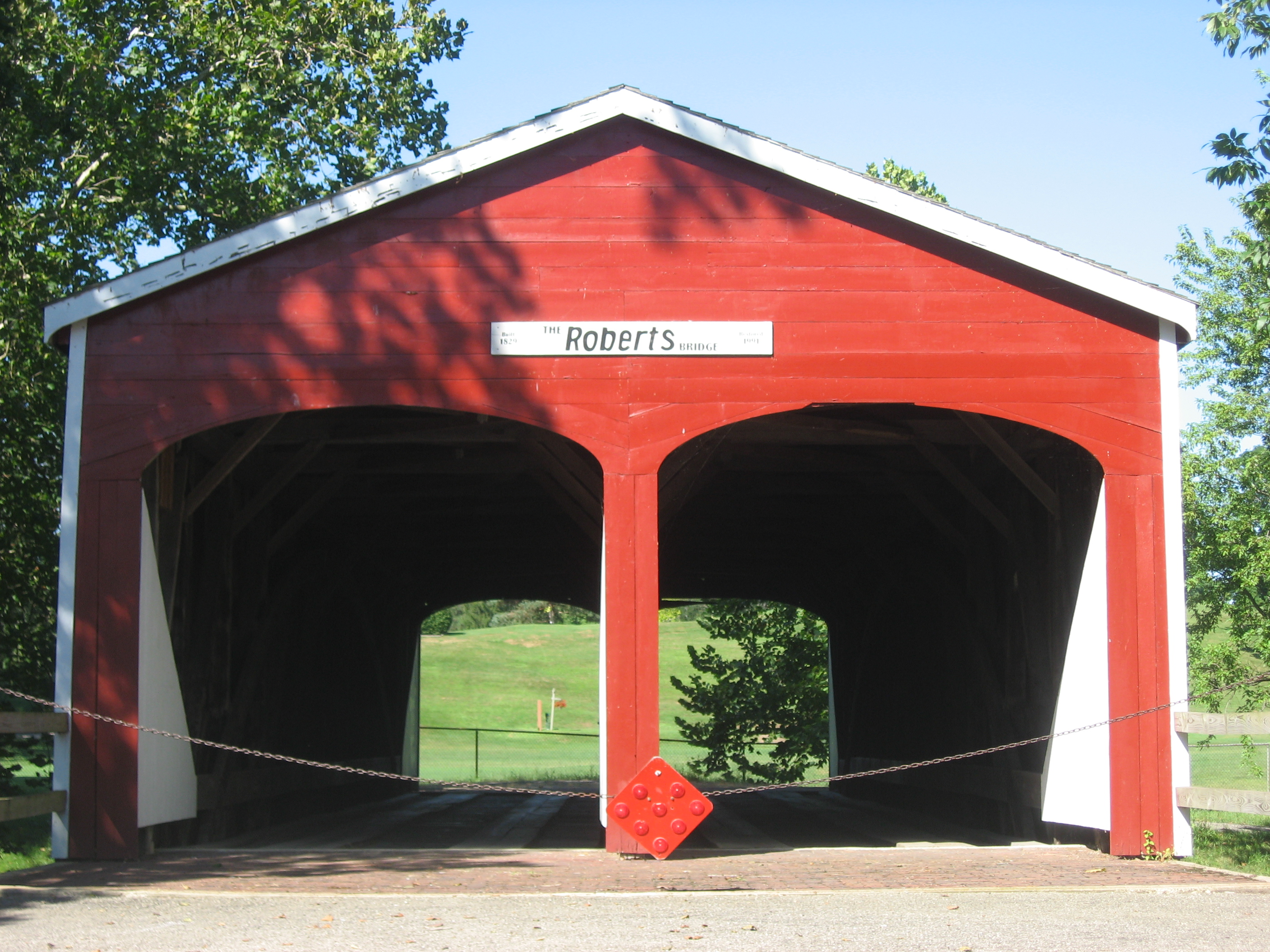
- Eastern end
- Nearest city: Eaton, Ohio
- Area: less than one acre
- Built: 1829
- Built by: Roberts, Orlistus; Campbell, Joseph
- Architectural style: Burr Arch & Truss
- NRHP reference No.: 71000651
- Added to NRHP: September 3, 1971

The Roberts Covered Bridge is a Burr Truss covered bridge in Preble County, Ohio near Eaton. It was built in 1829, and was listed on the National Register of Historic Places in 1971.

The bridge was built in 1829 by (and named for) Orlistus Roberts, originally crossing Sevenmile Creek about 2.5 miles (4.0 km) south of Eaton at 39°42′41″N 84°37′15″W. It was restored in 1962, and further repairs were made in 1974. After being vandalized and heavily damaged by a fire in 1986, it was restored and moved to a city park in Eaton in 1990, still crossing Sevenmile Creek at 39.740437°N 84.638759°W.

It is claimed to be the oldest covered bridge in Ohio, the second oldest covered bridge in the United States, and the oldest of the six remaining "double-barreled" covered bridges in the United States. Its current location is about 150 feet (46 m) north of the St. Clair Street Bridge, also listed on the National Register of Historic Places. It is closed to traffic.
