= Canyon Day, Arizona =

Census-designatged place in Gila County, Arizona, United States

- Census-designated place
- Location in Gila County and the state of Arizona

- Location in the United States
- Coordinates: 33°47′16″N 110°1′25″W
- Country: United States
- State: Arizona
- County: Gila

Area
  - Total: 5.25 sq mi (13.61 km^{2})
  - Land: 5.20 sq mi (13.46 km^{2})
  - Water: 0.058 sq mi (0.15 km^{2})
- Elevation: 5,000 ft (1,524 m)

Population (2020)
  - Total: 1,205
  - Density: 231.9/sq mi (89.54/km^{2})
- Time zone: UTC-7 (MST (no DST))
- ZIP code: 85542
- Area code: 928
- FIPS code: 04-10040
- GNIS feature ID: 0002435

Canyon Day (Western Apache: Yangongai) is a census-designated place (CDP) in Gila County, Arizona, United States, on the Fort Apache Indian Reservation. The population was 1,209 at the 2010 census.

== Geography ==
Canyon Day is located in easternmost Gila County at 33°47′16″N 110°1′25″W (33.787774, -110.023655). It is bordered to the east by Fort Apache in Navajo County. Arizona State Route 73 passes through Canyon Day, leading northeast 24 miles (39 km) to Hondah or Indian Pine and northwest 23 miles (37 km) to U.S. Route 60 near Carrizo.

According to the United States Census Bureau, the CDP has a total area of 5.08 square miles (13.16 km^{2}), of which 5.02 square miles (13.01 km^{2}) is land and 0.058 square miles (0.15 km^{2}), or 1.2%, is water. The White River, a west-flowing tributary of the Salt River, forms the southern edge of the Canyon Day CDP.

== Demographics ==
Historical population
Census	Pop.	Note	%±
2020	1,205		—
U.S. Decennial Census

=== 2020 census ===
As of the 2020 census, Canyon Day had a population of 1,205. The median age was 30.4 years. 33.9% of residents were under the age of 18 and 8.7% of residents were 65 years of age or older. For every 100 females there were 99.5 males, and for every 100 females age 18 and over there were 107.0 males age 18 and over.

0.0% of residents lived in urban areas, while 100.0% lived in rural areas.

There were 305 households in Canyon Day, of which 44.3% had children under the age of 18 living in them. Of all households, 30.8% were married-couple households, 26.6% were households with a male householder and no spouse or partner present, and 36.7% were households with a female householder and no spouse or partner present. About 21.6% of all households were made up of individuals and 8.5% had someone living alone who was 65 years of age or older.

There were 331 housing units, of which 7.9% were vacant. The homeowner vacancy rate was 0.0% and the rental vacancy rate was 0.0%.

Racial composition as of the 2020 census
Race	Number	Percent
White	8	0.7%
Black or African American	3	0.2%
American Indian and Alaska Native	1,154	95.8%
Asian	27	2.2%
Native Hawaiian and Other Pacific Islander	0	0.0%
Some other race	2	0.2%
Two or more races	11	0.9%
Hispanic or Latino (of any race)	16	1.3%

=== 2000 census ===
As of the census of 2000, there were 1,092 people, 271 households, and 227 families residing in the CDP. The population density was 285.1 inhabitants per square mile (110.1/km^{2}). There were 301 housing units at an average density of 78.6 per square mile (30.3/km^{2}). The racial makeup of the CDP was 98.5% Native American, 1.0% White, 0.2% from other races, and 0.3% from two or more races. 0.6% of the population were Hispanic or Latino of any race.

There were 271 households, out of which 51.7% had children under the age of 18 living with them, 46.1% were married couples living together, 31.7% had a female householder with no husband present, and 16.2% were non-families. 15.5% of all households were made up of individuals, and 2.2% had someone living alone who was 65 years of age or older. The average household size was 4.0 and the average family size was 4.4.

In the CDP, the population was spread out, with 43.6% under the age of 18, 9.2% from 18 to 24, 26.1% from 25 to 44, 17.0% from 45 to 64, and 4.0% who were 65 years of age or older. The median age was 23 years. For every 100 females, there were 92.9 males. For every 100 females age 18 and over, there were 84.4 males.

The median income for a household in the CDP was $20,987, and the median income for a family was $22,633. Males had a median income of $25,469 versus $17,813 for females. The per capita income for the CDP was $6,940. About 32.2% of families and 40.0% of the population were below the poverty line, including 46.5% of those under age 18 and 8.0% of those age 65 or over.

== Transportation ==
The White Mountain Apache Tribe operates the Fort Apache Connection Transit, which provides local bus service.

== See also ==
- List of census-designated places in Arizona
