= Fort Apache Indian Reservation =

Native American nation in Arizona

Coordinates: 33°55′42″N 110°07′58″W

White Mountain Apache Tribe of the Fort Apache Reservation
Dził Łigai Si'án N'dee (Western Apache)
- Flag of the White Mountain Apache tribe

- Location of the Fort Apache Indian Reservation

Total population
- 12,429

Regions with significant populations
- United States (Arizona)

Languages
- Western Apache, English

Religion
- Christianity (especially Catholicism and Lutheranism), White Mountain Apache Culture

Related ethnic groups
- Western Apache, San Carlos Apache, Navajo

The Fort Apache Indian Reservation is an Indian reservation in Arizona, United States, encompassing parts of Navajo, Gila, and Apache counties. It is home to the federally recognized White Mountain Apache Tribe of the Fort Apache Reservation (Western Apache language: Dził Łigai Si'án N'dee), a Western Apache tribe. It has a land area of approximately 1.67 million acres, and its population was 12,429 according to the 2000 census. The largest community is in Whiteriver.

== History ==
Apache is a colonial classification term for the White Mountain Apache and all other Apache peoples. The White Mountain Apache consisted of three major groups that were made up of sub-groups called bands and clans, within which were families. There were clan rules controlling marriages between persons of families in different clans.

The largest of these three groups were collectively known as "On Top of Mountains People", the second major group was known as "Many Go to War People", and the last was known as "At the Base of the Mountains People". These names in indigenous White Mountain Apache dialect predate relations with the United States. Some contemporary White Mountain Apache have urged the adoption and use of these terms for the three major groups.

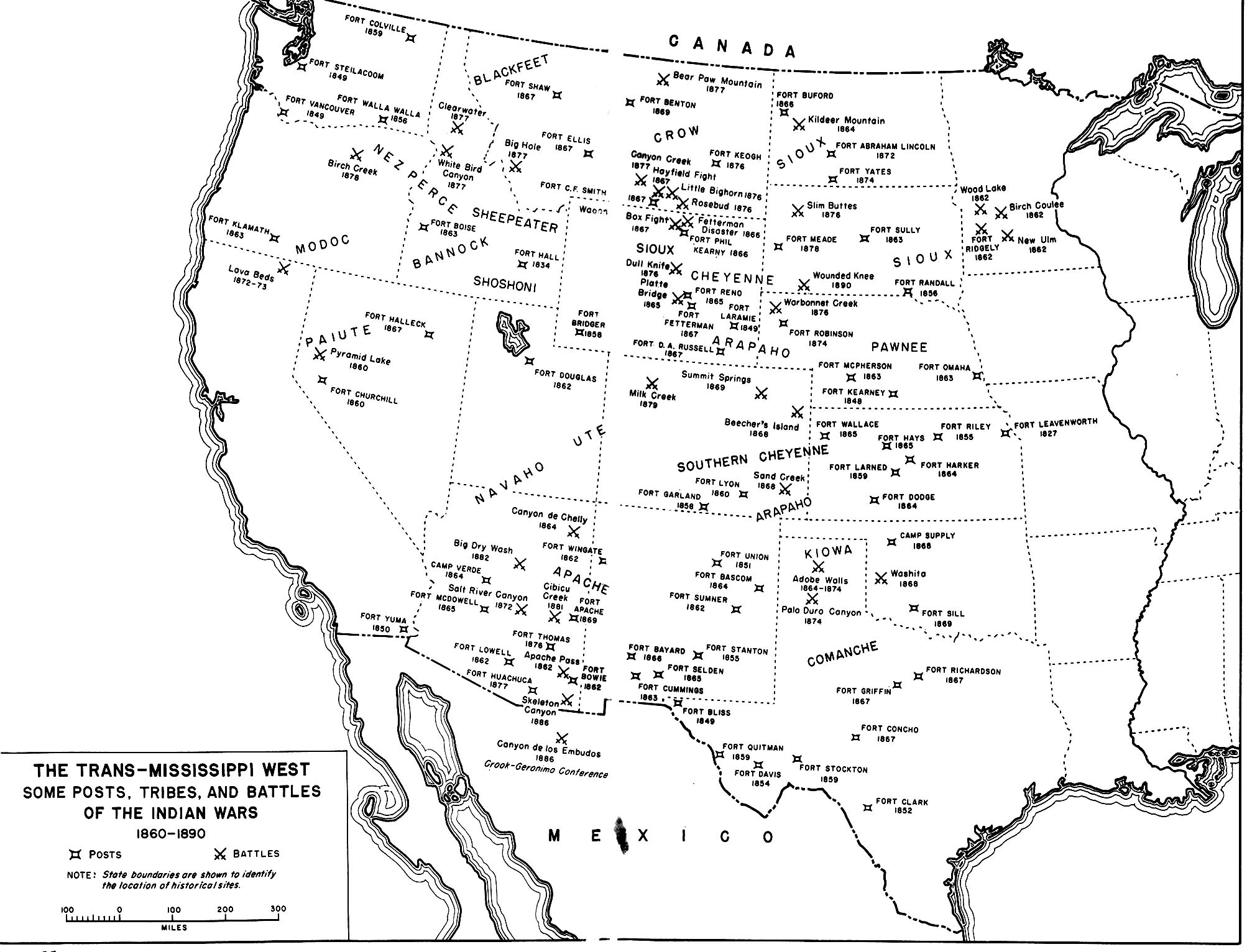
The U.S. Army / U.S. Cavalry post of Ft. Apache was located midway along and just west of the Arizona Territory's eastern border (north/south line) with the adjacent New Mexico Territory to the east after the splitting / separation in 1863 of Arizona from the larger New Mexico, established 1850.

The United States Army's U.S. Cavalry military post of Fort Apache, now the Fort Apache Historic Park, originally called Camp Apache, was established by the Army in 1870 at the suggestion of the White Mountain Apache leadership. They knew that the neighboring Navajo were resisting U.S. federal government supervision. After warfare, the U.S. forced the Navajo and Mescalero Apache on the Long March to relocate to Fort Sumner further east in the New Mexico Territory in 1863–1864, where they were held nearby at Bosque Redondo for years. They were finally allowed to return to their southwestern homeland in 1868.

In 1871 General George Crook enrolled 50 White Mountain Apache men to serve as scouts for his army during the Apache Wars, which lasted intermittently for 15 years. These wars ended with the surrender of Chiricahua leader Geronimo in 1886. Because of the scouts' service to General Crook during the Apache Wars, he worked to enable the White Mountain Apache tribe to keep a large portion of their homeland as their reservation (named for them).

Four decades later in 1922, four years after the end of the First World War (1914/1917-1918), the United States Army left Fort Apache, which was surrounded by the reservation. It was transferred to the jurisdiction of the civilian United States Department of the Interior's Bureau of Indian Affairs in 1923 for further use. The BIA established an Indian Boarding School here in order to continue to make further use of these facilities. It was named after 26th President Theodore Roosevelt (1858-1919, served 1901-1909).

The school was designated as a National Historic Landmark in 2012, as a contributing part of Fort Apache Historic Park. The entire former military complex was recognized, as well as the role of the school in tribal assimilation.

The White Mountain Apache now operate the Roosevelt Indian School as a tribally controlled middle-school facility. They have a contractual arrangement with the Bureau of Indian Education, which funds the school.

== Government ==
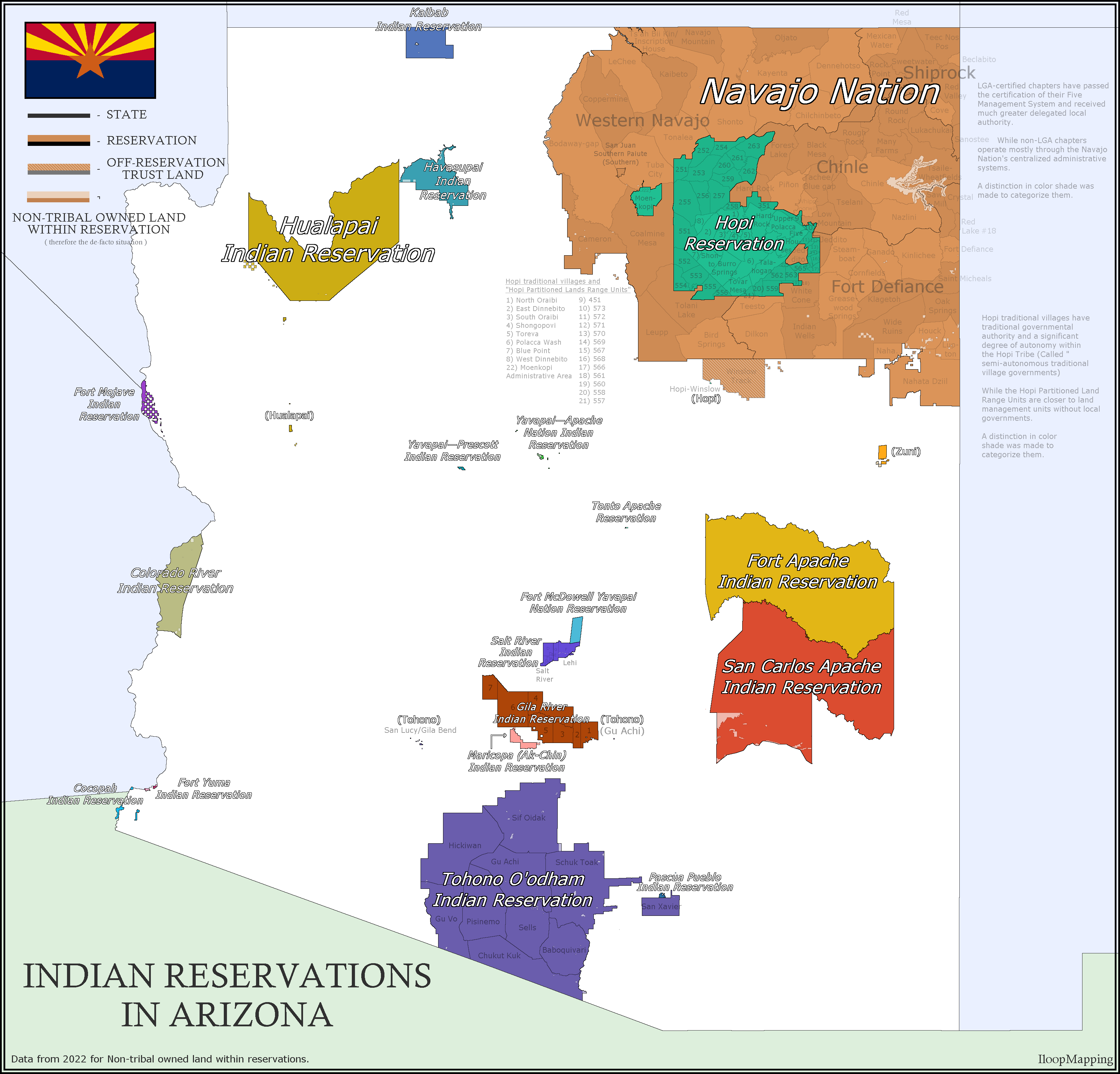
Map of the Fort Apache Indian Reservation and neighboring tribes

The White Mountain Apache created their own constitution under the Indian Reorganization Act of 1934. In 1936 they elected a tribal council that governs the tribe and reservation. It oversees all tribe-owned property, local businesses, and governance.

== Geography ==
The Fort Apache Indian Reservation is covered mostly by pine forests and is habitat to a variety of forest wildlife. It is located directly south of the Mogollon Rim. The highest point in the reservation is Baldy Peak, with an elevation of 11,403 feet (3,476 m).

== Economy ==
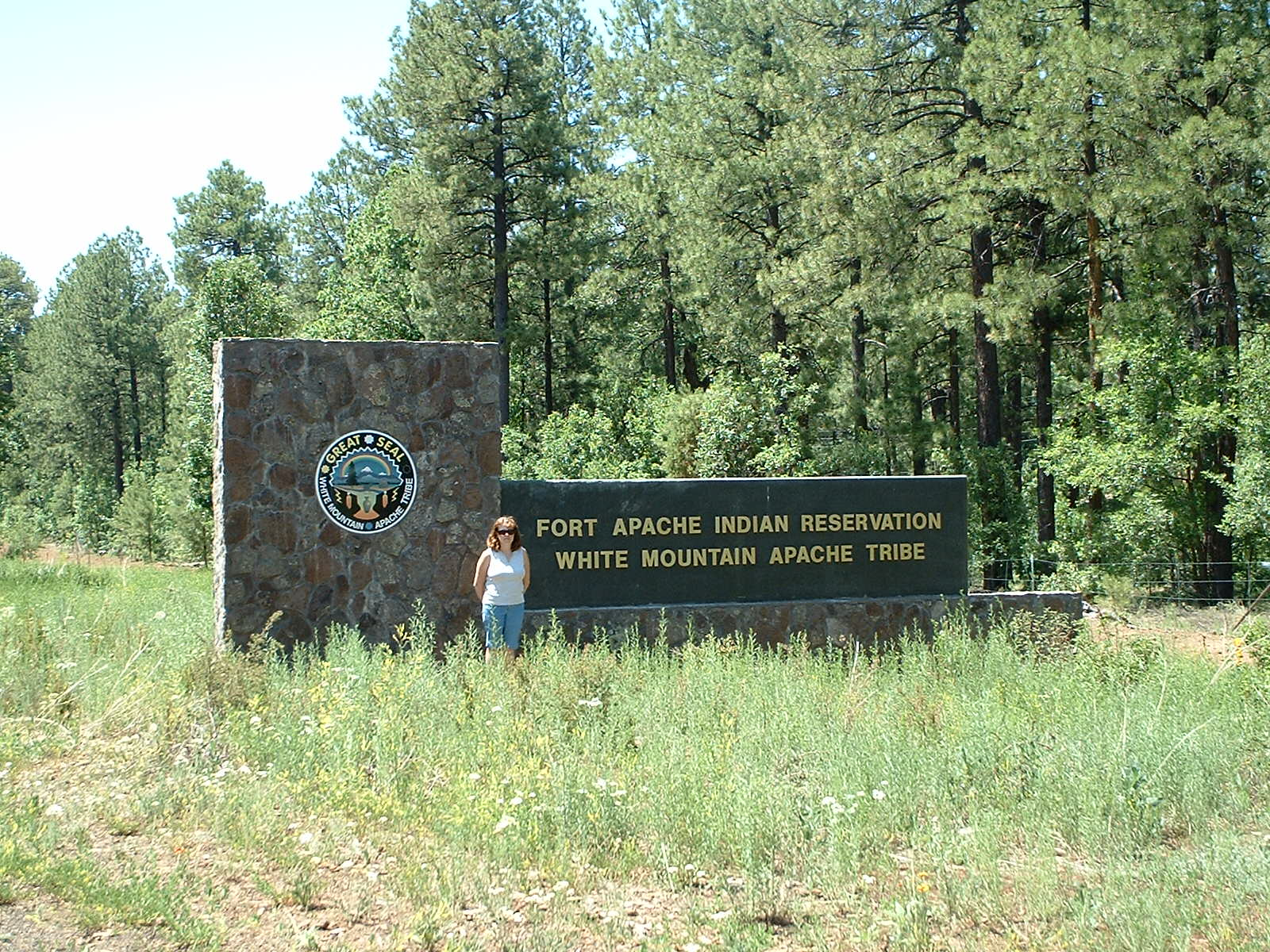
The Fort Apache Indian Reservation, south of Pinetop-Lakeside, Arizona

The tribe operates the Sunrise ski resort and the Hon-Dah Resort Casino and Conference Center. It has built the Apache Cultural Center & Museum, constructed in the traditional style of a gowa.

Other attractions within the reservation include the Fort Apache Historic Park, which has 27 buildings surviving of the historic fort and a 288-acre (117 ha) National Historic District; and other historic sites.

Kinishba Ruins, an ancient archeological site (1150–1350 CE) of the western Pueblo culture, is a National Historic Landmark. It is located on nearby associated tribal trust lands. Appointments may be made to visit the site.

== Demographics ==
According to the US Census Bureau, the Fort Apache Indian Reservation, which is located in Navajo County, is developed with small communities. North Fork, Whiteriver, Fort Apache, East Fork, Rainbow City, Cibecue, Hon-Dah, McNary, Turkey Creek, and Seven Mile are the communities, comprising a total population of 22,036 in 2010 on the reservation.

== Transportation ==
The White Mountain Apache Tribe operates the Fort Apache Connection Transit, which provides local bus service. The City of Show Low operates the Four Seasons Connection, which provides service from the Hondah Casino to Show Low and Pinetop-Lakeside.

== Communities ==
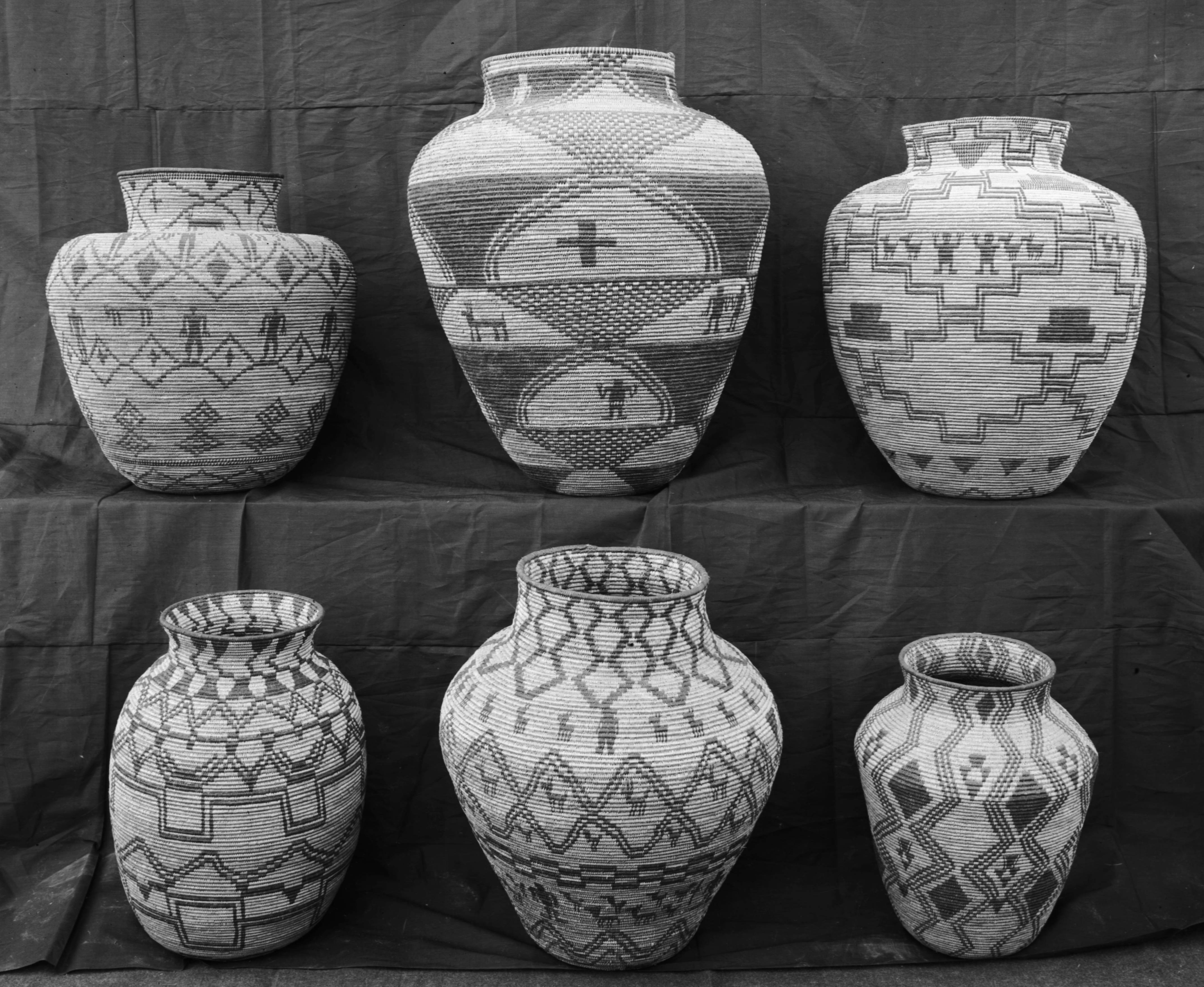
A collection of handwoven Apache Indian baskets, displayed about 1900

- Canyon Day
- Carrizo
- Cedar Creek
- Cibecue
- East Fork
- Fort Apache
- Hondah
- McNary
- North Fork
- Rainbow City
- Seven Mile
- Turkey Creek
- Whiteriver

== Education ==
Young Elementary School District included sections of the reservation. In 1984 the Young district contracted with Whiteriver Unified School District to educate the Fort Apache students, numbering about 200, due to roads being inaccessible between Fort Apache and Young. As of 2020 these parts of the reservation are now directly in Whiteriver USD.

== Notable people ==
- Dustinn Craig (White Mountain Apache/Diné), filmmaker and skateboarder
- Emmet Crawford (1844-1886), military commander

== See also ==
- Apache
- Art of the American Southwest
- Battle of Cibecue Creek
- Battle of Fort Apache
- Rattlesnake Fire (2018)
