= Fort Apache, Arizona =

Unincorporated community in the state of Arizona, United States

- Unincorporated community
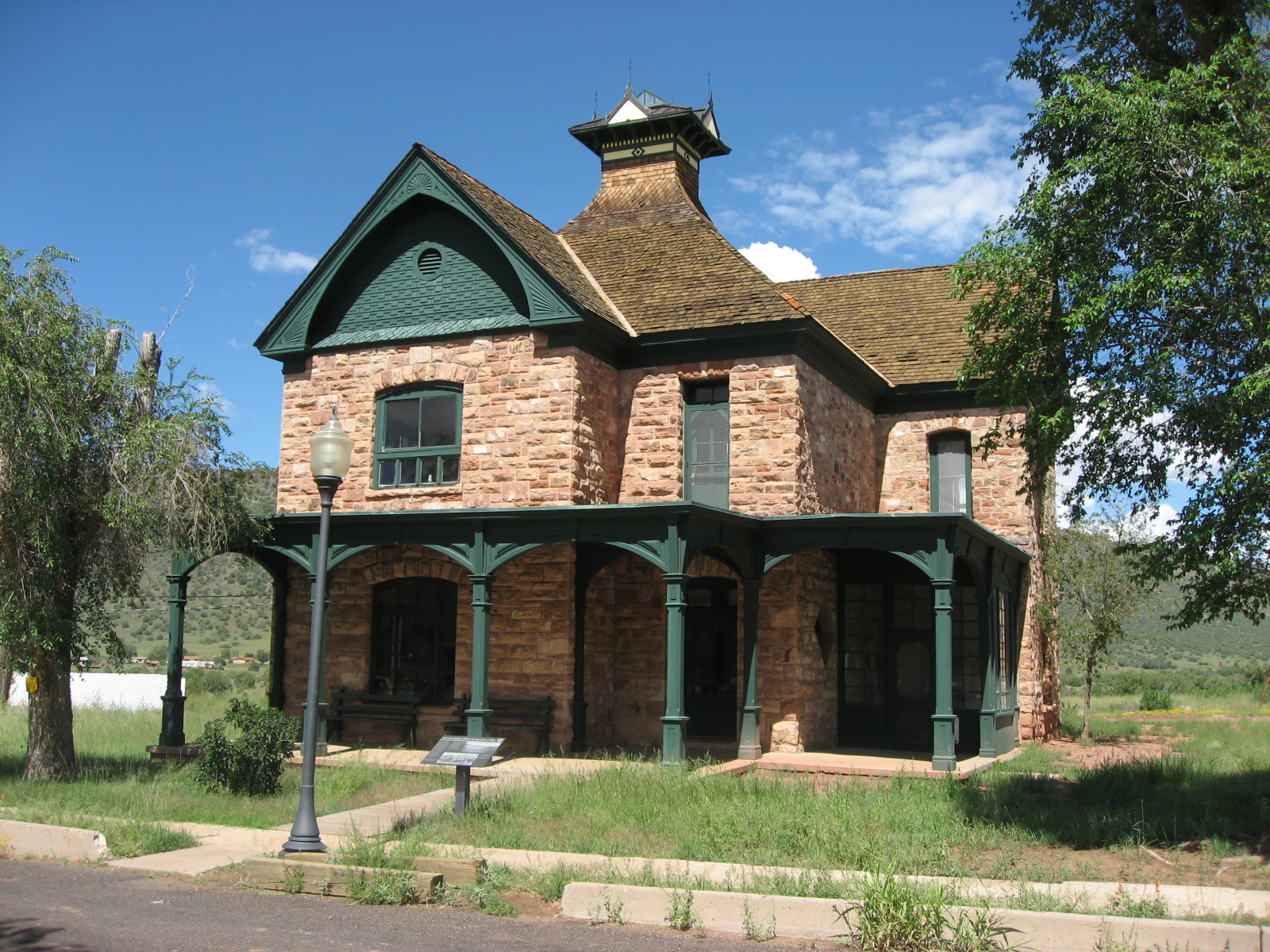
- Commanding Officer's Quarters at Fort Apache Historic Site

- Location of Fort Apache in Navajo County, Arizona.

- Location within Arizona Location within the United States
- Coordinates: 33°47′22″N 109°59′52″W
- Country: United States
- State: Arizona
- County: Navajo

Area
  - Total: 1.15 sq mi (2.98 km^{2})
  - Land: 1.14 sq mi (2.95 km^{2})
  - Water: 0.015 sq mi (0.04 km^{2})
- Elevation: 5,059 ft (1,542 m)

Population (2010)
  - Total: 143
- Time zone: UTC-7 (Mountain (MST))
- ZIP code: 85926
- Area code: 928
- GNIS feature ID: 2582784

Fort Apache (Western Apache: Tłʼog Hagai) is an unincorporated community in Navajo County, Arizona, United States. Today's settlement of Fort Apache incorporates elements of the original U.S. Cavalry post Fort Apache, and lies within the Fort Apache Indian Reservation, home of the White Mountain Apache Tribe, 2 miles (3 km) east of Canyon Day. Fort Apache has a post office with ZIP code 85926.

== Demographics ==
Historical population
Census	Pop.	Note	%±
2010	143		—
2020	113		−21.0%
U.S. Decennial Census

As of the census of 2010, there were 143 people, 46 households, and 36 families residing in Fort Apache.

== Climate ==
This region has warm (but not hot) and dry summers, with no average monthly temperatures above 71.6 °F (22.0 °C). According to the Köppen Climate Classification system, Fort Apache has a warm-summer Mediterranean climate, abbreviated "Csb" on climate maps.

== Transportation ==
The White Mountain Apache Tribe operates the Fort Apache Connection Transit, which provides local bus service.

== See also ==
- Fort Apache (military post)
