= Beasley Run =

Stream in Ohio, U.S.

Coordinates: 39°38′0″N 84°38′30″W

Beasley Run is a stream in the U.S. state of Ohio. The 3.6-mile (5.8 km) long stream is a tributary of Sevenmile Creek.

Beasley Run bears the name of an early settler.

== See also ==
- List of rivers of Ohio
