= Turkey Creek, Arizona =

CDP in Navajo County, Arizona

- CDP
- Location of Turkey Creek in Navajo County, Arizona.

- Location in the United States
- Coordinates: 33°48′04″N 109°56′46″W
- Country: United States
- State: Arizona
- County: Navajo

Area
  - Total: 0.82 sq mi (2.13 km^{2})
  - Land: 0.82 sq mi (2.13 km^{2})
  - Water: 0 sq mi (0.00 km^{2})
- Elevation: 5,250 ft (1,600 m)

Population (2020)
  - Total: 377
  - Density: 458.8/sq mi (177.15/km^{2})
- Time zone: UTC-7 (MST (no DST))
- ZIP code: 85941
- Area code: 928
- FIPS code: 04-77415
- GNIS feature ID: 2582884

Turkey Creek is a census-designated place in Navajo County, in the U.S. state of Arizona, on the Fort Apache Indian Reservation. The population was 294 at the 2010 census.

== Demographics ==
Historical population
Census	Pop.	Note	%±
2010	294		—
2020	377		28.2%
U.S. Decennial Census

As of the census of 2010, there were 294 people, 71 households, and 56 families living in the CDP.

== Transportation ==
The White Mountain Apache Tribe operates the Fort Apache Connection Transit, which provides local bus service.
