= Four Mile Creek (Ohio) =

Stream in Preble and Butler County, Ohio, U.S.

Four Mile Creek is a stream in Preble County and Butler County, Ohio, in the United States.

Four Mile Creek was named from its distance, 4 miles (6.4 km) from Fort Hamilton.

== Location ==
- Mouth: Confluence with Sevenmile Creek (Ohio) north of Hamilton at 39°27′50″N 84°33′20″W
- Source: Preble County at 39°47′26″N 84°45′16″W

== Flow rate ==
At its mouth, the creek's estimated mean annual discharge is 333.8 cubic feet per second (9.45 m^{3}/s). A USGS stream gauge on the creek near Hamilton recorded a mean annual discharge of 301.1 cu ft/s (8.53 m^{3}/s) during water years 1938-1960.

== See also ==
- List of rivers of Ohio
