= Sevenmile Creek (Ohio) =

Stream in Preble and Butler County, Ohio, U.S.

Sevenmile Creek is a stream in Preble County and Butler County, Ohio, in the United States. Sevenmile Creek is a tributary of Great Miami River. Beasley Run and Four Mile Creek (Ohio) is a tributary of the creek.

Sevenmile Creek was named for its distance, seven miles (11 km), from Fort Hamilton. Sevenmile Creek experienced major flooding during the Great Dayton Flood of 1913.

It is spanned by the Roberts Covered Bridge and other bridges.

== Location ==
- Mouth: Confluence with the Great Miami River at 39°25′30″N 84°32′37″W
- Origin: Preble County east of New Paris at 39°51′30″N 84°43′50″W

== Flow rate ==
At its mouth, the creek's estimated mean annual discharge is 143.2 cubic feet per second (4.05 m^{3}/s). A USGS stream gauge on the creek at Sevenmile recorded a mean annual discharge of 160.2 cu ft/s (4.54 m^{3}/s) during water years 1916–1920.

== See also ==
- List of rivers of Ohio
