= Jacob John Glossbrenner =

American bishop (1812–1887)

Jacob John Glossbrenner (1812–1887) was since 1845 the fourteenth Bishop of the Church of the United Brethren in Christ.

== Birth and family ==
Jacob John Glossbrenner was born 24 July 1812 in Hagerstown, Maryland. His parents were Lutheran. His father was killed by an accident when Jacob was only seven years old. His mother and he and his three siblings were left in very straitened circumstances. Jacob was therefore apprenticed to a silversmith to learn his trade.

== Conversion and call ==
Jacob was converted to evangelical Christianity at the age of seventeen. This changed the current of his life. A year later he was Licensed to Exhort in the United Brethren Church. Another year, when only nineteen, he became an itinerant preacher.

== See also ==
- List of bishops of the United Methodist Church
