= Seven Mile Beach =

Seven Mile Beach can refer to:

- Seven Mile Beach, Grand Cayman, in the Caribbean
- Seven Mile Beach (New South Wales), in the Kiama region of New South Wales, Australia
- Seven Mile Beach, Tasmania, near Lauderdale, Tasmania, Australia
