= Henry Kumler Sr. =

American bishop (1775–1854)

Henry Kumler Sr. (1775–1854) was a bishop of the Church of the United Brethren in Christ in the USA, elected in 1825.

Henry's son Henry Kumler Jr was also elected bishop. His grandson Daniel Kumler Flickinger was also a bishop, as well as carrying out missionary work in Sierra Leone.

He was buried in Miltonville near Trenton, Ohio.

== See also ==
- List of bishops of the United Methodist Church
