= Seven Mile River =

Seven Mile River or Sevenmile River may refer to a waterway in the United States:

- Seven Mile River (East Brookfield River) in Massachusetts
- Sevenmile River (Tenmile River) in Massachusetts and Rhode Island
