= Sevenmile Creek (Wisconsin River tributary) =

Stream in Wisconsin, U.S.

Coordinates: 44°16′54″N 89°53′11″W

Sevenmile Creek is a stream in the U.S. state of Wisconsin. It is a tributary to the Wisconsin River.

Sevenmile Creek was so named for its distance, seven miles (11 km) from the original Grand Rapids townsite. The name sometimes is spelled out "Seven Mile Creek".
