= Sevenmile Creek (South Dakota) =

Stream in South Dakota, U.S.

Coordinates: 42°59′57″N 98°29′29″W

Sevenmile Creek is a stream in the U.S. state of South Dakota.

Sevenmile Creek runs about 7 miles (11 km) in length, hence the name.

== See also ==
- List of rivers of South Dakota
