= Elias Kumler House =

Historic house in Ohio, United States

- U.S. National Register of Historic Places
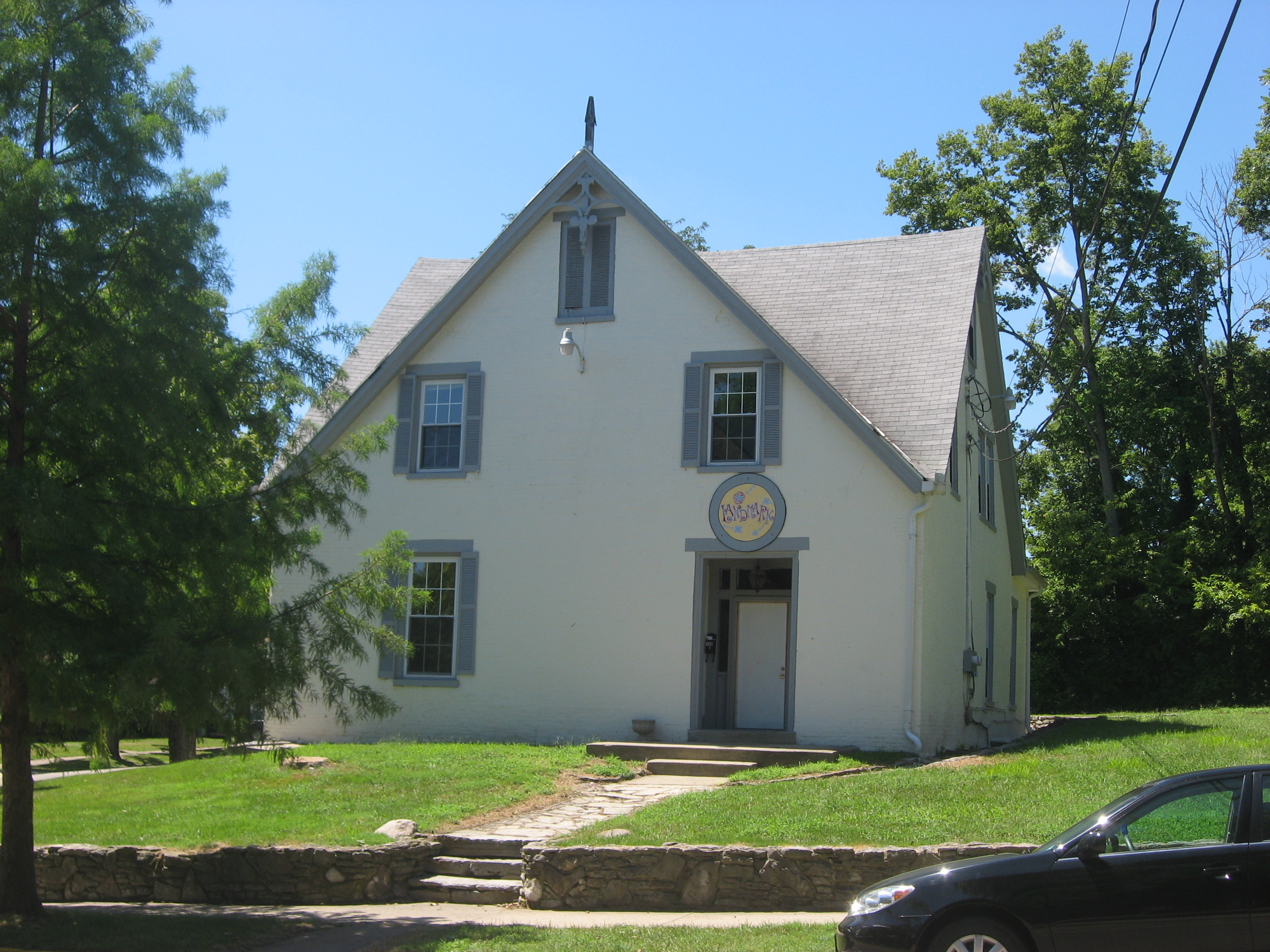
- Front of the house

- Location within Ohio Location within the United States
- Location: 120 S. Main St., Oxford, Ohio
- Coordinates: 39°30′31″N 84°44′34″W
- Area: Less than 1 acre (0.40 ha)
- Built: 1856
- Architectural style: Gothic Revival
- NRHP reference No.: 80002948
- Added to NRHP: January 3, 1980

The Elias Kumler House is a historic residence in Oxford, Ohio, United States. Constructed in the 1850s, it was originally the home of Elias Kumler, who held large influence at multiple educational institutions in Oxford. The house has been continuously used for residential purposes, and it has been named a historic site.

== History ==
Born in 1830 and named Jeremiah Prophet Elias Kumler in full, the house's first owner spent parts of his early life farming and working as a merchant, but he later became the first banker in Oxford. By the 1850s, Kumler had become wealthy enough to engage in philanthropy, donating money in 1856 toward the construction of the Junction Railway between Hamilton, Ohio and Connersville, Indiana. He also served Oxford's two women's colleges and a Cincinnati seminary, sitting on the board of trustees for the Western College for Women from 1871 to 1898, acting as a trustee for the Oxford Female Institute, giving funds to found the endowment for the Lane Theological Seminary, providing money to rescue Western when it was nearly bankrupt, and financing the Female Institute.

The present house was constructed in 1856, and Kumler owned it until selling it to Cincinnati shipping magnate Ebenezer Lane in 1868. Lane owned it for twenty years until selling it to local businessman Frank Cone. The house was Cone's home into the 1920s, but it later became privately owned rental housing for Miami University students. No longer home to its owners, the house deteriorated to the point that Oxford's city government condemned it as a danger to public safety. However, it was purchased and sold by a man more interested in repair than destruction; he restored the house to structural integrity and sold it in 1979.

== Architecture ==
Built of brick with elements of wood and sandstone, and resting on a foundation of ashlar, the house is one-and-a-half stories tall with a steep gabled roof. The gables are placed symmetrically, with one on each of the four sides, and the corners of the roof rise from each corner. Some of the gable peaks and roof corners are ornamented by finials, while the eaves are highlighted by large bargeboards. Stone lintels surround many of the windows, and the house is entered primarily through an off-center trabeated door recessed into the facade. These elements combine to form a high-quality example of the Gothic Revival style of architecture; although less significant than some Gothic Revival houses elsewhere in the state, it is Oxford's leading house of the style.

== Historic site ==
The Kumler House appeared in a book of old Oxford houses, published in 1975, and in early 1977 it was recorded by the Ohio Historic Inventory, a historic preservation program of the Ohio Historical Society. The survey deemed its condition to be excellent, both inside and out, and it was considered eligible for addition to the National Register of Historic Places. In January 1980, the house was added to the National Register because of its architecture, for it was more elaborate than all other Gothic Revival buildings in Oxford. It is one of eleven National Register-listed locations citywide.
