= Seven Mile, Arizona =

CDP in Navajo County, Arizona

- CDP
- Location of Seven Mile in Navajo County, Arizona.

- Location in the United States
- Coordinates: 33°47′18″N 109°57′27″W
- Country: United States
- State: Arizona
- County: Navajo

Area
  - Total: 2.27 sq mi (5.89 km^{2})
  - Land: 2.26 sq mi (5.86 km^{2})
  - Water: 0.0077 sq mi (0.02 km^{2})
- Elevation: 5,158 ft (1,572 m)

Population (2020)
  - Total: 742
  - Density: 327.8/sq mi (126.57/km^{2})
- Time zone: UTC-7 (MST (no DST))
- ZIP code: 85941
- Area code: 928
- FIPS code: 04-65780
- GNIS feature ID: 2582865

Seven Mile is a census-designated place in Navajo County, in the U.S. state of Arizona, on the Fort Apache Indian Reservation. The population was 707 at the 2010 census.

== Demographics ==
Historical population
Census	Pop.	Note	%±
2010	707		—
2020	742		5.0%
U.S. Decennial Census

As of the census of 2010, there were 707 people, 166 households, and 147 families living in the CDP.

== Transportation ==
The White Mountain Apache Tribe operates the Fort Apache Connection Transit, which provides local bus service.
