= Hondah, Arizona =

- CDP
- Location within the state of Arizona Hondah (the United States)
- Coordinates: 34°05′10″N 109°54′54″W
- Country: United States
- State: Arizona
- County: Navajo

Area
  - Total: 12.20 sq mi (31.61 km^{2})
  - Land: 12.17 sq mi (31.52 km^{2})
  - Water: 0.035 sq mi (0.09 km^{2})
- Elevation: 7,166 ft (2,184 m)

Population (2020)
  - Total: 814
  - Density: 66.9/sq mi (25.83/km^{2})
- Time zone: UTC-7 (MST)
- Area code: 928
- FIPS code: 04-33440
- GNIS feature ID: 2582798

Hondah is a census-designated place (CDP) in Navajo County, Arizona, United States, on the Fort Apache Indian Reservation. The population was 812 at the 2010 census.

Hondah is home to the Hon-Dah Resort Casino and Conference Center, operated by the tribe.

== Geography ==
According to the United States Geological Survey, the CDP has a total area of 12.28 square miles (31.8 km^{2}), 12.24 square miles (31.7 km^{2}) land and 0.04 square miles (0.10 km^{2}) water.

== Demographics ==
Historical population
Census	Pop.	Note	%±
2010	812		—
2020	814		0.2%
U.S. Decennial Census

As of the 2010 census, there were 812 people living in the CDP: 401 male and 411 female. 349 were 19 years old or younger, 185 were ages 20–34, 166 were between the ages of 35 and 49, 76 were between 50 and 64, and the remaining 36 were aged 65 and above. The median age was 23.5 years.

The racial makeup of the CDP was 92.7% American Indian, 3.3% White, 0.2% Black or African American, 0.2% Asian, 0.4% Other, and 3.1% two or more races. 5.0% of the population were Hispanic or Latino of any race.

There were 211 households in the CDP, 177 family households (83.9%) and 34 non-family households (16.1%), with an average household size of 3.85. Of the family households, 91 were married couples living together, with 24 single father households and 62 single mother households; the non-family households included 23 adults living alone: 13 male and 10 female.

The CDP contained 286 housing units, of which 211 were occupied and 75 were vacant.

== Transportation ==
The White Mountain Apache Tribe operates the Fort Apache Connection Transit, which provides local bus service. The City of Show Low operates the Four Seasons Connection, which provides service from the Hondah Casino to Show Low and Pinetop-Lakeside.
