= Fort Apache Historic Park =

Historic place in Gila County, Arizona

- Fort Apache and Theodore Roosevelt School
- U.S. National Register of Historic Places
- U.S. National Historic Landmark District
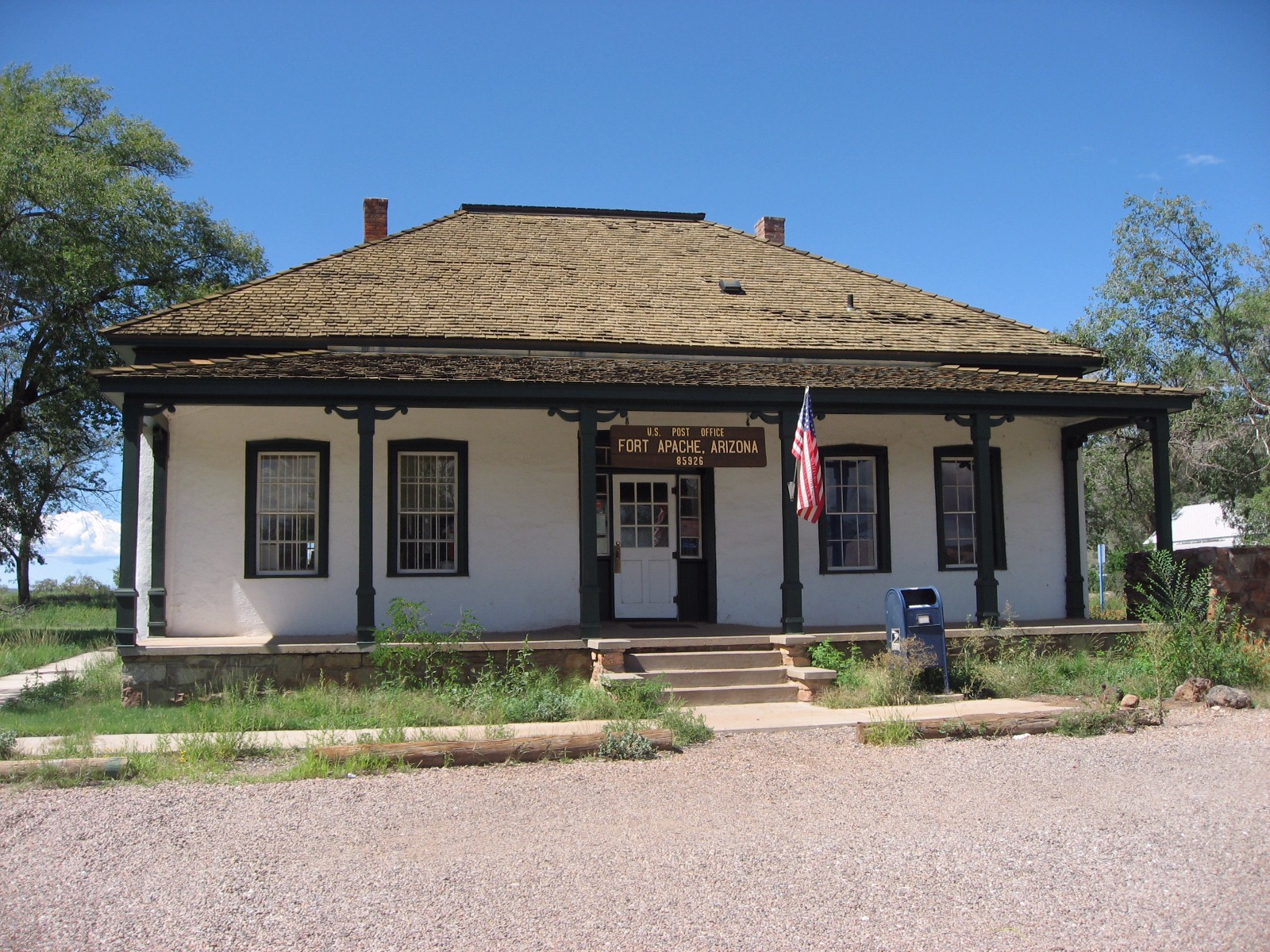
- The former 1876 adjutant's office, now the Fort Apache Post Office

- Location within Arizona Location within the United States
- Location: Fort Apache Indian Reservation, Gila County, Arizona, US
- Nearest city: Fort Apache, Arizona
- Coordinates: 33°47′23″N 109°59′21″W
- Area: 293 acres (119 ha)
- NRHP reference No.: 76000377

Significant dates
- Added to NRHP: October 14, 1976
- Designated NHLD: March 2, 2012

Fort Apache Historic Park (Tł’óghagai in Apache) is a tribal historic park of the White Mountain Apache, located at the former site of Fort Apache on the Fort Apache Indian Reservation. The park interprets the rich and troubled history of relations between the Apache and other Native American tribes at the fort, which was converted into a Bureau of Indian Affairs boarding school after its military use ended. The park, which covers 288 acres (117 ha) of the former fort and school, as well as a nearby military cemetery, form the National Historic Landmark Fort Apache and Theodore Roosevelt School historic district.

== Description and history ==
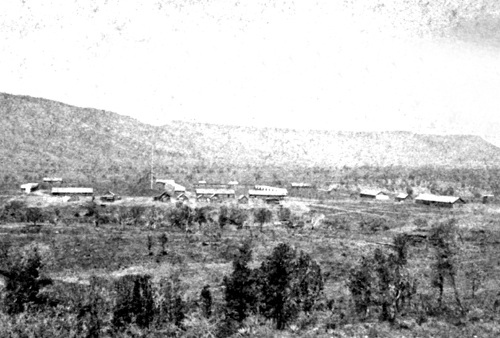
Fort Apache in 1873

Fort Apache is located in the southern part of the Fort Apache Indian Reservation, about 4 miles (6.4 km) south of the reservation capital at Whiteriver just east of Arizona State Route 73. The park includes a landscape of 27 historic buildings, ruins and remnants of others, and the fort's former parade ground. The White Mountain Apache Cultural Center (Nohwike’ Bágowa, or House of Our Footprints, in Apache), is located at the western end of the park. The post was situated at the end of a military road built into Apachería. Its purpose was to control the Coyotero Apaches. At first it was a temporary camp called Camp Ord later changed to Camp Mogollon, Camp Thomas and Camp Apache. It became a permanent facility in 1873 and in 1879 the name was changed to Fort Apache.

The fort was established in 1870 as a temporary military camp, and was placed on a more permanent footing ten years later. It played a crucial role in the Indian Wars of the late 19th century, serving first as a check on Apache control of the area, and later as a recruitment point for Apaches as scouts in conflicts with other tribes. The fort was one of the places where African-American Buffalo Soldiers were stationed. Only a few buildings survive from the early years of the fort's history, including a log cabin that served as an early commandant's quarters, a guardhouse, and an adjutant's office. Barracks and other quarters built in the 1880s and 1890s also survive.

Its use as a military facility obsolete, the property was in 1923 turned over to the Bureau of Indian Affairs (BIA), which established the Theodore Roosevelt School on the property. It was established as a boarding school providing educational services to several Native tribes in the region. Although it was located on Apache tribal land, the school was mainly intended to educate Navajo youth, by removing them from their reservation and encouraging the adoption of non-Native customs. This practice of the BIA was widely disliked by the tribes.

During the school's boarding period (a tribal school of the same name continues to operate in some of the buildings) a variety of further buildings were added to the site, including a cafeteria, additional dormitories, and maintenance buildings. A significant number of these buildings still survive, and have been repurposed to other functions by the tribe.

== Historic structures of Fort Apache ==
The following are images of some of the historical ruins and remaining structures in Fort Apache.

- The First Commanding Officer's Quarters a.k.a. "General Crook's Cabin" – built in 1871
- The Commanding Officer's Quarters – built in 1892
- The Captain's Quarters (102) – built in 1891
- The Captain's Quarters (103) – built in 1891
- The Officer's Quarters – built in 1883
- The Girl's Dormitory – Native-American girl's dormitory built in 1931 where the Fort's hospital once stood
- The Boy's Dormitory – Native-American boys dormitory built in 1932
- The Bureau of Indian Affairs Club House – built in 1930
- The Theodore Roosevelt School – built in 1923
- The Theodore Roosevelt School Cafeteria – built in 1948
- The Barracks ruins – built in the 1880s
- Fort ruins – c. 1880s
Historic Fort Apache

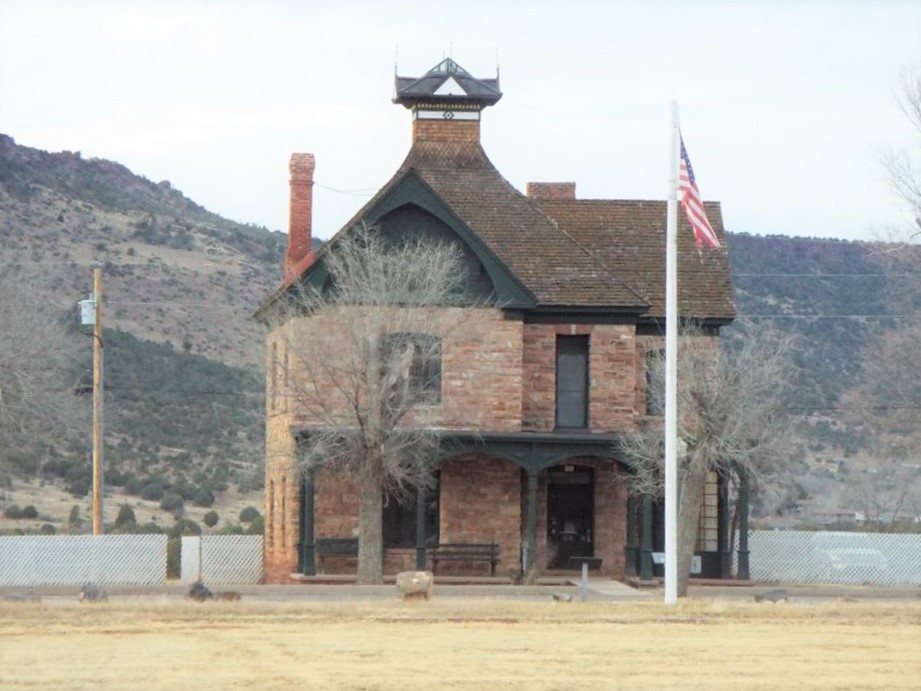
Commanding Officers' Quarters

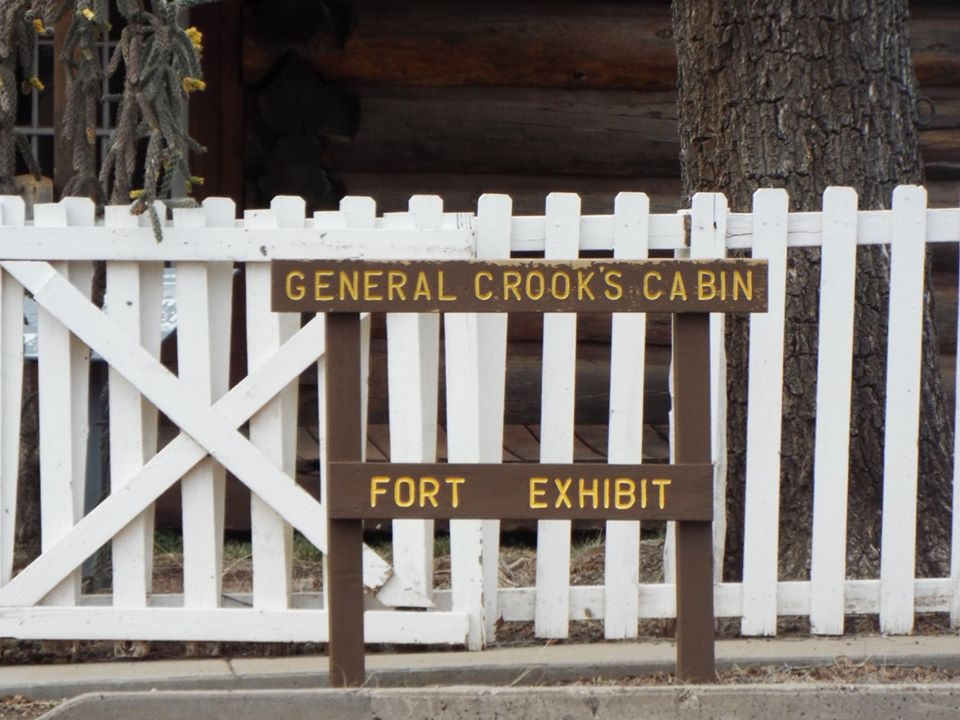
General Crooks Cabin sign

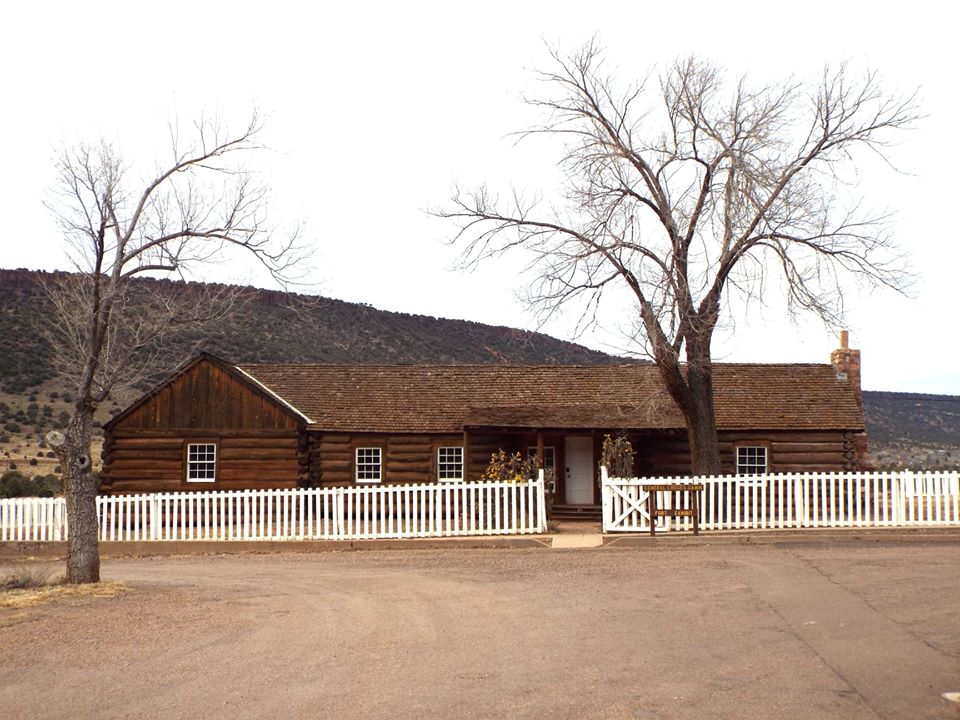
First Commanding Officer's Quarters (General Crook's Cabin) – 1871

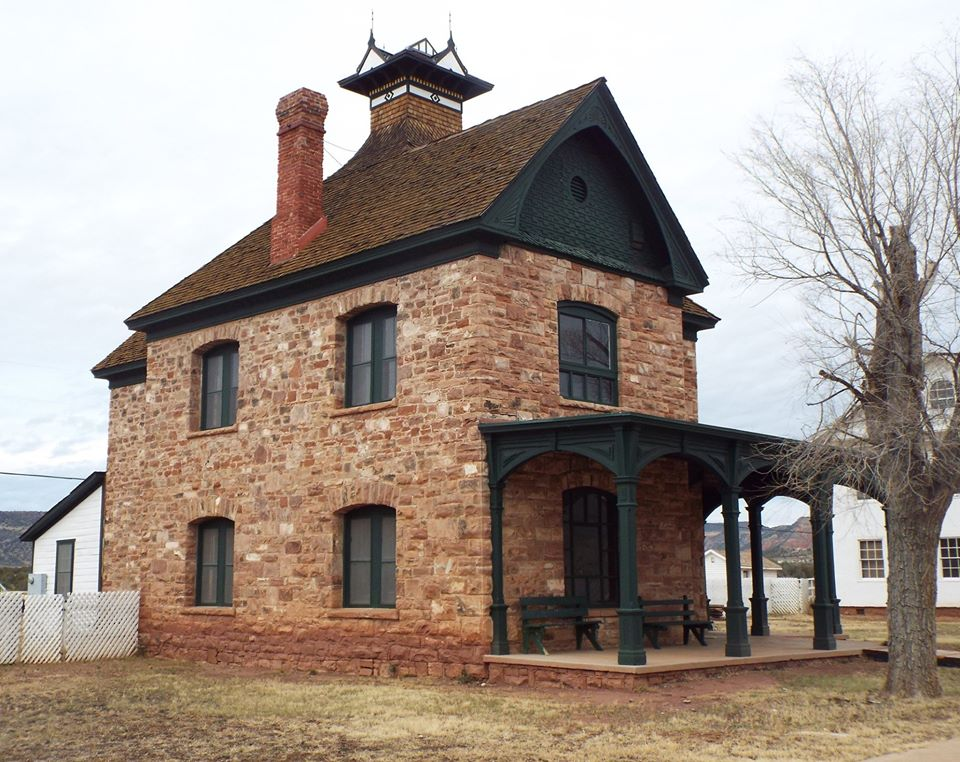
Commanding Officer's Quarters – 1892

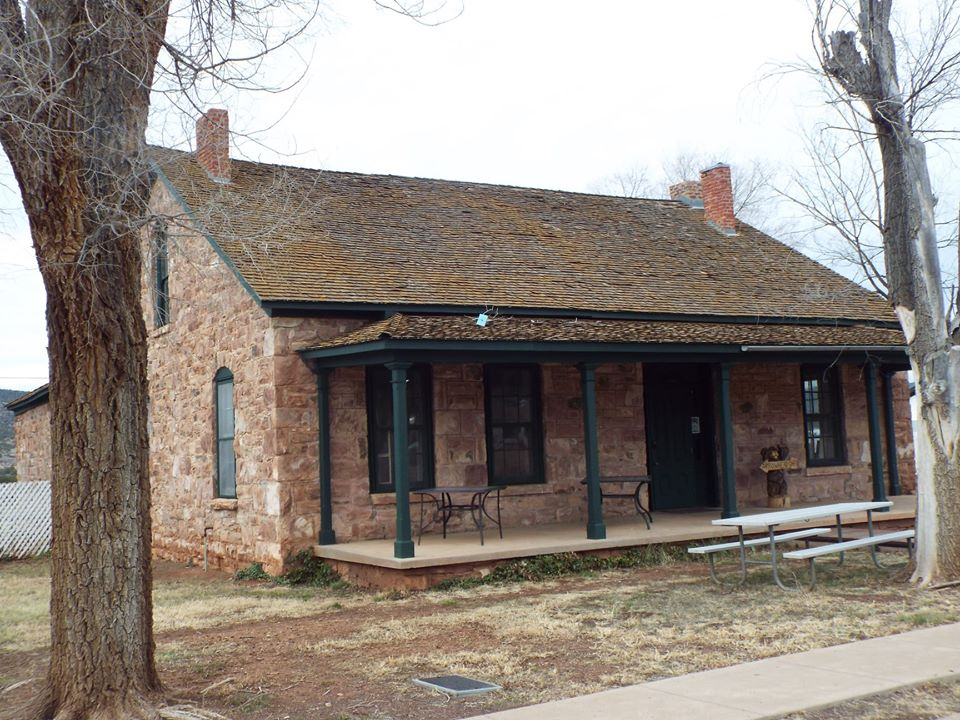
Captain's Quarters (102) – 1891

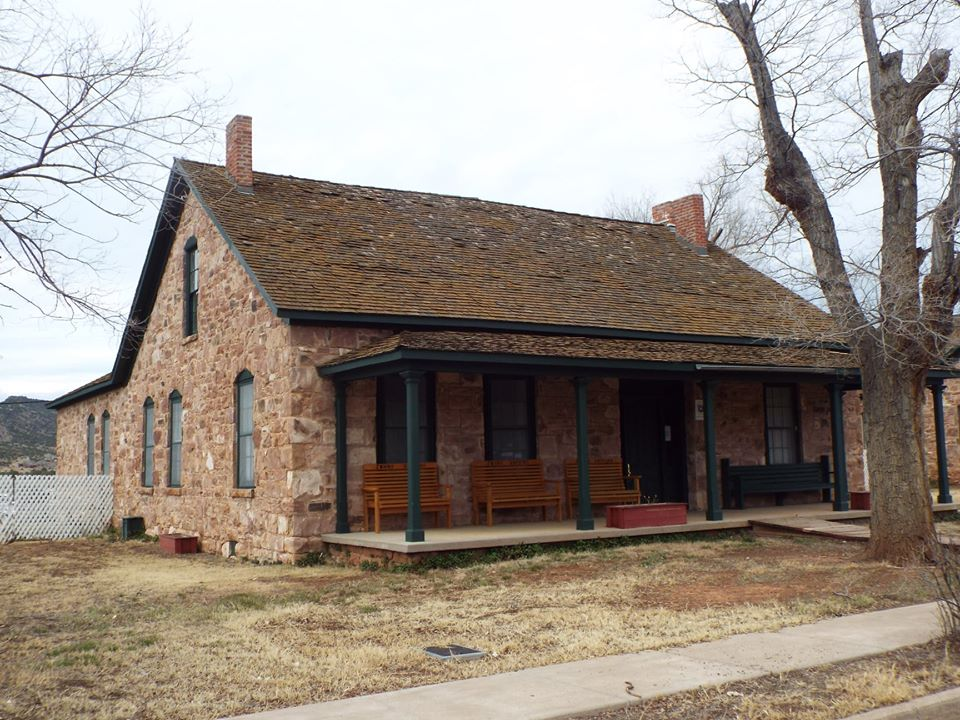
Captain's Quarters (103) – 1891

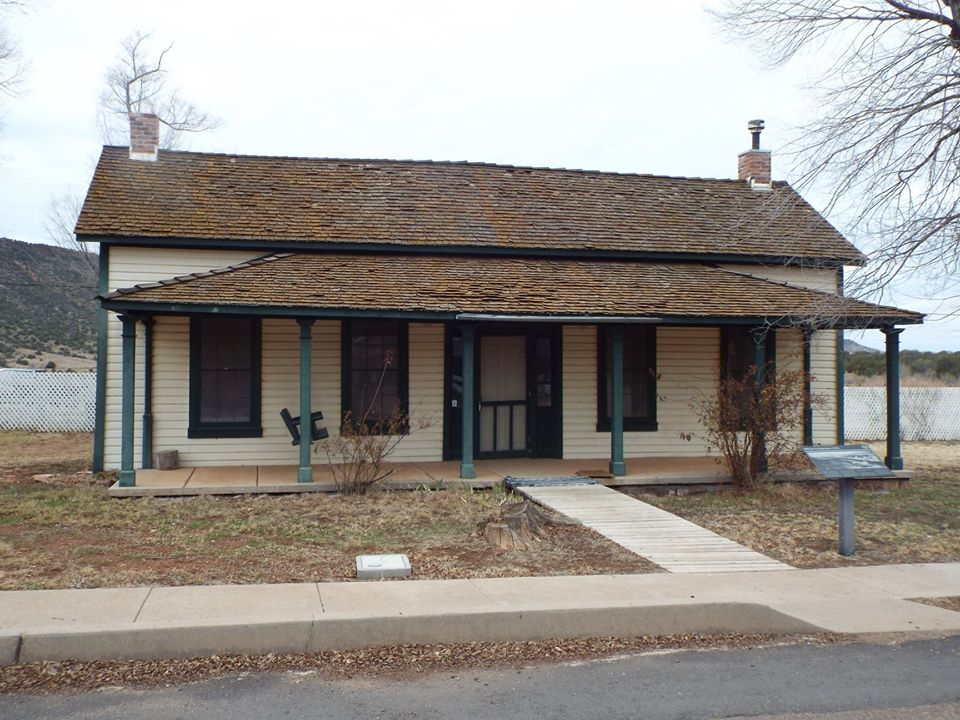
Officer's Quarters – 1883

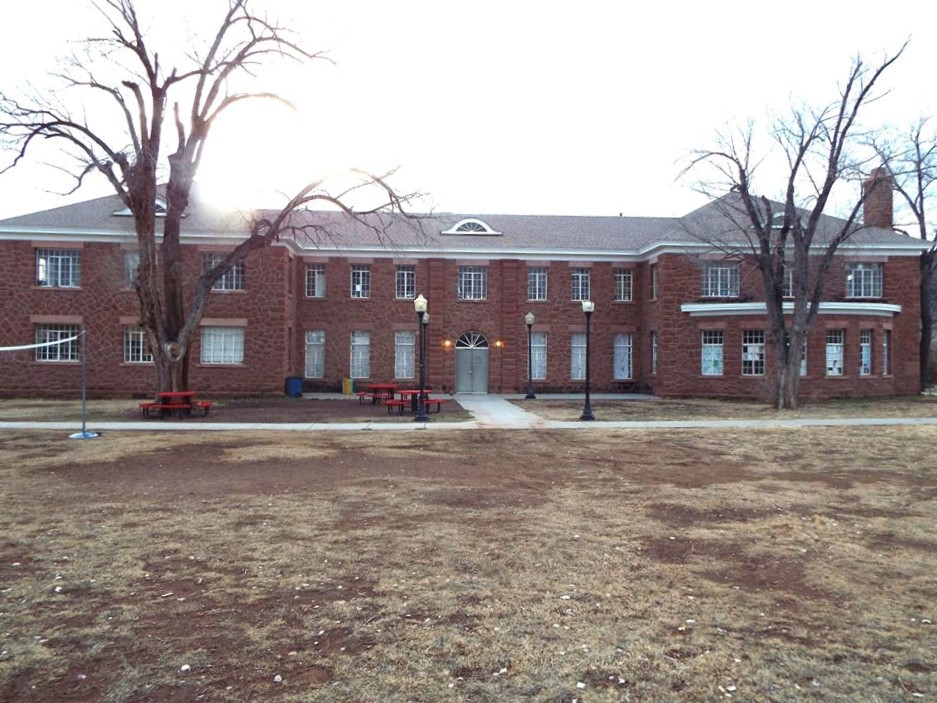
Girl's Dormitory – 1931

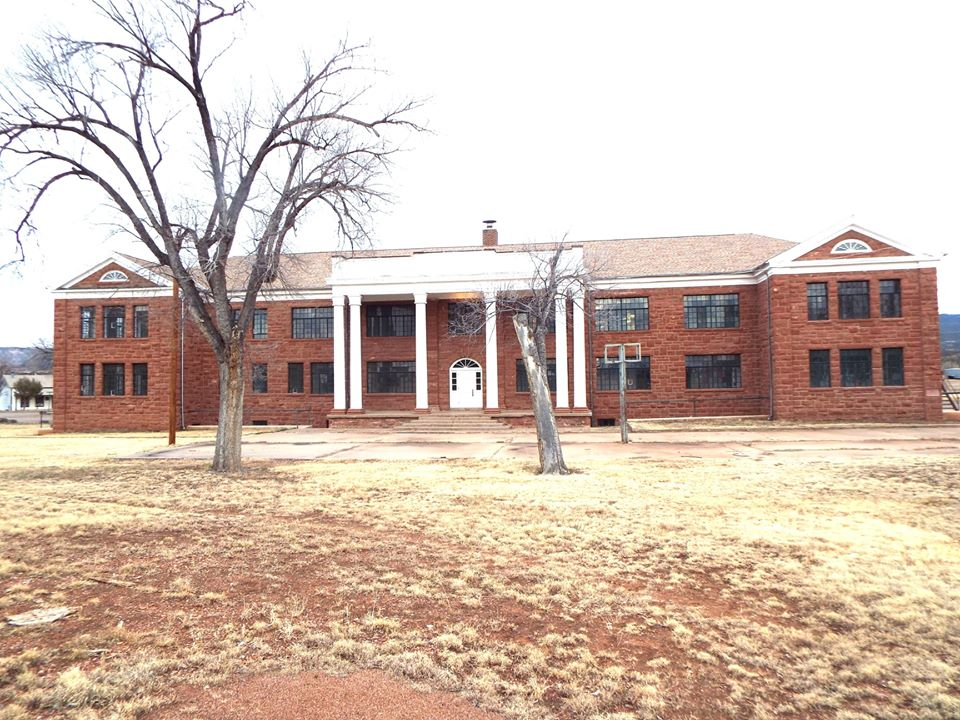
Boy's Dormitory – 1932

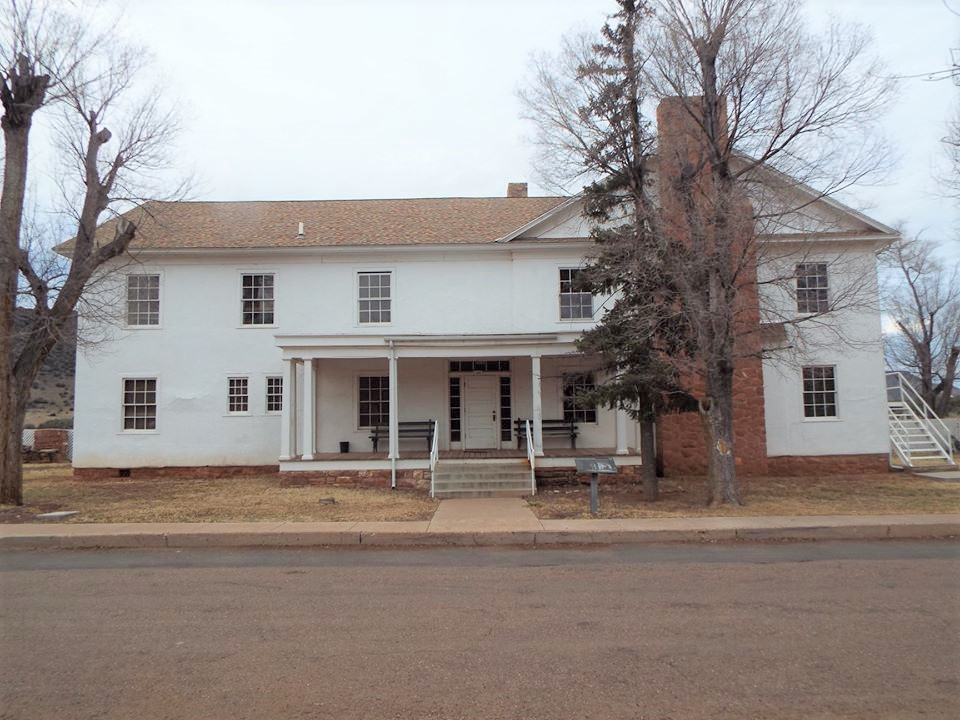
Bureau of Indian Affairs Club House – 1930

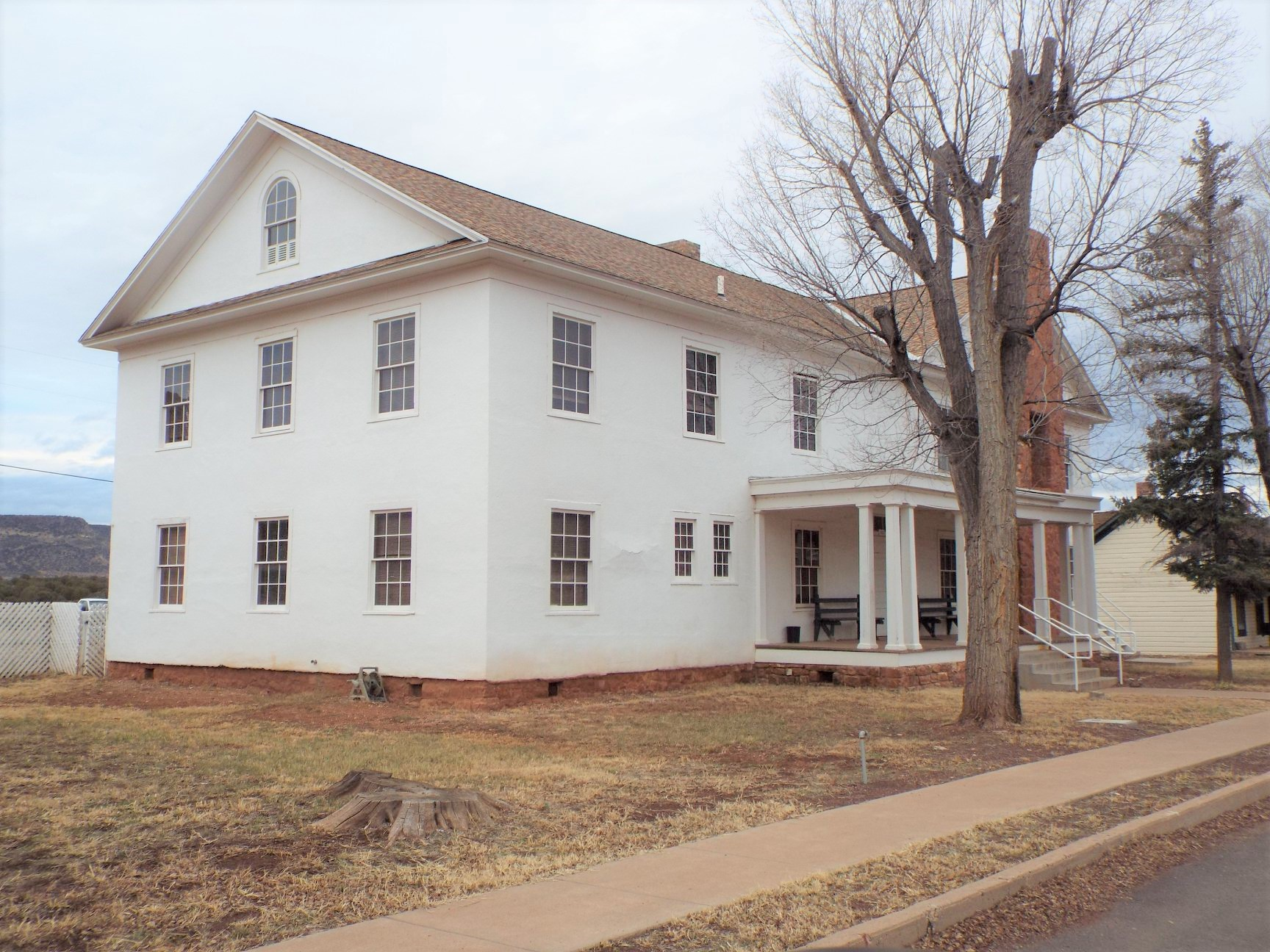
Different view of the Bureau of Indian Affairs Club House – 1930

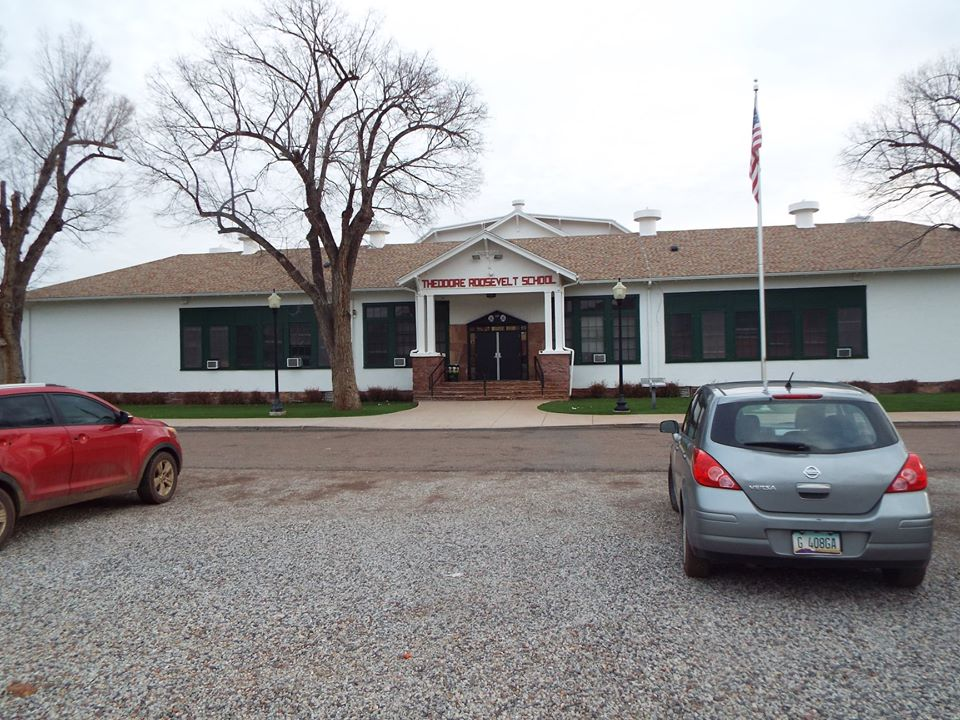
Theodore Roosevelt School – 1923

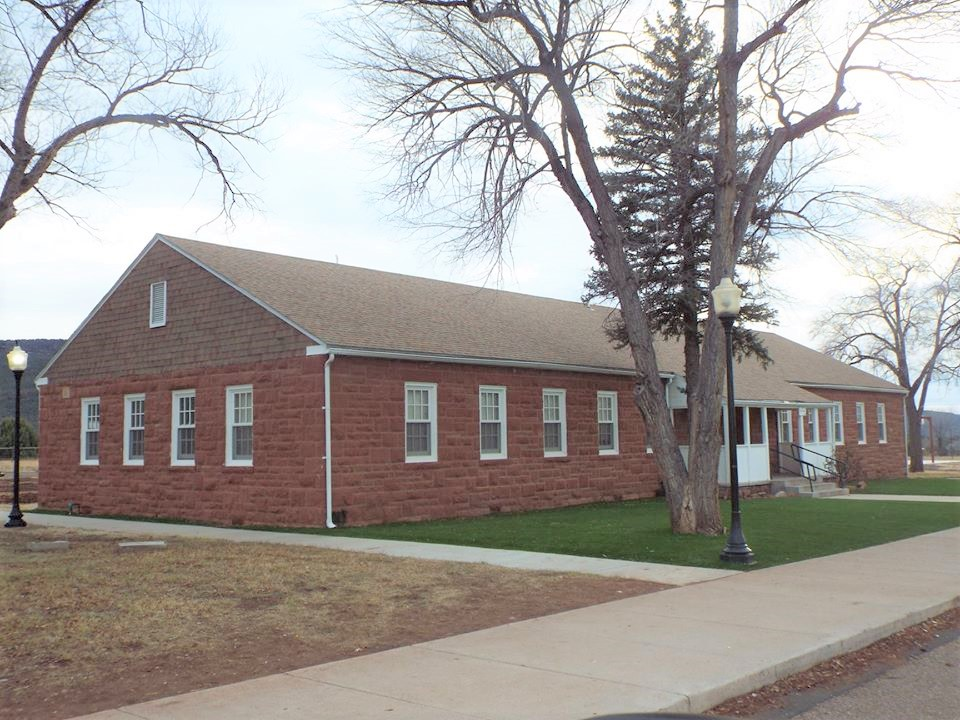
Theodore Roosevelt School Cafeteria – 1948

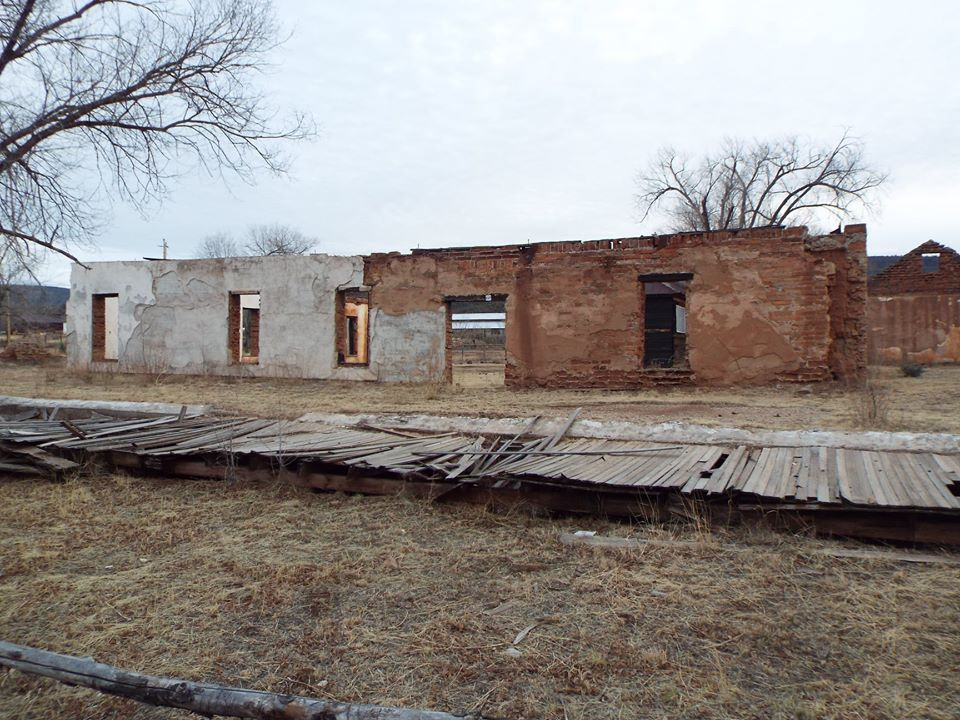
Barracks ruins – 1875

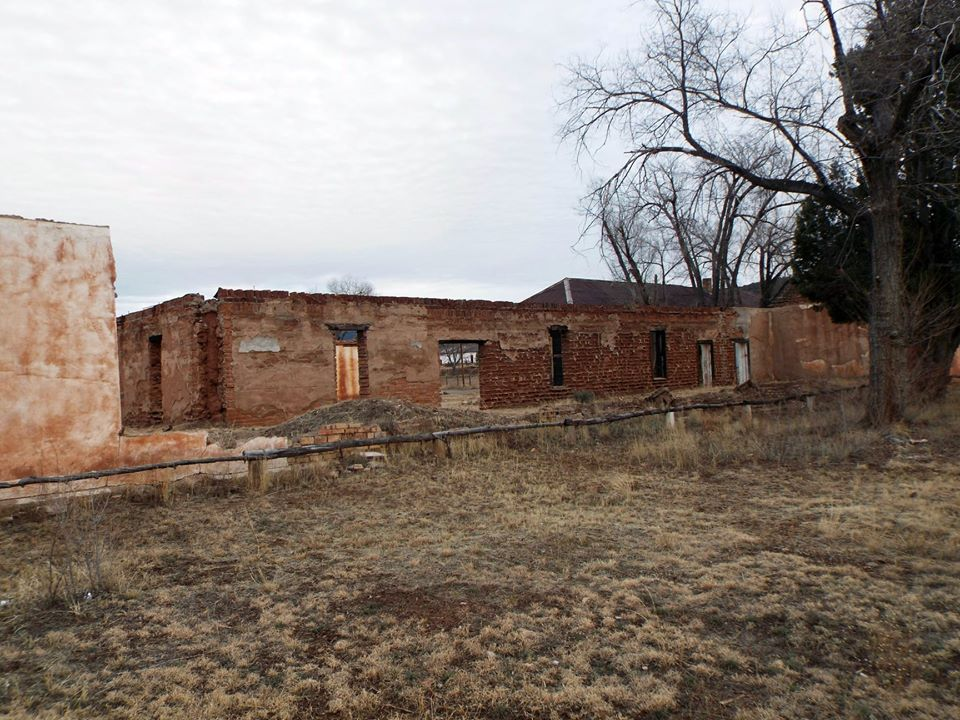
Barracks Row ruins – 1875

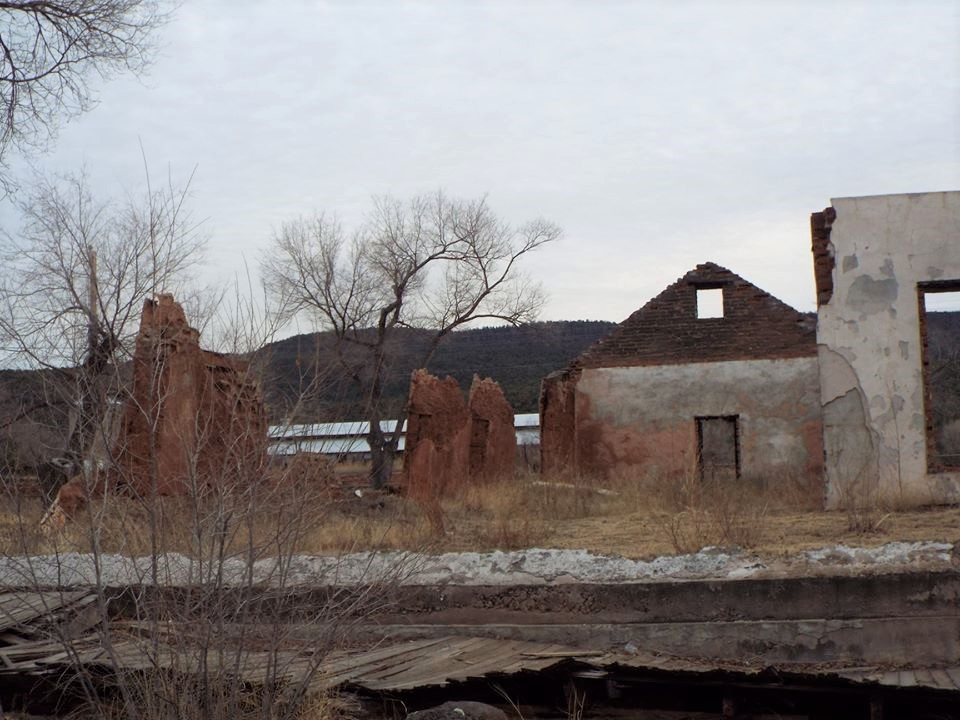
Fort ruins – c. 1880s

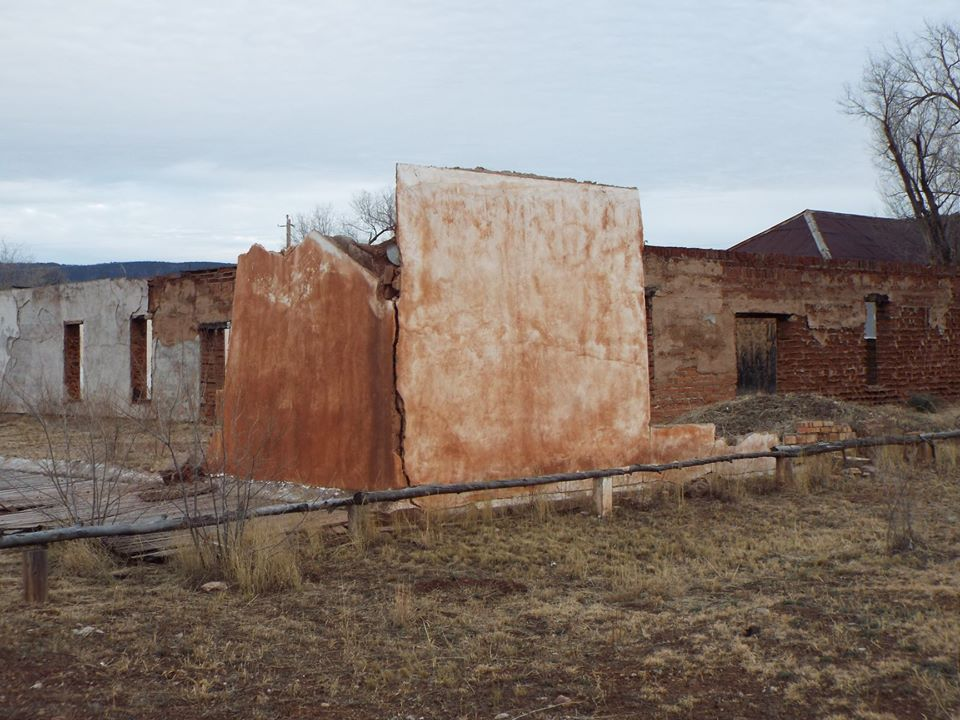
Fort ruins – c. 1880s

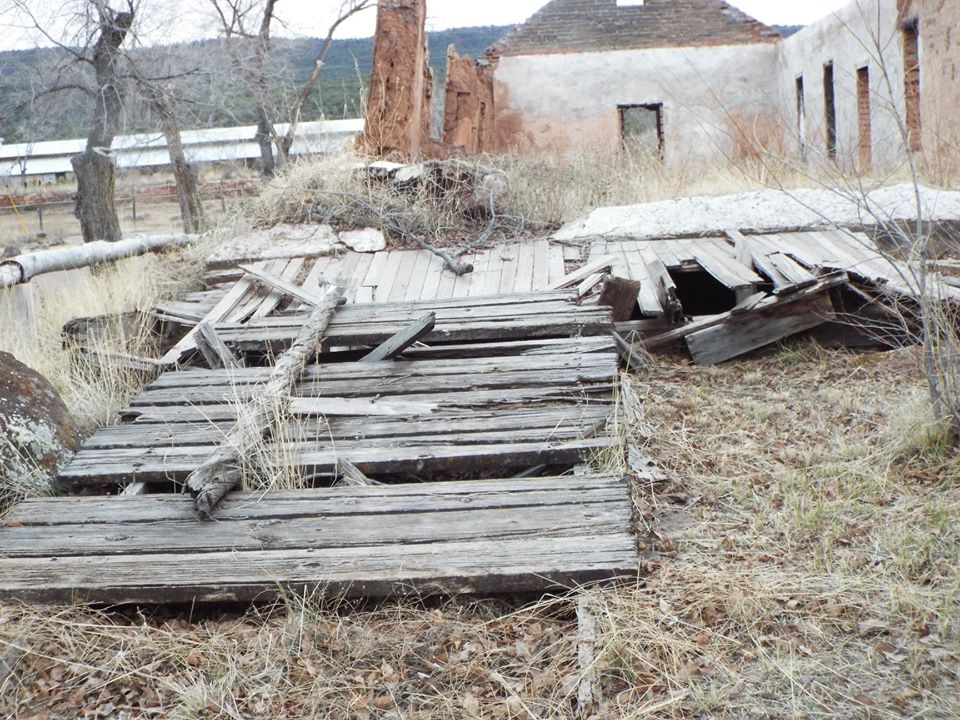
Fort ruins – c. 1880s

== See also ==
- List of National Historic Landmarks in Arizona
- National Register of Historic Places listings in Navajo County, Arizona
