= Seven Mile, Ohio =

- Village
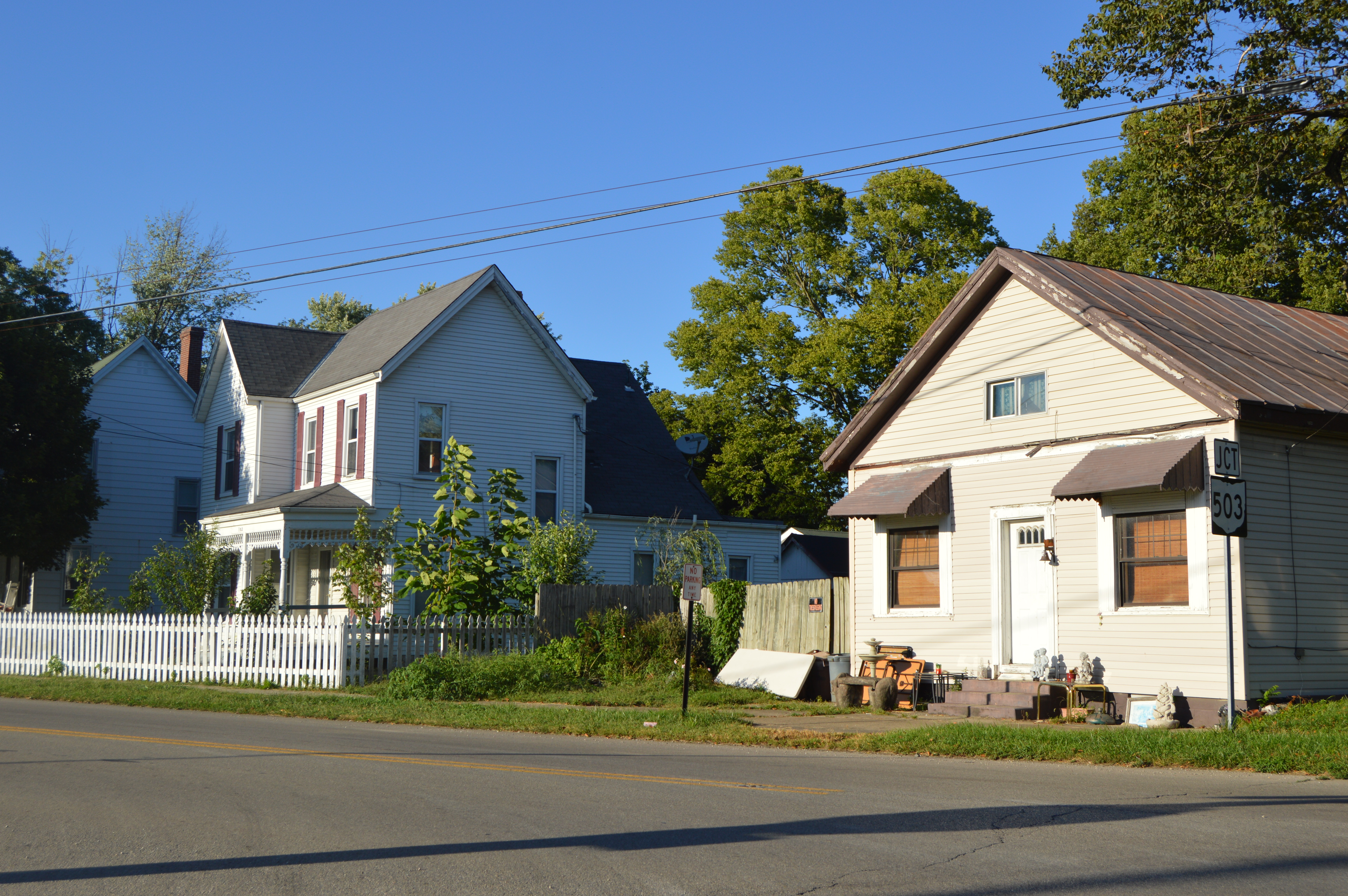
- Houses on Main Street

- Logo
- Motto(s): "Today, Tomorrow, and for Generations"
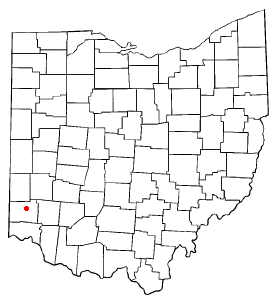
- Location of Seven Mile, Ohio

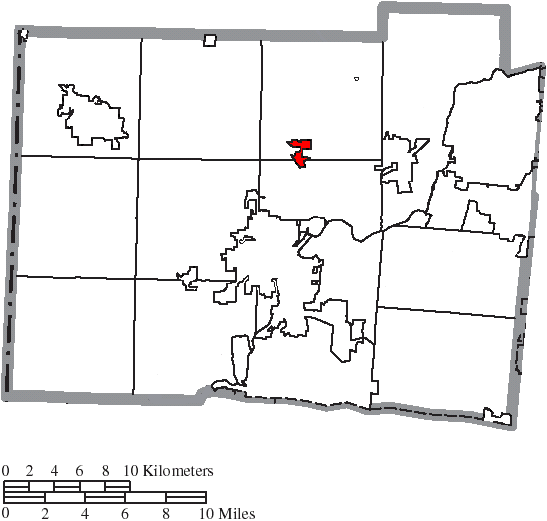
- Location of Seven Mile in Butler County
- Coordinates: 39°29′09″N 84°33′08″W
- Country: United States
- State: Ohio
- County: Butler
- Townships: Wayne, St. Clair

Government
  - Mayor: Melissa Mick

Area
  - Total: 0.72 sq mi (1.87 km^{2})
  - Land: 0.72 sq mi (1.87 km^{2})
  - Water: 0 sq mi (0.00 km^{2})
- Elevation: 686 ft (209 m)

Population (2020)
  - Total: 712
  - Density: 985.0/sq mi (380.32/km^{2})
- Time zone: UTC-5 (Eastern (EST))
  - Summer (DST): UTC-4 (EDT)
- ZIP code: 45062
- Area code: 513
- FIPS code: 39-71444
- GNIS feature ID: 2399787
- Website: villageofsevenmile.org

Seven Mile is a village in Butler County, Ohio, United States. The population was 712 at the 2020 census.

Seven Mile is served by Edgewood Local School District. Seven Mile Elementary School is the only school located within the village limits.

== History ==
On October 6, 1791, 2,200 troops marched to the area and encamped in the bottom on the east side of the creek. The area was then called Seven Mile after the creek name. The Indian name for Seven Mile Creek was Watamaw, meaning shining water.

Seven Mile was laid out on a turnpike in 1841. It took its name from nearby Sevenmile Creek. Seven Mile was incorporated as a village in 1875.

In 1905, Seven Mile contained a hotel, a harness shop, a tin shop, meat store, and a mill. The village was spared during the Great Dayton Flood due to the elevated railroad grade separating it from Sevenmile Creek.

At the turn of the 20th century, the village celebrated a peculiar type of parade called the "Rag'n Fads" where all the children dressed up in the most tattered clothes they owned, according to the April 6, 1901, issue of Leslie's Weekly.

After a 2016 Ohio law legalized marijuana for medicinal uses to treat 21 ailments, including cancer, traumatic brain injury, post-traumatic stress disorder or chronic pain, Seven Mile was chosen as a site for one of only two dispensary locations within Butler County. The location was chosen because of its proximity to Ohio 127 and it is centrally located within a region that includes Butler, Darke and Preble counties. The dispensary opened October 24, 2019.

== Geography ==
According to the United States Census Bureau, the village has a total area of 0.72 square miles (1.86 km^{2}), all land.

== Demographics ==
Historical population
Census	Pop.	Note	%±
1860	193		—
1870	220		14.0%
1880	251		14.1%
1890	268		6.8%
1900	351		31.0%
1910	340		−3.1%
1920	369		8.5%
1930	455		23.3%
1940	549		20.7%
1950	569		3.6%
1960	690		21.3%
1970	699		1.3%
1980	841		20.3%
1990	804		−4.4%
2000	678		−15.7%
2010	751		10.8%
2020	712		−5.2%
U.S. Decennial Census

=== 2010 census ===
As of the census of 2010, there were 751 people, 295 households, and 206 families residing in the village. The population density was 1,043.1 inhabitants per square mile (402.7/km^{2}). There were 317 housing units at an average density of 440.3 per square mile (170.0/km^{2}). The racial makeup of the village was 97.6% White, 0.1% African American, 0.1% Native American, 0.3% Asian, 0.7% from other races, and 1.2% from two or more races. Hispanic or Latino of any race were 1.3% of the population.

There were 295 households, of which 35.6% had children under the age of 18 living with them, 51.5% were married couples living together, 12.9% had a female householder with no husband present, 5.4% had a male householder with no wife present, and 30.2% were non-families. 22.4% of all households were made up of individuals, and 11.2% had someone living alone who was 65 years of age or older. The average household size was 2.55 and the average family size was 2.97.

The median age in the village was 40.3 years. 23.3% of residents were under the age of 18; 8.3% were between the ages of 18 and 24; 24.4% were from 25 to 44; 29.8% were from 45 to 64; and 14.4% were 65 years of age or older. The gender makeup of the village was 48.5% male and 51.5% female.

=== 2000 census ===
As of the census of 2000, there were 678 people, 254 households, and 197 families residing in the village. The population density was 894.6 inhabitants per square mile (345.4/km^{2}). There were 259 housing units at an average density of 341.7 per square mile (131.9/km^{2}). The racial makeup of the village was 98.53% White, 0.29% African American, 0.74% Asian, and 0.44% from two or more races. Hispanic or Latino of any race were 0.74% of the population.

There were 254 households, out of which 36.2% had children under the age of 18 living with them, 63.8% were married couples living together, 10.6% had a female householder with no husband present, and 22.4% were non-families. 18.5% of all households were made up of individuals, and 7.9% had someone living alone who was 65 years of age or older. The average household size was 2.65 and the average family size was 3.04.

In the village, the population was spread out, with 27.5% under the age of 18, 6.8% from 18 to 24, 29.1% from 25 to 44, 21.8% from 45 to 64, and 15.8% who were 65 years of age or older. The median age was 38 years. For every 100 females there were 91.0 males. For every 100 females age 18 and over, there were 88.6 males.

The median income for a household in the village was $41,705, and the median income for a family was $49,000. Males had a median income of $37,917 versus $21,806 for females. The per capita income for the village was $18,092. About 4.5% of families and 4.1% of the population were below the poverty line, including 1.6% of those under age 18 and 4.9% of those age 65 or over.

== Government ==
Seven Mile is run by a 6 member village Council. The mayor holds tie-break authority to break a tie vote. Council members serve 4-year terms and are limited to 5 terms.

Seven Mile operates both a Police Department and a Fire Department. The Police Department employs part-time and auxiliary officers. The Fire Department provides Fire/EMS service in the village and EMS coverage to parts of Wayne and Milford Townships north of the village.
