= Delshire, Ohio =

- Census-designated place
- Location in Hamilton County and the state of Ohio.
- Coordinates: 39°05′19″N 84°35′42″W
- Country: United States
- State: Ohio
- County: Hamilton

Area
  - Total: 0.70 sq mi (1.81 km^{2})
  - Land: 0.70 sq mi (1.81 km^{2})
  - Water: 0 sq mi (0.00 km^{2})
- Elevation: 883 ft (269 m)

Population (2020)
  - Total: 3,158
  - Density: 4,528.2/sq mi (1,748.36/km^{2})
- Time zone: UTC-5 (Eastern (EST))
  - Summer (DST): UTC-4 (EDT)
- Area code: 513
- FIPS code: 39-21610
- GNIS feature ID: 2585506

Delshire is a census-designated place (CDP) in Delhi Township, Hamilton County, Ohio, United States. The population was 3,158 at the 2020 census.

== Geography ==
Delshire is located on a bluff north of the Ohio River. It lies 6 miles (10 km) west of downtown Cincinnati and just east of the community of Delhi Hills.

According to the United States Census Bureau, the CDP has a total area of 0.69 square miles (1.8 km^{2}), all land.

== Demographics ==
=== 2020 census ===
As of the 2020 census, Delshire had a population of 3,158. The population density was 4,530.85 inhabitants per square mile (1,748.36/km^{2}). The median age was 34.5 years; 26.1% of residents were under the age of 18 and 13.9% were 65 years of age or older. For every 100 females, there were 94.7 males, and for every 100 females age 18 and over, there were 92.7 males age 18 and over.

100.0% of residents lived in urban areas, while 0.0% lived in rural areas.

There were 1,097 households, of which 34.0% had children under the age of 18 living in them. Of all households, 46.4% were married-couple households, 17.7% were households with a male householder and no spouse or partner present, and 27.1% were households with a female householder and no spouse or partner present. About 19.9% of all households were made up of individuals, and 9.6% had someone living alone who was 65 years of age or older. The average household size was 2.80, and the average family size was 3.18.

There were 1,149 housing units, of which 4.5% were vacant. The homeowner vacancy rate was 0.6%, and the rental vacancy rate was 6.0%.

Racial composition as of the 2020 census
Race	Number	Percent
White	2,589	82.0%
Black or African American	296	9.4%
American Indian and Alaska Native	4	0.1%
Asian	60	1.9%
Native Hawaiian and Other Pacific Islander	0	0.0%
Some other race	31	1.0%
Two or more races	178	5.6%
Hispanic or Latino (of any race)	83	2.6%

=== Income and poverty ===
According to the U.S. Census American Community Survey, for the period 2016-2020 the estimated median annual income for a household in the CDP was $76,250, and the median income for a family was $59,602. About 21.6% of the population were living below the poverty line, including 36.2% of those under age 18 and 0.0% of those age 65 or over. About 66.0% of the population were employed, and 31.4% had a bachelor's degree or higher.

== Education ==
Delshire is home to Delshire Elementary School, which is a part of the Oak Hills Local School District. Delshire is also home to St. Dominic Catholic School.
