= Our Lady of Victory (Cincinnati) =

Private school in Ohio, United States

Our Lady of Victory School and Church
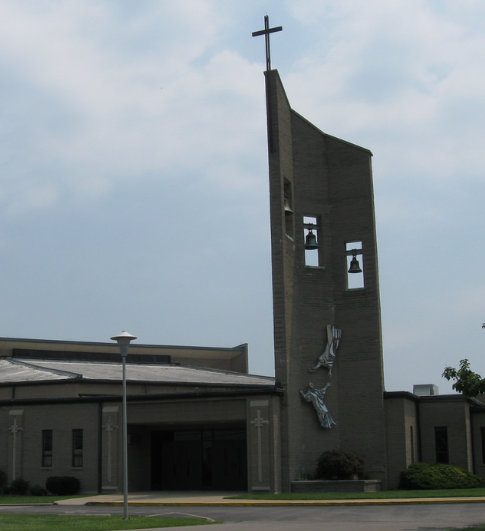

Location
- 810 Neeb Rd. Cincinnati, Ohio, (Hamilton County), Ohio 45233; United States
- Coordinates: 39°06′29″N 84°38′07″W

Information
- Type: Private
- Religious affiliation: Roman Catholic
- Patron saint: Mary
- Established: 1842 (as St. Stephens) 1853 (as Our Lady of Victory)
- School district: Oak Hills Local School District
- Principal: Amy Mattews
- Grades: Pre K-8
- Enrollment: 470 (2017)
- Colors: blue, gold, and light blue
- Slogan: Celebrating Children, Celebrating Our Faith, Celebrating Success
- Mascot: Victor E. Viper
- Nickname: Vipers
- Rival: St. Dominic and Our Lady of the Visitation
- Website: Our Lady of Victory

Our Lady of Victory (OLV) is a Catholic parish in Cincinnati, Ohio. Victory is a part of the Roman Catholic Archdiocese of Cincinnati. It is the third oldest parish in Hamilton County, Ohio, established in 1842 as a log cabin. OLV was originally known as St. Stephens until 1853. The school is one of the largest in the area and is one of only two Catholic elementary schools in Delhi Township, Ohio.

OLV's location in Hamilton County and Ohio

== School ==
OLV serves grades pre-kindergarten through eighth grade. Extra-curricular classes include technology class, art (drawing, painting, and ceramics), Spanish, music, and physical education. When students graduate they attend high schools, including Elder High School, Seton High School (Cincinnati, Ohio), St. Ursula Academy (Cincinnati, Ohio), and St. Xavier High School (Cincinnati Ohio).

List of some clubs, organizations, and other school events

- Environmental Club
- Ambassador Board
- Chess Club
- Book Club
- Math Club
- STEM Club
- Homeroom representatives
- Field Day
- First and Sixth Grade Buddies
- OLV Walk Day
- Blue and Gold Day
- Spelling Bee

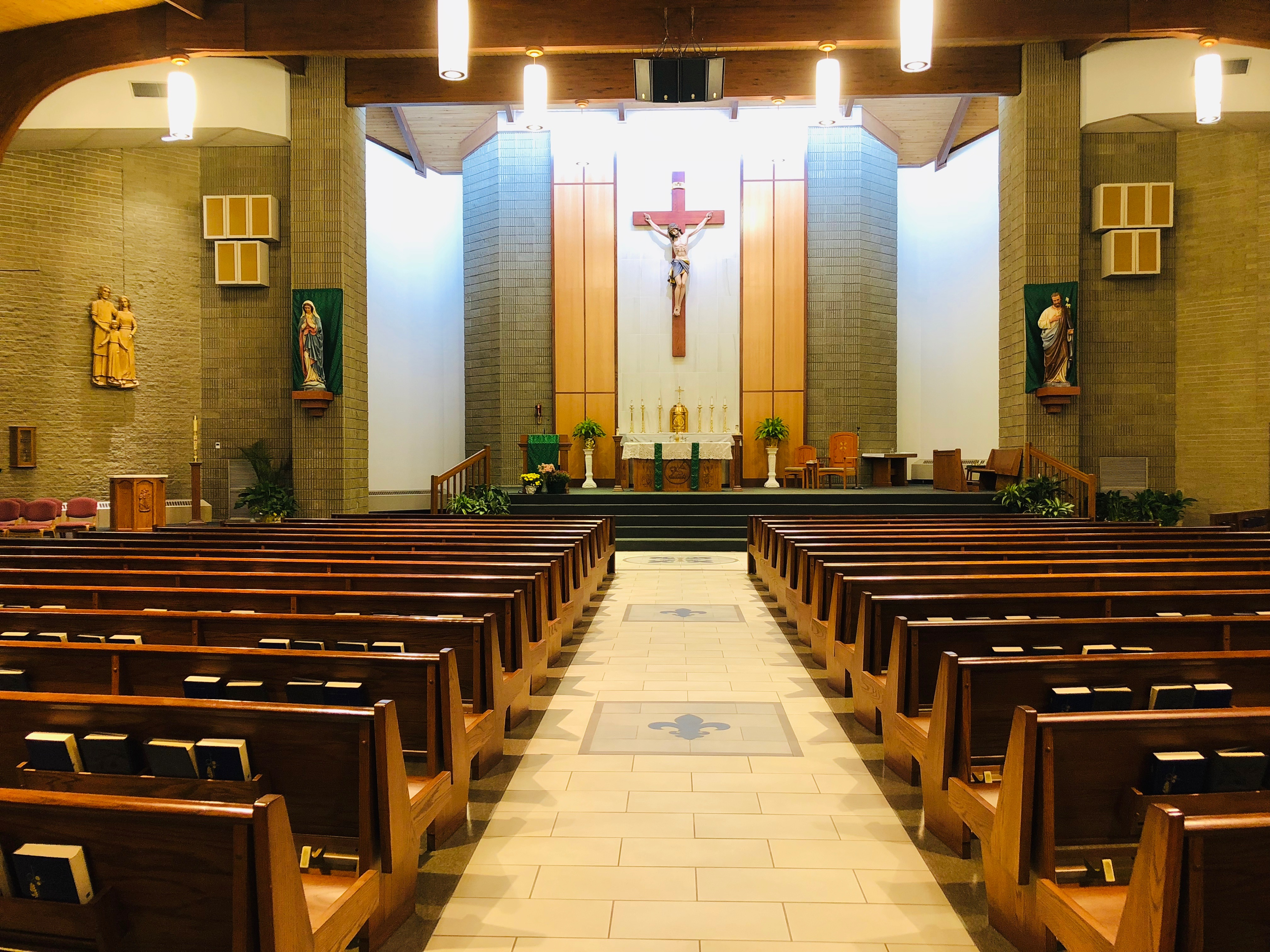
Interior of Our Lady of Victory Church

== Athletics ==
Our Lady of Victory's sports include football, soccer, baseball, softball, basketball, volleyball, and golf. Victory has five baseball fields, a football field, and a soccer field. It also has two basketball/volleyball gyms. One of the gyms is part of a multi-purpose building called the Convocation Center. The other is a sport-specific gym known as the "Tin Can". Team colors are navy blue, light blue, and gold.

== Festival ==
Victory's main fundraiser is the parish festival usually in mid-May. The festival includes rides, raffles, poker, a Sunday chicken dinner, booths, games of chance, performing bands, and food and drinks.

== Holy Smokes ==
In August 2016, OLV hosted the first annual Holy Smokes Barbecue Competition. The event is sanctioned by the Kansas City Barbecue Society.

== Notable alumni ==
- Bill Hemmer, anchor on Fox News Channel
- Jim Herman, professional golfer on the PGA Tour
- Kyle Rudolph, professional football player (went to Victory for grades 1–3)
- Tony Maas, chief executive officer of JTM Food Group.

== Name ==
Our Lady of Victory is named in honor of Mary. The story behind Our Lady of Victory is Pope Pius V told all of Europe to pray the Rosary for their army because they were heavily outnumbered by the Ottomans. Because they prayed for Mary's intercession, she helped them to win the battle over and stun the Ottomans. Since the battle was won, with help of Mary, she is called Our Lady of Victory.

== Recent principals ==
- Sally Hicks (2000–2006)
- Jim Leisring (2007)
- Kathy Kane (2008–2015)
- Amy Matthews (2015–present)
