= Patrick Osborne (animator) =

American animator and film director

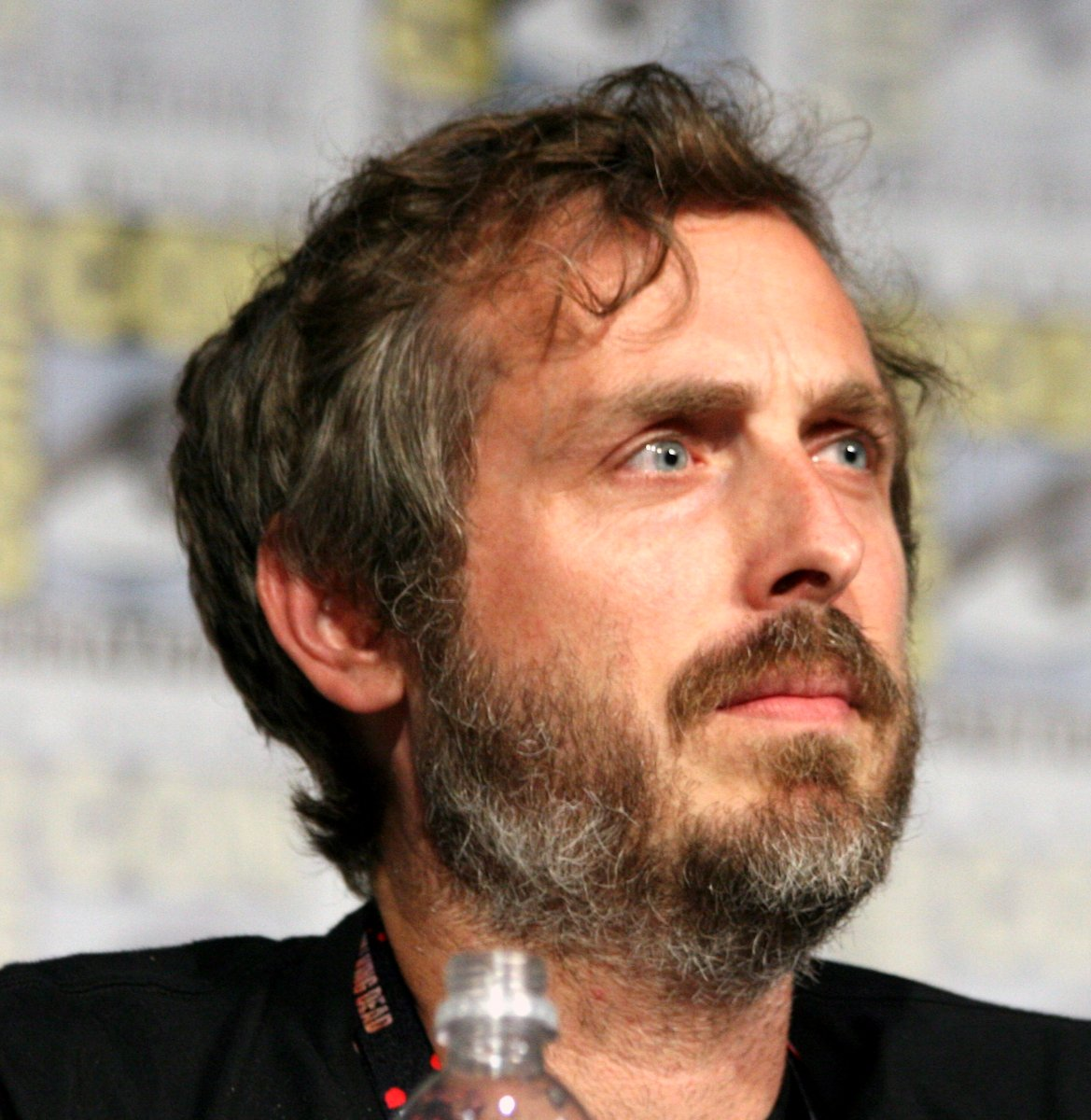
- Osborne at San Diego Comic-Con 2016
- Occupations: Animator, screenwriter and film director
- Years active: 2005–present

Patrick Osborne is an American animator, screenwriter and film director. He won the Academy Award for Best Animated Short Film for his 2014 film Feast.

== Early life and education ==
Osborne grew up in the Cincinnati suburb of Green Township, went to the Our Lady of the Visitation School for grade school, and graduated from St. Xavier High School in Cincinnati in 1999. He earned a degree in computer animation from the Ringling College of Art and Design in 2003.

== Career ==
Osborne's directorial debut was the short film Feast (2014), about a Boston Terrier who loves getting fed junk food. The short was produced by Walt Disney Animation Studios and premiered in front of Big Hero 6 (2014) in theaters. It won the Academy Award for Best Animated Short Film in 2015. Osborne had previously worked as an animator on films such as Wreck-It Ralph (2012) and Bolt (2008).

He directed Pearl for Google's Spotlight Stories, a short film about the relationship between a father and his daughter. The film is set entirely in a car and shows the decay of the car and the structure of the film reflects the song which plays throughout it. It uses cuts, which were previously unexplored, and over forty sets, which is more than any other of the Google Spotlight shorts. For his work on the film, Osborne was again nominated for the Academy Award for Best Animated Short Film in 2017.

Osborne has been selected by Paramount Pictures and Weed Road to direct a film version of the video game Monument Valley, originally developed by Ustwo in 2015.

In July 2022, it was announced that Osborne would write and direct an adaptation of The Goon for Netflix.

== Filmography ==
- Feast (2014) – writer, director (short film)
- Pearl (2016) – director (short film)
- Imaginary Mary (2017) – co-creator, executive producer, animation director (TV series)
- Drawn Closer (2021) – co-writer, director (short film)
- Happier Than Ever: A Love Letter to Los Angeles (2021) – co-director (concert film with animated sequences)
- Love, Death & Robots (2022–25) (TV series) 3 episodes
- Nimona (2023) – co-producer
- Secret Level (2024) (TV series) Episode: "Concord: Tale of the Implacable"
