= Western Hills Airport =

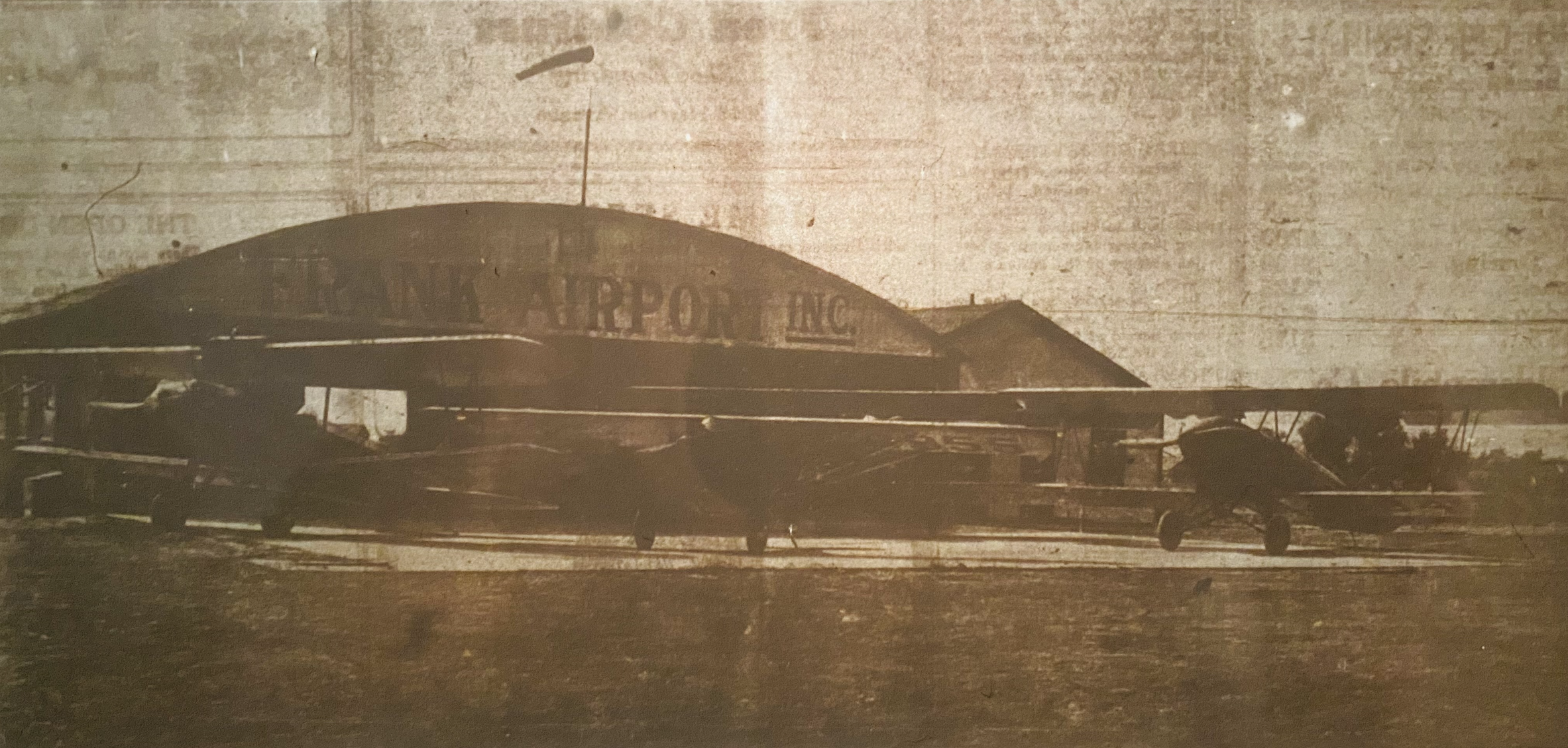
- Western Hills Airport
- IATA: none; ICAO: none

Summary
- Location: Western Hills, Ohio
- Opened: 10 August 1929
- Coordinates: 39.1556°N 84.6441°W

Map
- Location within Ohio Location within the United States

Western Hills Airport (also known as Frank Airport and Cheviot Airport) was the first airport in western Hamilton County, Ohio. It was located in Bridgetown, and airport operations began in 1929. The airport shut down during World War II, but reopened later. It slowly went into decline, ceasing service in 1949 as aircraft outgrew the facility.

== History ==
=== Background ===
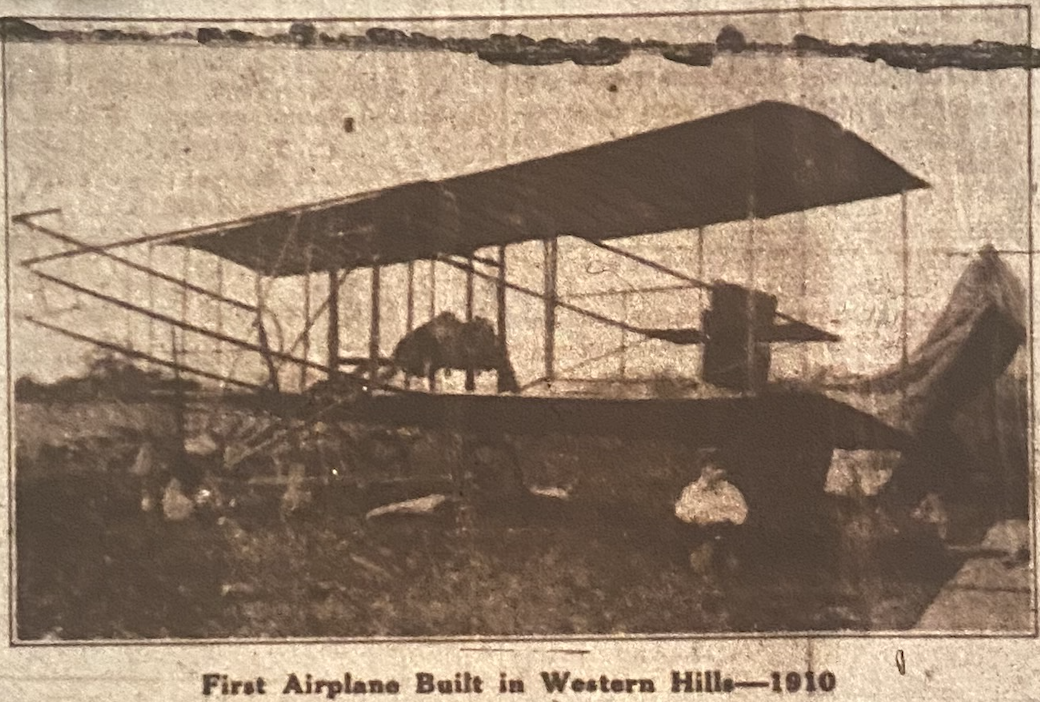
The first airplane built in Western Hills, 1910

In 1788, John Cleves Symmes purchased the land now known as the greater Cincinnati area. In 1790, Hamilton County was incorporated. Until 1795, when the Treaty of Greenville was signed, the Native American Shawnee lived in the area. In 1809, settlers established Green Township. The land, largely used for hunting and trapping, was heavily wooded. During the 1820s, the land began to be cleared and cultivated. The site of Western Hamilton County's first airport was owned by Francis Frondorf and Elizabeth A. Groves; It was later owned by Judge George F. Eyrich, Jr. and his wife, Ida R. Eyrich. In 1926, the land was subdivided and roads dedicated for public use. It was known as the Cheviot Heights Subdivision.

"Aviation fever" was sweeping the country and Cincinnati's first airport, Lunken Airport, opened in eastern Hamilton County in 1925. The western part of the county felt the need for an airport in rural Bridgetown.

=== Frank Airport (1928–1930) ===
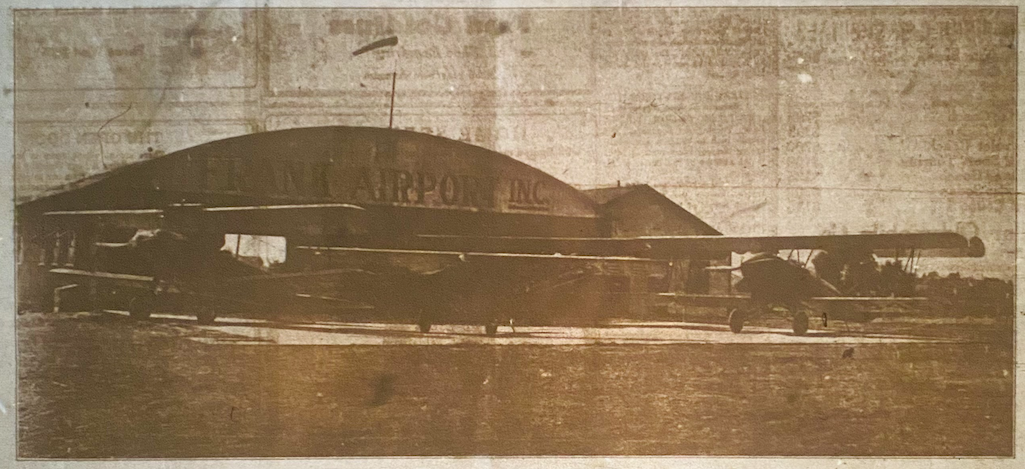
Grand opening of Frank Airport

On November 8, 1928, about 50 acres (20 ha) of the Cheviot Heights Subdivision was purchased by Earl Stanley Simmonds and Harry A. Frank. The airport, with a planned name of Western Hills Airport, would be western Hamilton County's first. The purchase was facilitated by the Western Hills Realty Company, and two of its employees (F. O. Rack and L. J. Mueller) were instrumental in bringing an airport to the area. The land, recently cleared for suburban homes, needed little preparation before planes could use the grass fields.

The land was seen as good for an airport because it was elevated and free from fog and flooding, unlike Lunken Airport. Bids were accepted from local businesses for building hangars and maintenance facilities to house the approximately 50 private airplanes owned and operated in the greater Cincinnati area. Local leaders planned to land postal airplanes on the roof of the Union Terminal building, but abandoned the idea due to lack of space. This led local developers to consider other locations near rail stations to aid in the transport of mail across the county. It was hoped that Western Hills Airport would be a U.S. mail station, but this never happened.

Simmonds' brother, attorney R. E. Simmonds, formed Frank Airport, Inc. on April 4, 1929, to run the airport. Harry A. Frank, who studied airplane-motor construction, service, and repair, was the corporation's initial administrator. Its officers hoped that the airport would become a Midwestern hub for motor service. Frank, a mechanical instructor in the United States Army Signal Corps for two years, was a mechanical and electrical engineer for four years and led a local company for seven years before the airport opened.

Aerial photograph of Bridgetown in April 1948, with Cheviot Airport in the lower center

The airport was in Green Township, in the neighborhood now known as Bridgetown, and its hangar was near present-day 3615 Neiheisel Avenue. The northeast runway ran from near present-day 3658 Eyrich Road south to 3501 Eyrich Road. The east-west runway extended from near the backyard of 3588 Krierview Drive east to the front yard of present-day 3594 Lakewood Drive. The runways crossed near present-day 3594 Eyrich Road. (Note: The approximate location described can be viewed via Google Maps.)

Thousands of people were predicted to flock to the airport, and excitement was high. Work on hangars was planned to begin in late December 1928; the airport was planned to open in February 1929, but construction was repeatedly delayed.

In March 1929, planes began flying at the airport and a hangar was being built. News coverage in the Western Hills Press was enthusiastic, with plans for the construction of aeronautical-school buildings, office buildings and maintenance facilities. Actual dates, however, were vague.

The metal hangar was finished in May 1929, and the company's two planes were moved to the field from storage at Watson Airport. In May, the Cincinnati Glider Club (a branch of the Cincinnati Aviation Units) began flying at the airport. Carl Hageman of 2978 Wardall Avenue was reportedly the first pilot to make a glider flight at the airport. The club, a national pioneer of gliding, was the seventh in the country to receive a charter from the National Glider Association and the second in Ohio. The glider program became one of the airport's busiest in its early years, and the group formed glider clubs in Middletown and Hamilton in 1929.

The airport began to advertise, hoping to capitalize on the area's aviation excitement. In its early days, the airport was called Frank Airport and Western Hills Airport. Its opening was scheduled for May, June, and August, and it opened on August 10, 1929. The Sohio Air Pullman plane was on display. The airplane, a red, white, and blue six-seat monoplane similar to Charles Lindbergh's Spirit of St. Louis, had a larger engine and was used by Standard Oil of Ohio to promote the company in particular and aviation in general; it became a frequent visitor to the airport. Prominent community members were invited to take flights. Local businessman L. J. Mueller was the master of ceremonies. An official from the Ohio State Department of Aeronautics addressed the crowd; visitors watched an aerobatics demonstration and were invited to tour the facilities. Lafayette Escadrille member and aviation instructor Robert Rockwell made a speech. Frank Manson, parachute supervisor at Wright Field in Dayton, Ohio, instructed student aviator William Fowler in a parachute jump the following day.

It was reported in the Western Hills Press the following week that "thousands" attended the airport's grand opening, and more than 200 airplane rides were given over the weekend. An additional plane from Dixie Davis Airport was brought in to accommodate crowds hoping for a ride. When it opened, the airport's officers were:

- Harry A. Frank, president and general manager
- Abbot A. Thayer (an engineering graduate of Harvard University), vice president and sales manager
- George H. Schone, secretary
- Virgie Frank, treasurer

Members of its board of directors were:

- Earl S. Simmonds
- G. Mattman
- Frederick H. Hagemann

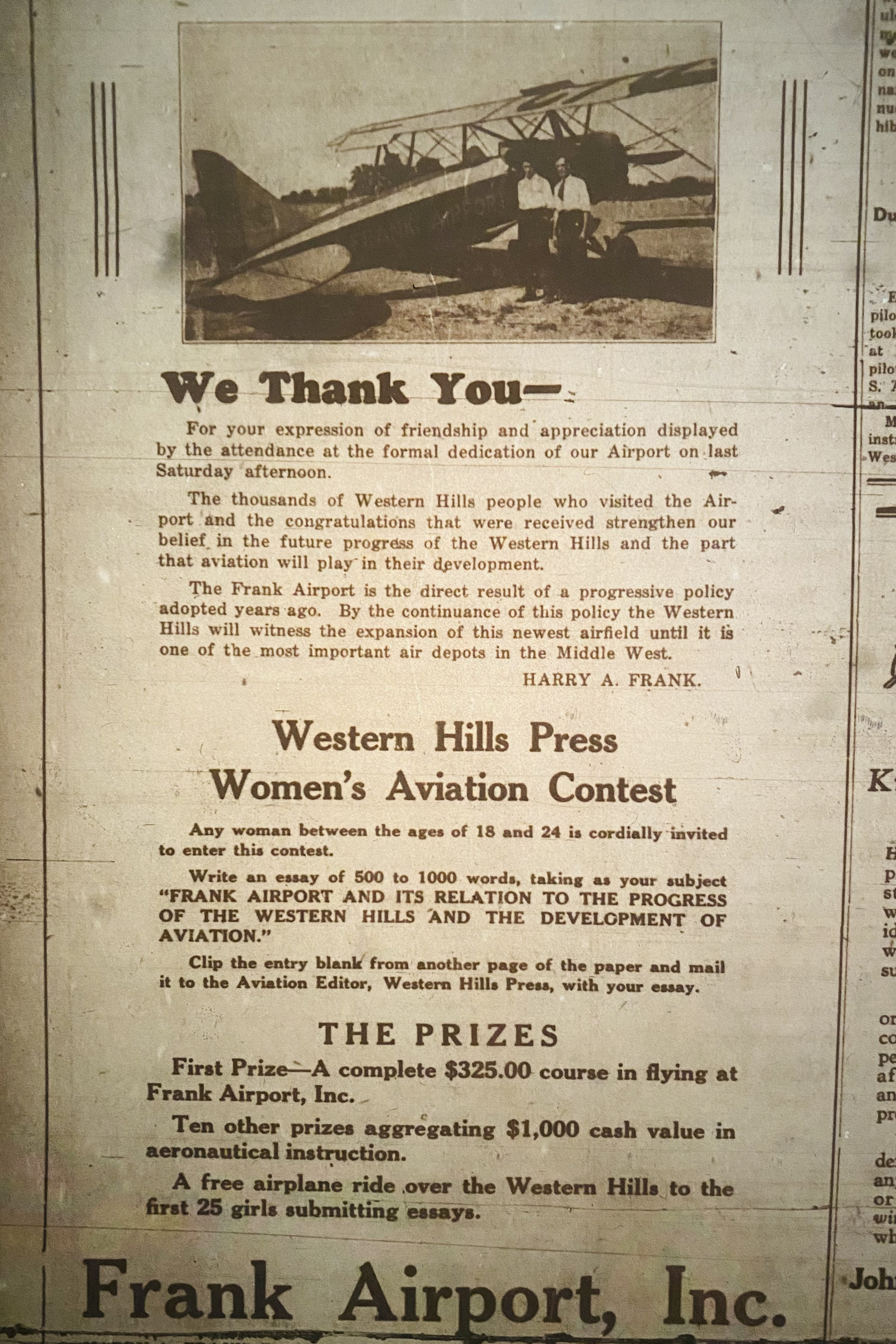
Western Hills Press advertisement for Frank Airport

During the airport's early months, a "Women's Aviation Contest" invited women between the ages of 18 and 24 were to write a 500–1000 word essay about Frank Airport and its relationship to aviation development. The winner would win a $325 flying course at the airport. Ten other prizes, totaling $1,000, would be divided as aeronautical instruction. The first 25 women to submit essays would receive a "free airplane ride over the Western Hills". The essay judges were:

- Dorothy Goodwin, aviation editor of the Cincinnati Times-Star
- Mrs. L. J. Mueller, president of the Westwood Parent and Teachers' Association and member of the Westwood Women's Club
- Judge George F. Eyrich, Jr., president of the Westwood Civic Association and former owner of the land the airport was located upon
- Walter Lay, president of the Western Hills Business Association
- Judge Alfred K. Nippert, chairman of the Western Hills Viaduct Association

The contest ran from August 16–31, 1929, and announcement of the winners was scheduled for September 7. Virgie Frank, wife of Harry A. Frank and airport treasurer, volunteered for the first class to learn to fly with the contest winners.

When the airport opened, it had three modern buildings: A 100-by-60-foot (30 by 18 m) metal hangar, an adjoining 60-by-30-foot (18 by 9 m) office building and machine shop, and a restaurant that touted as having the "most modern cooking equipment". The machine shop was marketed as a repair and painting facility for automobiles and airplanes. With tools and machines to rebuild and repair mechanical and electrical parts of cars and planes, it also had spraying, rubbing, and polishing machines for servicing and refinishing vehicle surfaces. The airport's phone number was Harrison 3005, and the community was urged to call "day or night".

Airplane rides began at $2.00 and encouraged local residents to "see the Western Hills from the air"; "You will never appreciate the full beauty of the Western Hills until you have viewed them from the air". Another ad read, "Be modern and air-minded".

Frank Airport now owned three airplanes: two Internationals built in Cincinnati and one Travelair built in Wichita, Kansas. Each was powered by Curtiss motors.

On August 16, 1929, former Mt. Healthy Airport chief pilot E. F. Skockdopole became the new chief pilot at Frank Airport. Skockdopole, a graduate of the University of Minnesota, "served in the Army Signal Corps, patrolled the Mexican border for smugglers, owned his own air circus, and was instrumental in establishing the St. Louis-Chicago mail route of Lindbergh fame". Pilot Thomas Cushman, who had been doing most of the flying at Frank Airport, worked with Skockdopole.

==== Dangers of flight ====
In those early days, flying was a dangerous sport. During the airport's first few months of operation, there were at least three crashes with no reported injuries.

On May 30, 1929, an International plane with a pilot and two passengers clipped high-tension lines near the airport when taking off. The pilot said that they hit an air pocket, struck the wires, and crashed into a nearby wheat field. The crash broke the plane's propeller and landing gear.

On October 14, 1929, 21-year-old pilot instructor Thomas Cushman and 20-year-old student George Waltz flew into a radio antenna and crashed. Waltz had a badly-bruised nose, but Cushman reportedly was uninjured. The crash, which occurred two blocks from Waltz's home, destroyed the plane. On March 1, 1930, George H. Liebel made a weather-related forced landing in a cornfield near Shandon.

Deputy sheriffs reported that pilot Thomas Cushman and student pilot John Hunt took off from Frank Airport before their plane crashed into the Big Miami River. A correction was published on May 28, 1930, saying that the plane originated from West Cincinnati Airport.

==== Receivership ====
Earl S. Simmonds, owner of the airport land who was leasing it to Frank Airport, filed a suit in Common Pleas Court on June 20, 1930, requesting the appointment of a receiver for the airport. Simmonds cancelled the lease, saying that the $100 monthly lease had not been paid since March 1, 1929, and Frank Airport owed him $1,900 in rent and $1,290.40 for taxes and other expenses.

It was also stated that the company borrowed $2,000 from the Western Bank & Trust Company (co-signed by Simmonds), and the loan was past due. Simmonds said that the company was losing about $600 per month through the first half of 1930. Attorney John W. Cowell was appointed as receiver by Judge Dennis J. Ryan.

=== Western Hills Airport (1930–1944) ===
The airport continued operations as Western Hills Airport under Mel Wood. It began hosting weekly activities in 1930, including aerial stunt maneuvers, parachute jumping, mystery races, and a bomb-dropping contest. The airport also hosted hangar dances with orchestral music. The Albatross Birdmen Glider Club was active until its fall 1936 move to the larger Watson Airport. The club flew gliders with and without motors, and director Melvin O. Wood instructed students in glider flight.

The airport worked to attract women to sport flying, and a number of articles and advertisements in The Cincinnati Enquirer and The Western Hills Press invited women to take lessons at the airport. It also tried to make a name for itself as a regional repair hub. Fred Jolly, a licensed aeronautical engineer, engine mechanic and pilot, led the work at this time. Jolly, the former the chief engineer for States Aircraft Corporation in Chicago and the Aircraft Corporation of America in Indianapolis, also managed airfields in Illinois and New York. The flight program at this time was managed by John P. Sutherland, who taught students at a number of schools, had a range of barnstorming experience, and was a test pilot for Cloud Aircraft Corporation before coming to Western Hills Airport.

Former pilots talked about "6974", a red 1928 Waco 10 airplane owned by pilot Howard Geiger which ferried people and supplies during the Ohio River flood of 1937 and had about 1300 hours of flight time before Geiger sold it to John Hatz on December 7, 1941. The airplane, currently owned by George M. Jenkins, is at the Eagles Mere Air Museum in Laporte, Pennsylvania.

There were several tragedies at the airport during this time. In June 1933, a gasoline stove exploded and burned Jolly; he was off work under a physician's care for nearly a month. A two-passenger Moncoupe crashed on July 14, 1940, killing 27-year-old pilot Charles Rentz and 18-year-old passenger Walter Ludwig on impact. The plane was reportedly returning from Maysville, Kentucky where the two pilots were visiting a fellow pilot. They took off from Western Hills Airport at about 3 pm that afternoon, flew to Maysville, and were returning at about 8 pm. Rentz was making a final turn to land when the plane went into a spin at about 500 feet and crashed in flames about 700 feet (210 m) from the field hangar; it was reportedly enveloped in flames in less than two minutes. Witnesses called the Cheviot Fire Department, but the bodies were burned beyond recognition. Firefighters had to saw through the plane's metal frame to retrieve the victims. About 30 people at the airport saw the crash, and hundreds of spectators flocked to the field. The crowd was reportedly so large that two aircraft were circling, unable to land. Airport staff cleared the field in about 15 minutes so the planes could land. Rentz, a 1932 graduate of Automotive High School's aviation division, had over 800 hours in the air. The federal Air Safety Board (precursor of the FAA) determined that the plane had not been certified by the board, and Rentz was only permitted to fly solo. A parachute training school was started by Carl Noelcke, the General Manager of the Triangle Parachute Company, at the airport in May 1940. Western Hills Airport was briefly considered as a site for an auxiliary airfield (the future CVG) for Lunken Airport in August 1941, but was considered too small for future growth.

On December 7, 1941, the Japanese bombed Pearl Harbor. The U.S. and Britain declared war on Japan the following day, beginning U.S. involvement in World War II. Shortly after the U.S. entered the war, many pilots and men were called to fight; fuel and supplies were prohibited, to support the war effort. Western Hills Airport went mostly quiet, and the Albatross Glider Club disbanded. The glider was sold to Ohio State University, and the government reportedly commandeered gliders at this time.

With Western Hills Airport largely unused at this time and many of its pilots off at war, the executive committee of Miami University's building committee authorized the purchase of the airport's metal hangar for $3,000 on October 18, 1942. In January 1943, the hangar was disassembled and reassembled at Miami University Airport in Oxford for pilot training. A "notch" was cut out of the hangar to accommodate the larger planes used at that time. The Miami University Airport hangar was updated and dedicated to Robert C. "Bob" Younts on November 3, 2012.

=== Cheviot Airport (1945–1949) ===
As World War II ended, 27-year-old Al Weinberg (who learned to fly at the airport in 1935) reopened the airport on August 12, 1945, and leased the property from E. S. Simmonds. Cheviot Mayor Edward C. Gingerich took the first flight over the city. The airport opened as Cheviot Airport. Weinberg was a flight instructor in the U.S. Army Air Corps for four years, and was honorably discharged in October 1944. He taught glider flying at a number of locations, and taught cadets for a year at Lunken Airport in Cincinnati. Weinberg planned to devote the airport to commercial services, including flight training, city-to-city charter flights, aircraft maintenance, and hangar rental. He reopened the airport with three airplanes for training: one Piper Cub and two Taylorcraft planes. Although the original metal hangar had been removed and moved to the Miami University Airport in 1943, Weinberg added several tee hangars for rental to private-plane owners. Construction of the hangars was slow due to postwar supply-chain problems. The north-south and east-west runways, both about 1,700 feet (520 m) long, were planned to be lengthened to 2,250 feet (690 m) to accommodate the larger airplanes built at the time.

A January 1946 fire believed to be started by an overheated stove tore through the airport's frame office building, destroying many records. Firefighters prevented the three planes stored near the office from being damaged.

In March 1946, The Cincinnati Enquirer published an article entitled, "Master Plan Depicts Cincinnati as Center of Air Traffic". A map depicted 21 airports (including Cheviot) planned to support the city as a regional aviation hub. The plan, prepared by Cincinnati's Master Planning Division, was requested by the Civil Aeronautics Administration. The largest airfields at the time were Cincinnati Airport in Boone County (the future Greater Cincinnati/Northern Kentucky International Airport) and Lunken Airport. The article noted that 36,485 air passengers were handled by Lunken Airport in 1940, and the plan projected an increase to 500,000 by 1956. The study was required by the CAA to qualify for federal funding for the construction of a planned "master airport" in Blue Ash. The city began courting major passenger airlines, and hoped to attract air cargo and freight traffic as well. In June 1946, three airlines – Delta, American, and Trans World – announced that they would leave Lunken Airport for the Boone County Airport under a five-year contract. During the summer of 1946, Cincinnati and northern Kentucky debated about whether the master airport would be in Ohio (Blue Ash) or Kentucky (Boone County). The CAA approved the city's master plan on August 17, 1946, granting permission for development of the Blue Ash master airport but not committing to fund the project. It recommended that Blue Ash Airport construction be delayed until the new Boone County Airport could no longer accommodate existing air traffic.

Advertisements were still appearing in local papers for purchasing airplanes and learning how to fly at the airport in June 1946, but airport activity had notably decreased. As rural land was slowly replaced by suburban homes, local residents complained about low-flying planes in the area. Articles in local papers in 1946 and 1947 decried airplanes buzzing the roofs of homes on Bridgetown Road, Eyrich Avenue and Race Road and destroying "Sabbath calm in Bridgetown". Blame was often placed on student pilots, who were cautioned by the airport's owners to take a different course

On October 27, 1946, Boone County Airport (now officially Greater Cincinnati Airport) opened. The $4 million project was the region's primary passenger airport. Flying at Cheviot Airport had virtually ended by the end of 1947, although newspaper articles referred to the airport when describing the location of fires or new houses for sale.

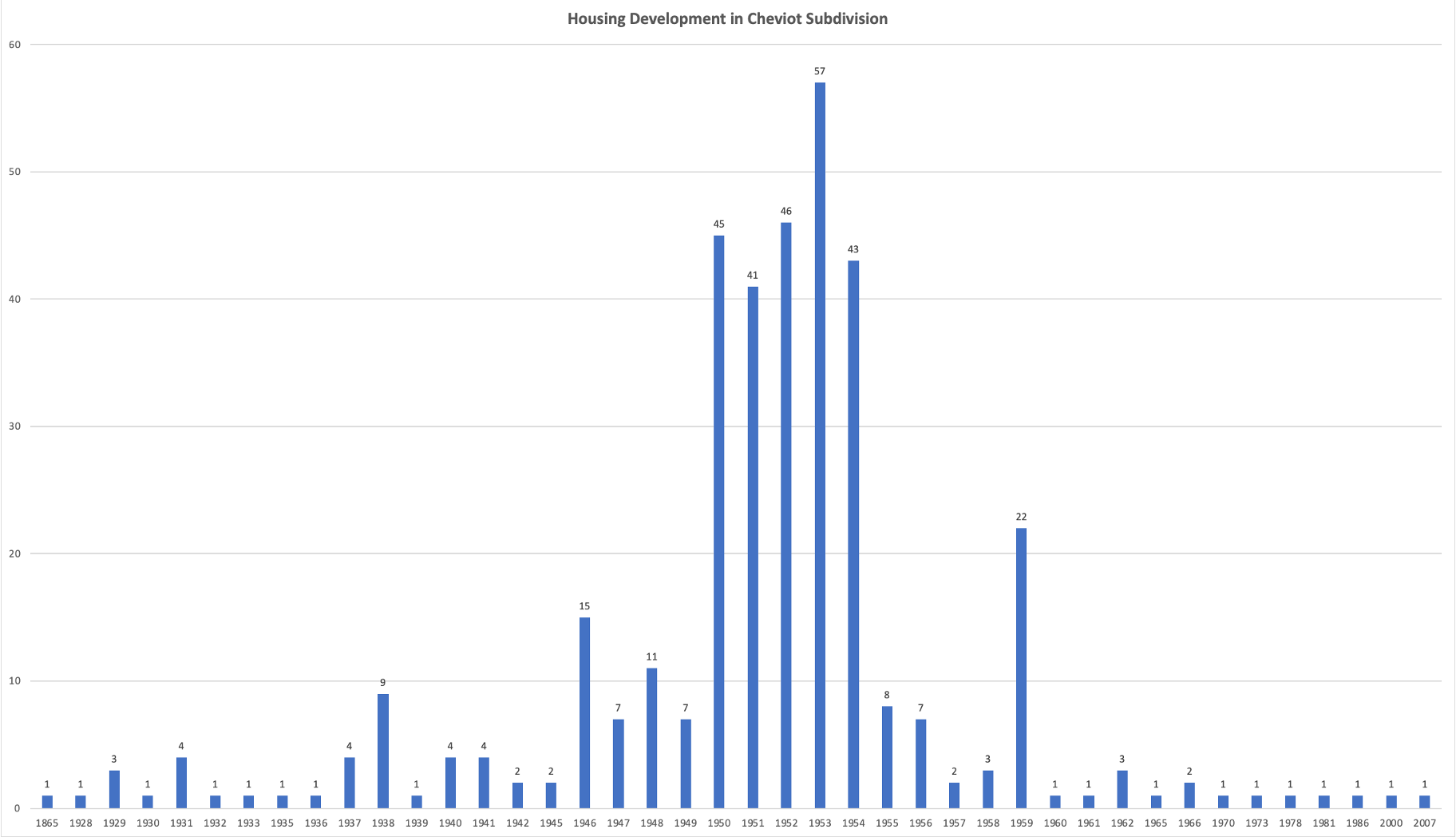
Housing-development graph, from the Hamilton County Auditor's website

On March 29, 1950, E. S. Simmonds sold the 50 acres (20 ha) to the Albert T. Childs Construction Company. It was noted on September 7, 1950, and September 29, 1953, that R. E. Simmonds, Jr. sold additional land to Brune-Harpenau Builders, Hildreth M. Childs and Albert T. Childs, Jr. R. E. Simmonds, Jr. conveyed the land with a deed restriction that it was to be "sold to, leased to, or occupied by persons only of the Caucasian or White Race". In 1948 (Shelley v. Kraemer), the U.S. Supreme Court held that racially-restrictive covenants were unconstitutional and violated the equal-protection provision of the Fourteenth Amendment. Not an uncommon practice at the time, deed restrictions were a common method used by developers and white residents for maintaining segregated residential neighborhoods. Housing advertisements in The Cincinnati Enquirer as late as 1965 indicated where Black people could live and where they could not; houses would be listed for sale as houses for "Coloreds". The deed restriction imposed by R. E. Simmonds, Jr. would segregate Bridgetown for decades to come.

Although houses were slowly built on land surrounding the airport throughout the late 1940s (about 40 from 1945 to 1949), most houses (over 230) were built between 1950 and 1954. By the mid-1950s, the rolling hills and any remnants of the old airport were covered by rows of suburban homes.

== Timeline ==
=== Pre-airport era ===
- 1788 – John Cleves Symmes purchases land
- 1847 – Land owned by D. Richardson and others
- 1869-1884 – Land owned by Francis Frondorf and Elizabeth A. Groves
- 1925 – Lunken Airport opens
- February 27 and March 9, 1926 – George F. Eyrich, Jr. and Ida (Reinhart) Eyrich adopt the plat of subdivision and dedicate its roads to public use

=== Frank Airport ===
- November 9, 1928 – About 50 acres (20 ha) purchased by E. S. Simmonds and Harry A. Frank, originally planned to be called Western Hills Airport
- December 1, 1928 – Earl S. Simmonds signs a three-year lease for land in the Cheviot Heights subdivision with Frank Airport for an annual rent of $1,200
- March 24, 1929 – Work progresses on the airport, and planes began flying
- April 4, 1929 – Incorporation paperwork filed with the Ohio Secretary of State for Frank Airport, with $60,000 invested by R. E. Simmonds Jr., Frank J. Richter, and William S. Schwartz
- May 3, 1929 – Hangar completed, and Cincinnati Glider Club begins using airfield
- May 5, 1929 – Cincinnati Glider Club is piloted by John Moinichen
- May 26, 1929 – The club, piloted by William Fowler, makes a record glider flight
- May 30, 1929 – Plane clips high-tension wires near the airport and crashes
- June 23 and July 21, 1929 – More successful glider flights
- August 2, 1929 – Airport opening postponed to August 10
- August 4, 1929 – More successful glider flights
- August 9, 1929 – Program set for airport opening
- August 10, 1929 – Airport opens; pilot set to fly in contest
- August 16, 1929 – Women encouraged to fly
- August 17, 1929 – Frank Airport sued by the International Aircraft Company for $657.92
- August 18, 1929 – Glider contest
- August 23, 1929 – Pilots compete nationally
- September 8, 1929 – The six-passenger Sohioan Standard Oil Air Pullman visits the airport
- September 15, 1929 – John G. Hunt solos
- September 21, 1929 – Cincinnati Women's Glider Club formed
- September 22, 1929 – Cincinnati Women's Glider Club begins lessons
- September 23, 1929 – More glider records
- September 27, 1929 – Model Airplane and Practical Aviation Club initiative by the YMCA and Frank Airport is announced
- October 14, 1929 – Plane crashes; no injuries
- January 5, 1930 – Cincinnati Aviation Unit has flying headquarters at Frank Airport
- March 1, 1930 – Plane forced down

=== Western Hills Airport ===
- June 20, 1930 – Frank Airport in receivership of John Cowell and operated by Mel Wood
- 1932 – Aerial photograph of Western Hills Airport and surrounding area
- January 16, 1932 – Western Hills Viaduct opens
- May 28, 1933 – Aviation attractions publicized
- June 4, 1933 – Airport dog fights, [sic] stunts, parachuting, and a hangar dance with orchestral music
- July, 1933 – Stove explodes, burning pilot Fred Jolly
- April 14, 1935 – Women considered best student
- August 16, 1936 – Albatross Birdman glider club installs motor plane
- September 20, 1936 – Birdmen Glider Club moves to Watson Airport
- July 14, 1940 – Pilot and passenger killed in crash
- August 26, 1940 – Officers elected for Cincinnati Parachute Club, which jumps on Sundays
- August 26, 1941 – Airport briefly considered by Civil Aeronautics Authority as site for auxiliary Lunken Airport airfield
- Early 1941 – Airport closes shortly before the outbreak of World War II
- October 18, 1942 – Executive Committee of Miami University Building Committee purchases hangar
- January 5, 1943 – Planes move from Lunken due to flooding
- Early 1943 – Hangar disassembled and moved to Miami University Airport

=== Cheviot Airport ===
- August 12, 1945 – Cheviot Airport reopens after the war, operated by 27-year-old former Army flying instructor Albert O. Weinberg. The resumption of charter flights, student instruction, a new hangar, lengthening N/S and E/W runways and an additional diagonal runway are planned.
- December 10, 1945 – A low-flying plane buzzes a chimney.
- December 16, 1945 – Piper Cub Sport for sale.
- January 22, 1946 – A fire damages the office building, destroying many records.
- March 28, 1946 – Master plan with Cincinnati as air-traffic hub
- May 26, 1946 – Piper Cub for sale.
- July 14, 1946 – Low flying reported on 5857 Bridgetown Road.
- July 24, 1946 – Introductory flight lessons in a Piper Cub for $2 at Cheviot Airport.
- October 27, 1946 – Cincinnati Airport opens.
- May 26, 1947 – Brick homes for sale in Bridgetown, next to Cheviot Airport
- October 20, 1947 – Plane buzzes houses.

=== Subdivision development ===
- March 24, 1950 – "A seven-acre blaze at old Cheviot Airport"
- March 29, 1950 – 50 acres sold by Simmonds to Albert T. Childs Construction.
- September 7, 1950 – R. E. Simmonds, Jr. sold to Brune-Harpenau Builders, Hildreth M. Childs and Albert T. Childs, Jr. with the conveyance subject to being "sold to, leased to or occupied by persons only of the Caucasian or White Race".
- September 29, 1953 – R. E. Simmonds, Jr. sold to Brune-Harpenau Builders, Hildreth M. Childs and Albert T. Childs, Jr. with the same restriction.

=== Later reports ===
- April 12, 1978 – Members of the Albatross Glider Club included Arthur Bidlingmeyer (Mack), Carl Hagemann, and Clifford Knosp (Delhi).
- November 1990 pilot reunion
- 1997 – "Memories of Brick and Steel": "Powell's father, a flying enthusiast, painted an arrow on top of the building pointing to the Cheviot Airport. Since there were no natural markers to direct pilots in the direction of Cheviot's airport, they used Powell's arrow to point themselves in the right direction. 'You knew if you lined yourself up with the arrow it would take you right into the airport."
