= Bridgetown, Ohio =

- Census-designated place
- Location in Hamilton County and the state of Ohio.
- Coordinates: 39°09′24″N 84°37′48″W
- Country: United States
- State: Ohio
- County: Hamilton

Area
  - Total: 4.31 sq mi (11.17 km^{2})
  - Land: 4.31 sq mi (11.17 km^{2})
  - Water: 0 sq mi (0.00 km^{2})
- Elevation: 899 ft (274 m)

Population (2020)
  - Total: 14,731
  - Density: 3,416.6/sq mi (1,319.15/km^{2})
- Time zone: UTC-5 (Eastern (EST))
  - Summer (DST): UTC-4 (EDT)
- FIPS code: 39-08602
- GNIS feature ID: 2585502

Bridgetown is a census-designated place (CDP) in Green Township, Hamilton County, Ohio, United States. The population was 14,731 at the 2020 census. In earlier censuses it was listed as the slightly smaller Bridgetown North CDP.

== History ==
Bridgetown was settled c. 1820, and named after Bridgeton, New Jersey, the native home of a share of the first settlers.

Bridgetown was home to the Western Hills Airport (Also called "Frank Airport" and "Cheviot Airport") and was the first airport in western Hamilton County, Ohio. Airport operations began in 1929, shutdown during World War II, then reopened after the end of the war, slowly declining until the corporation ceased services in 1949 as aircraft outgrew the facilities.

== Geography ==
Bridgetown is located just west of the city of Cheviot and 9 miles (14 km) northwest of downtown Cincinnati. Ohio State Route 264, Bridgetown Road, runs through the center of the community.

According to the United States Census Bureau, the CDP has a total area of 4.3 square miles (11.2 km^{2}), all land.

== Demographics ==
Historical population
Census	Pop.	Note	%±
2020	14,731		—
U.S. Decennial Census

=== 2020 census ===
As of the 2020 census, Bridgetown had a population of 14,731, with a population density of 3,416.28 people per square mile (1,319.15/km^{2}). The median age was 38.9 years. 23.7% of residents were under the age of 18 and 19.3% of residents were 65 years of age or older. For every 100 females there were 92.3 males, and for every 100 females age 18 and over there were 87.8 males age 18 and over.

100.0% of residents lived in urban areas, while 0.0% lived in rural areas.

There were 5,988 households and 6,207 housing units, of which 3.5% were vacant. Of all households, 29.9% had children under the age of 18 living in them, 46.5% were married-couple households, 16.5% had a male householder with no spouse or partner present, and 29.6% had a female householder with no spouse or partner present. About 30.1% of all households were made up of individuals, and 15.7% had someone living alone who was 65 years of age or older. The average household size was 2.48, and the average family size was 3.11. The homeowner vacancy rate was 1.0% and the rental vacancy rate was 3.2%.

Racial composition as of the 2020 census
Race	Number	Percent
White	13,284	90.2%
Black or African American	429	2.9%
American Indian and Alaska Native	14	0.1%
Asian	132	0.9%
Native Hawaiian and Other Pacific Islander	2	0.0%
Some other race	116	0.8%
Two or more races	754	5.1%
Hispanic or Latino (of any race)	304	2.1%

=== Income and poverty ===
According to the U.S. Census American Community Survey, for the period 2016-2020 the estimated median annual income for a household in the CDP was $66,765, and the median income for a family was $75,449. About 7.6% of the population were living below the poverty line, including 12.8% of those under age 18 and 4.2% of those age 65 or over. About 64.6% of the population were employed, and 29.7% had a bachelor's degree or higher.

== Education ==
The community is within Oak Hills Local School District. Oakdale Elementary School, Bridgetown Middle School and Oak Hills High School are within Bridgetown. Catholic Middle Schools include St. Jude and St. Aloysius Gonzaga.
