= Covedale, Cincinnati =

Covedale
- Former village
- Location within the state of Ohio
- Coordinates: 39°7′34″N 84°37′41″W
- Country: United States
- State: Ohio
- County: Hamilton
- Time zone: UTC-5 (Eastern (EST))
  - Summer (DST): UTC-4 (EDT)

Covedale is a former village in Hamilton County, Ohio, United States. The main area of the village was annexed by the city of Cincinnati and is now a neighborhood of about 15,000 people in the western part of the city.

== History ==
Covedale was annexed by Cincinnati on June 4, 1930. Residents of the annexed territory unsuccessfully argued in Common Pleas Court that the annexation date was March 18, 1931. Upon annexation, the village disincorporated and its remaining area reverted to Green Township, with a small fragment going to Delhi Township.

== Geography ==
Covedale is located about 6 miles (9.7 km) west of downtown Cincinnati. It is primarily a residential neighborhood of tree lined streets with brick and Tudor-style homes. Commercial areas are mainly centered about Glenway Avenue.

The U.S. Census provides population and demographic data for the area that remains in the townships, Covedale (CDP).

== See also ==
- Covedale (CDP), Ohio
