= OXD =

OXD may refer to:

- Miami University Airport, the IATA code OXD
- Bedford OXD, a general service vehicle
