= Sebastian Rentz =

American winemaker (1799–1866)

- Born: January 20, 1799; Bad Saulgau
- Died: June 4, 1866 (aged 67); Cincinnati, Ohio
- Resting place: Old St. Joseph's Cemetery
- Citizenship: Kingdom of Württemberg, United States of America
- Occupations: Baker, winemaker
- Known for: Winemaking
- Spouse: Cecelia Zoller
- Children: 11

Sebastian Rentz (January 20, 1799 – June 4, 1866) was a German-American winemaker in Cincinnati, Ohio. Rentz was known for producing sparkling Catawba wine from grapes grown in his Ohio River Valley vineyard. He is also known for developing his own grape cultivar, the Rentz Seedling Grape. Rentz was a contemporary winemaker of Nicholas Longworth.

== Personal life ==
Sebastian Rentz was born on January 20, 1799, in Bad Saulgau, Kingdom of Württemberg. In his early life, he was a servant for a wealthy family and in 1825, he travelled with the family to the United States and settled in Cincinnati, Ohio. He married Cecelia Zoller in 1828. In Cincinnati, he first worked as a baker, before becoming a winemaker. Rentz had 11 children, six of whom survived him. In 1840, he built a 17-room house on Foley Road. A portrait of the house was later made by landscape painter Robert S. Duncanson.

Rentz was a founding member of Our Lady of Victory (Cincinnati) (then called St. Stephen's) parish in 1842. He died in Cincinnati, Ohio, on June 4, 1866, and was buried at Old St. Joseph's Cemetery. At the time of his death, he owned more than 100 acres in Delhi Township and his estate was valued at $250,000.

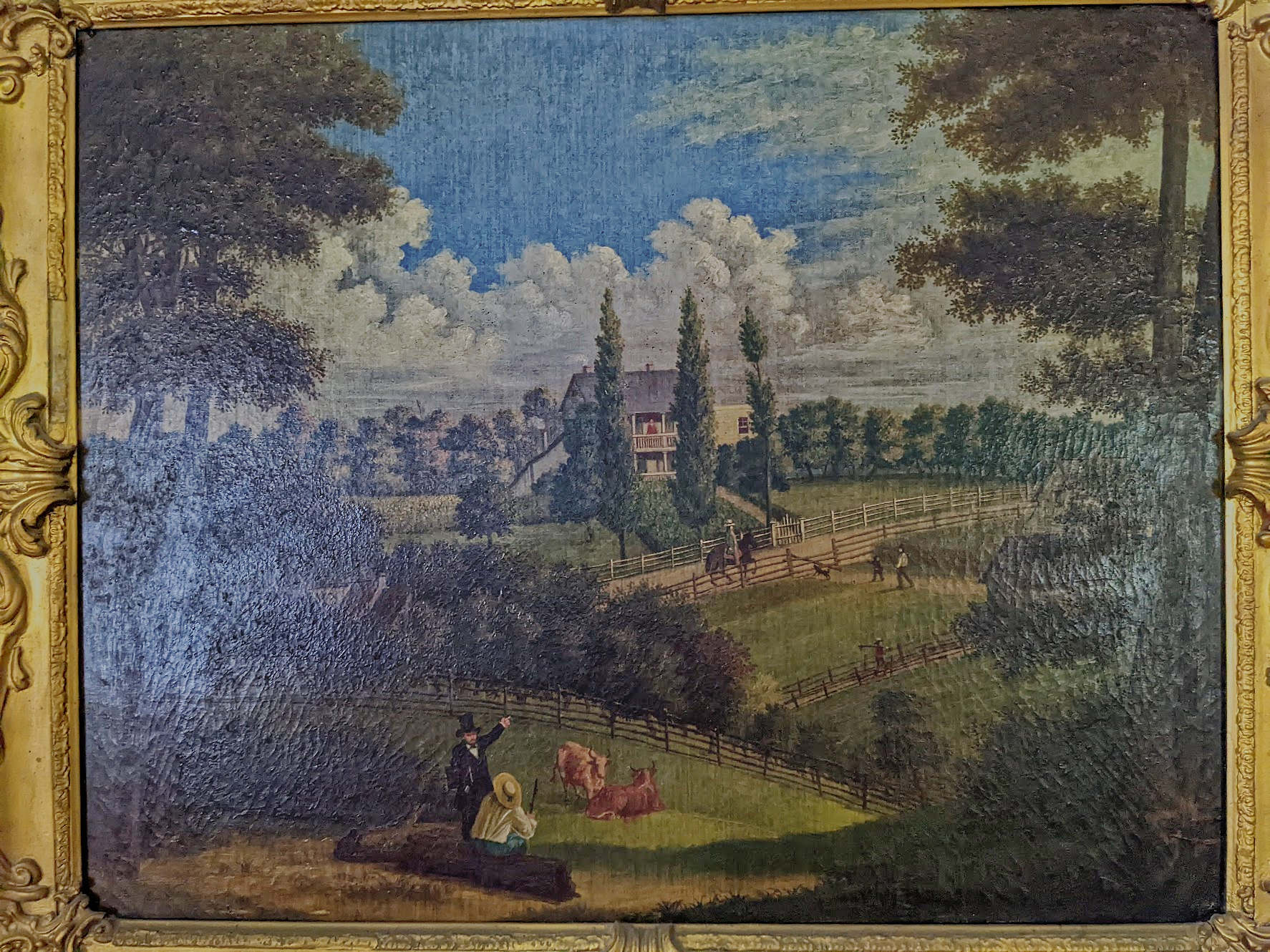
Landscape painting of Sebastian Rentz's house by Robert S. Duncanson from mid-1800s

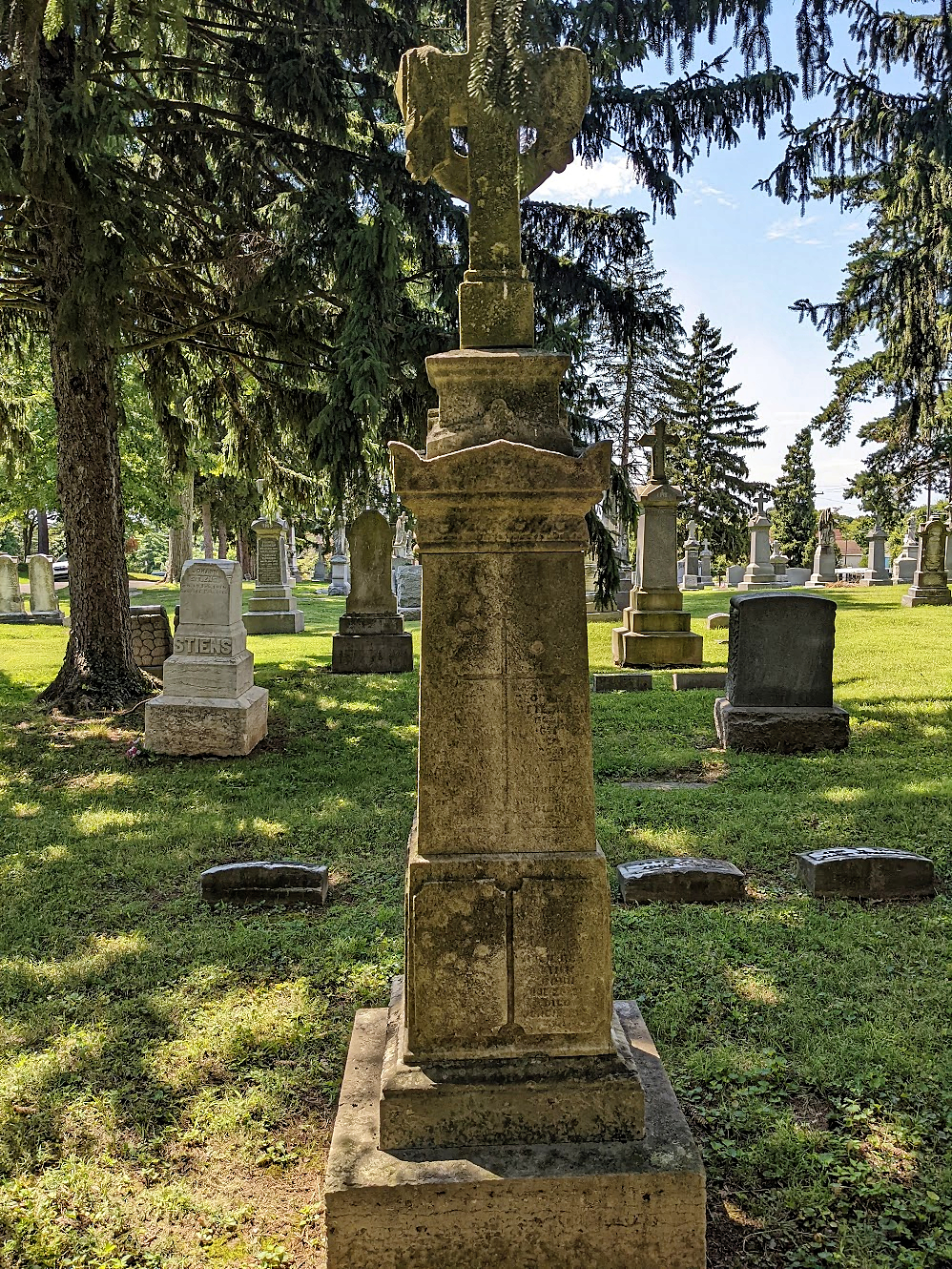
Tombstone for Sebastian Rentz

== Winemaking ==
In 1836, he purchased 40 acres of land in Delhi Township and started growing Catawba grapes and producing sparkling wine from them. By 1846, Rentz was the largest wine producer in Hamilton County, Ohio and produced a record 1,260 gallons of wine per acre. His wines won several awards including first place at the New York State Fair in 1851 and the Longworth cup in 1856.

In addition to growing Catawba grapes, Rentz developed his own grape cultivar, which became known as the Rentz Seedling Grape and was grown throughout the Ohio River Valley region. He also made improvements to the wine press that increased wine production efficiency.

== See also ==
- Catawba (grape)
- History of American wine
- Nicholas Longworth (winemaker)
