= Delhi Township, Ohio =

Township in Ohio, US

Delhi Township, Hamilton County, Ohio
- Township
- Flag Seal
- Nickname: "The Floral Paradise of Ohio"
- Location in Hamilton County and the state of Ohio.
- Coordinates: 39°5′56″N 84°37′25″W
- Country: United States
- State: Ohio
- County: Hamilton

Area
  - Total: 10.1 sq mi (26.1 km^{2})
  - Land: 10.1 sq mi (26.1 km^{2})
  - Water: 0 sq mi (0.0 km^{2})
- Elevation: 856 ft (261 m)

Population (2020)
  - Total: 28,760
  - Density: 2,854/sq mi (1,101.9/km^{2})
- Time zone: UTC-5 (Eastern (EST))
  - Summer (DST): UTC-4 (EDT)
- ZIP code: 45238, 45233
- Area code: 513
- FIPS code: 39-21504
- GNIS feature ID: 1086206
- Website: www.delhi.oh.us

Delhi Township (/ˈdɛlhaɪ/ DELL-high) is one of the twelve townships of Hamilton County, Ohio, United States. The 2020 census found 28,760 people in the township. It is the only Delhi Township statewide.

== History ==
The area of modern-day Delhi Township was first settled by European Americans in 1789 with the founding of the village of South Bend. A year later, when Hamilton County was incorporated, the village loaned its name to South Bend township, which included the present-day location of Delhi Township. In 1809, South Bend Township was divided into Green and Miami townships. Delhi was later split from the southern portions of Green Township in 1816 as a result of a petition from residents. Upon incorporation, the township's name was originally spelled as "Delhigh", although the name morphed into "Delhi" sometime in the nineteenth century for unknown reasons.

=== Sedam Springhouse ===
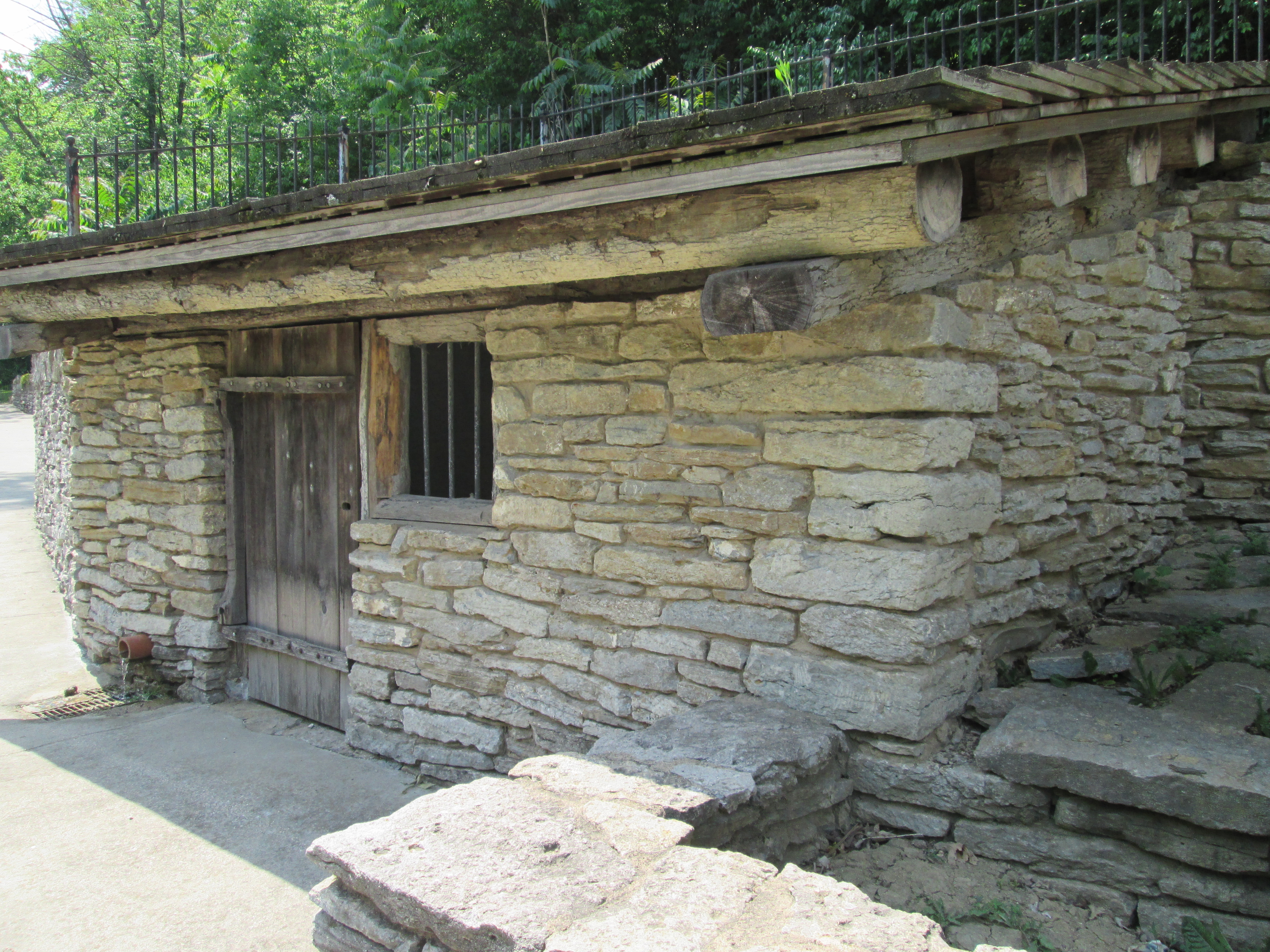
The Sedam/Delhi Springhouse

The Sedam Springhouse, which may date back to the 1790s, is one of the oldest buildings in the township. Now known as the Delhi Springhouse, the structure stands on land near the stone house Colonel Cornelius Ryker Sedam built in 1796. The house no longer exists, but the springhouse has been restored. The structure protected a natural spring, which supplied water as late as 1937. The springhouse was also used to provide storage for perishable foods.

== Geography ==
Located in the southwestern part of the county along the Ohio River, it has the following borders:

- Green Township - north
- Cincinnati - east (Price Hill), west (Sayler Park), and south (Riverside and Sayler Park)
- Miami Township - northwest

Much of what was once part of Delhi Township, including its entire shoreline along the Ohio River, is now part of the city of Cincinnati, the county seat of Hamilton County. Unincorporated communities in the township include Delhi Hills, Delshire, and Mount Saint Joseph. The Cincinnati communities of Price Hill, Sayler Park, Sedamsville and Riverside were part of Delhi Township until they were annexed by Cincinnati at the turn of the 20th century.

The township has an area of 10.1 square miles (26.1 km^{2}). Because the township covers the slopes leading down to the floodplain of the Ohio River, the township contains many hills, and its landscape is cut by a number of ravines caused by streams that make the descent.

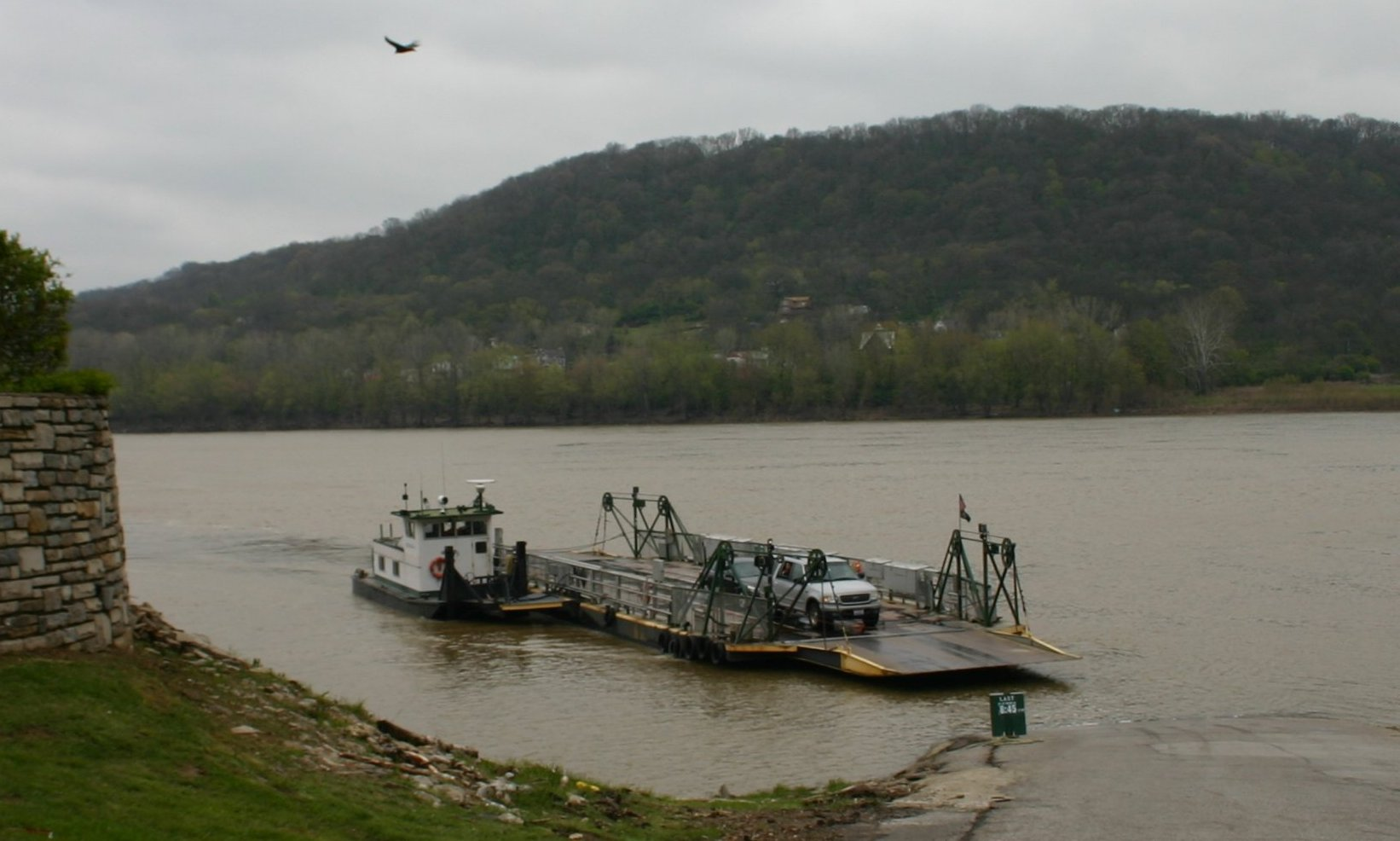
The Anderson Ferry with the hills of Delhi in the background

== Climate ==
Delhi Township is located within a climatic transition zone at the extreme northern limit of the humid subtropical climate. Being located within the northern periphery of the Upland South and also within the Bluegrass region of southern Ohio and Kentucky, the local climate is basically a blend of the subtropics to the south and the humid continental climate to the north.

Delhi Township's average annual rainfall is 41 inches (1,000 mm), received over an average of 82 days, along with 14 inches (360 mm) of snow. Temperatures range from an average July high of 88 °F (31 °C) to an average January low of 15 °F (-5 °C).

== Demographics ==
Historical population
Census	Pop.	Note	%±
1820	1,158		—
1850	1,942		—
1860	2,700		39.0%
1870	2,620		−3.0%
1880	4,738		80.8%
1890	5,497		16.0%
1900	5,317		−3.3%
1910	3,704		−30.3%
1920	1,953		−47.3%
1930	2,821		44.4%
1940	4,175		48.0%
1950	6,347		52.0%
1960	14,579		129.7%
1970	25,785		76.9%
1980	29,078		12.8%
1990	30,250		4.0%
2000	30,104		−0.5%
2010	29,510		−2.0%
2020	28,760		−2.5%

=== 2020 census ===
As of the census of 2020, there were 28,760 people living in the township, for a population density of 2,847.52 people per square mile (1,101.91/km^{2}). There were 11,060 housing units. The racial makeup of the township was 88.9% White, 4.5% Black or African American, 0.2% Native American, 1.1% Asian, 0.0% Pacific Islander, 0.7% from some other race, and 4.8% from two or more races. 1.6% of the population were Hispanic or Latino of any race.

There were 10,647 households, out of which 33.3% had children under the age of 18 living with them, 56.3% were married couples living together, 13.8% had a male householder with no spouse present, and 24.7% had a female householder with no spouse present. 24.0% of all households were made up of individuals, and 12.7% were someone living alone who was 65 years of age or older. The average household size was 2.63, and the average family size was 3.16.

23.8% of the township's population were under the age of 18, 58.2% were 18 to 64, and 18.0% were 65 years of age or older. The median age was 37.6. For every 100 females, there were 96.1 males.

According to the U.S. Census American Community Survey, for the period 2016-2020 the estimated median annual income for a household in the township was $78,809, and the median income for a family was $92,844. About 8.6% of the population were living below the poverty line, including 13.0% of those under age 18 and 3.5% of those age 65 or over. About 65.6% of the population were employed, and 30.1% had a bachelor's degree or higher.

== Government ==
The township is governed by a three-member board of trustees, who are elected in November of odd-numbered years to a four-year term beginning on the following January 1. Two are elected in the year after the presidential election and one is elected in the year before it. There is also an elected township fiscal officer, who serves a four-year term beginning on April 1 of the year after the election, which is held in November of the year before the presidential election. Vacancies in the fiscal officership or on the board of trustees are filled by the remaining trustees.

== Infrastructure ==
=== Fire department ===
Three fire stations serve the township. Fire Station #33 serves as the fire department's headquarters. The other stations are Station #30 and Station #36.

== Culture and recreation ==
=== Delhi Skirt Game ===
Delhi has various annual celebrations, including the Delhi Skirt Game. The Delhi Skirt Game is a Chicago-style softball game between officers of the Delhi Township Police Department and the firefighters of the Delhi Township Fire Department; the teams consist of male officers dressed in drag. The game is played in Delhi Park on the first Friday of August, with festivities surrounding the game including live music, games of chance, concessions, auctions and fireworks. The Skirt Game benefits needy families of Delhi Township.

=== "Floral Paradise" ===
Following an 1850s grape blight which destroyed most of the township's vineyards, many growers turned to vegetable farming. On the heels of a successful transition to vegetable farming, growers began to construct greenhouses in order to extend the growing season. At some point in the 1920–1930s, nearly all of the Delhi greenhouse operators began to realize the greater profit potential of growing flowers, and subsequently converted their greenhouses from vegetable-centric operations to growing cut flowers full-time.

The peak of local hothouse agriculture was reached during the late pre-WWII years, when as many as 55 family-run greenhouses operated in the township. Notably, Delhi Township-based greenhouses produced a significant percentage of carnations supplied throughout the United States by this time. In the local region, Delhi Township became known as the "Floral Paradise of Ohio", a trademark phrase that is still featured on modern, official Delhi Township signage.

The importance of greenhouses in Delhi Township was even reflected in the equipment of the Delhi Township Fire Department; as late as 1986, small-diameter fire attack lines were equipped with iron pipe couplings (rather than otherwise ubiquitous National Standard threads) in order to be compatible with the fittings in use on most greenhouse irrigation standpipes of the time. This arrangement permitted firefighters to connect their hoses to the source of water closest to an interior greenhouse fire, eliminating the need to drag (potentially) hundreds of feet of heavy, charged hose connected at the fire apparatus's pump panel outside. In this arrangement, water pressure in the involved greenhouse was boosted by a connection from the pumper to a standpipe connection on the outside of the structure. The requirement to carry a large variety of thread adapters (in order to be compatible with nearby, mutual aid departments), along with the rapid, penultimate decline of hothouse agriculture in Delhi Township led to the complete standardization to National Standard-threaded couplings within the department by the late 1980s.

Today, only a few family-run greenhouses remain—the combined results of a decline in business due to foreign flower imports, as well as the lucrative conversion of greenhouse properties to land made available for residential and commercial development in the post-World War II suburbanization boom.

=== Parks ===
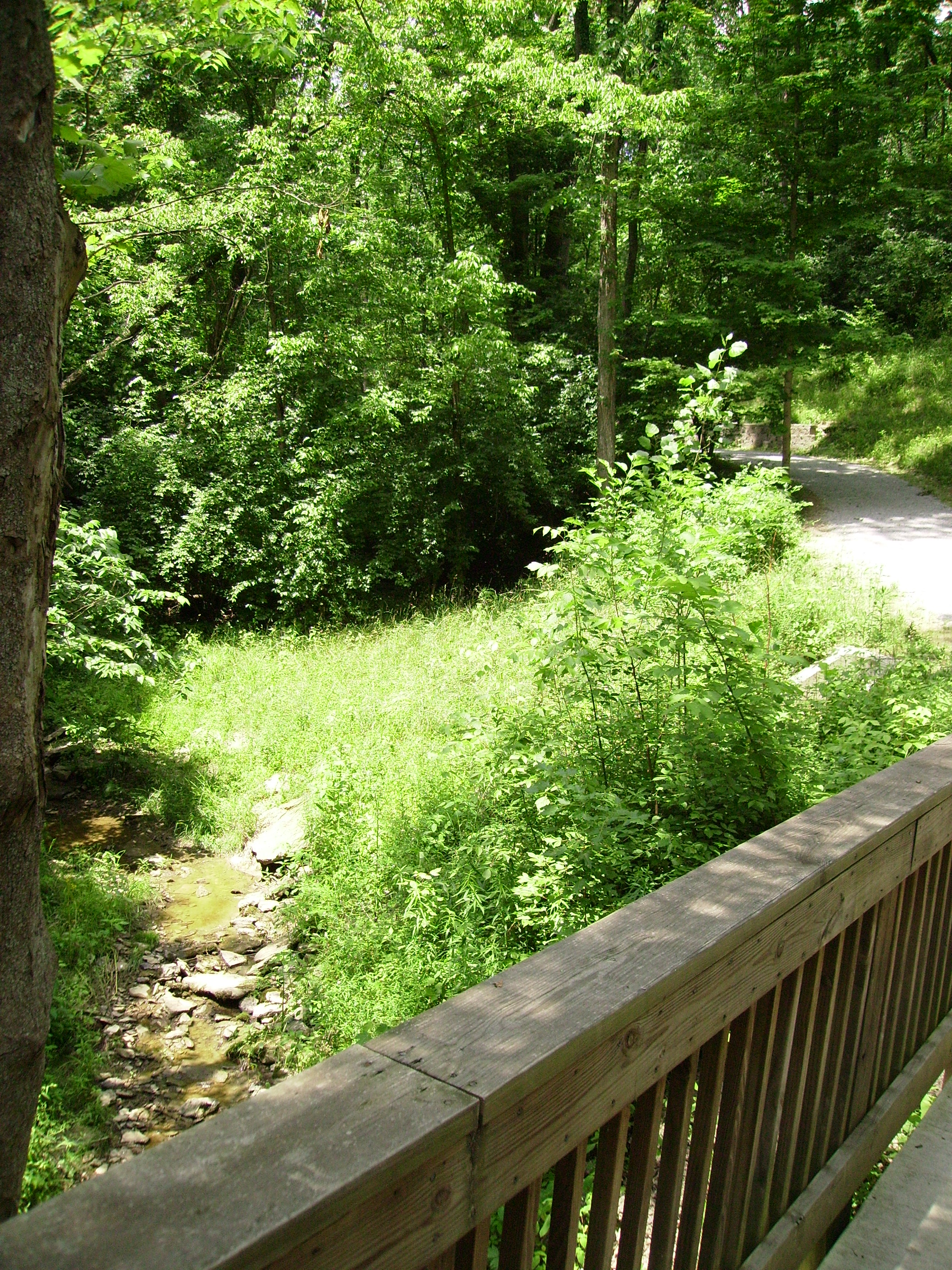
Story Woods Park, part of the Delhi Park system, has three main paths and is located within woods next to Rapid Run Middle School.

The township operates over 100 acres (40 ha) of park property. Parks operated by the township include Delhi Park, Five-Points Park, and Story Woods Park. Delhi Park, which opened in 1954, is the oldest park in the township. It has nine ball fields, including baseball courts, football fields, soccer fields, tennis courts, and sand volleyball courts. Delhi Park also has the Glen Carder Lodge, four picnic shelters and the "Spray Park." Five-Points Park, a 1.1 acres (0.45 ha) park, has a gazebo and the firefighter's memorial. Story Woods Park, a 40 acres (16 ha) park, has a playground facility, a picnic shelter, toilet facilities, and 2.03 miles (3.27 km) of walking trails. The township also has the Delhi Springhouse, which opened to protect the springs. The springhouse was also used as a source of drinking water and as cold storage for perishable foods. The Great Parks of Hamilton County operates Embshoff Woods, a park which opened in 1982 and consists of 331 acres (134 ha) of protected natural areas.

In November 2007, the township dedicated Veterans Memorial Park in honor of the township's military veterans. Located within the park are the Wall of Honor Monument and the Killed-in-Action Memorial.

=== Newspaper ===
The Delhi Press serves the areas of Delhi and Sayler Park, Cincinnati.

== Education ==
=== Colleges and universities ===
Mount St. Joseph University is located in Delhi Township.

=== Primary and secondary schools ===
Oak Hills Local School District operates public schools in Delhi Township. Public schools within the township include Delshire Elementary School, C.O. Harrison Elementary School, Delhi Middle School, and Rapid Run Middle School. Oak Hills High School, outside of the township, serves as the area high school.

Private schools in the township include Our Lady of Victory (Cincinnati) School and St. Dominic School. Other area schools include Elder High School and Seton High School.

== Public libraries ==
The Public Library of Cincinnati and Hamilton County operates the Delhi Township Branch. The township first received a library in 1949 when a collection of books opened in Delhi Public School. A permanent library facility was dedicated in January 1968. In 1999, an addition added 5,000 square feet (460 m^{2}) of space to the building, increased the size of the collection, expanded the children's area, added a glass reading room, and altered the landscaping. The branch was renamed to the Delhi Township Branch Library during its reopening and rededication.

== Notable residents ==
- Sebastian Rentz (winemaker)
- Jim Herman
- Andy Biersack
