= Sedam Springhouse =

Coordinates: 39°05′46″N 84°35′22″W

The Sedam Springhouse is located on Delhi Pike near the intersection with Mayhew Avenue, in Delhi Township, Hamilton County, Ohio, United States, just west of Cincinnati. The structure has been preserving perishables and watering plants and people for more than two centuries. This historic building is thought to have been built in the 1790s; it was once owned by Col. Cornelius Sedam and was built over a spring that spews a stream of water out of the hillside.

In 2005, the Ohio Historical Society presented an award to Delhi Township for the preservation of the Sedam Springhouse. The work took more than a year, and was mostly paid by a federal grant.

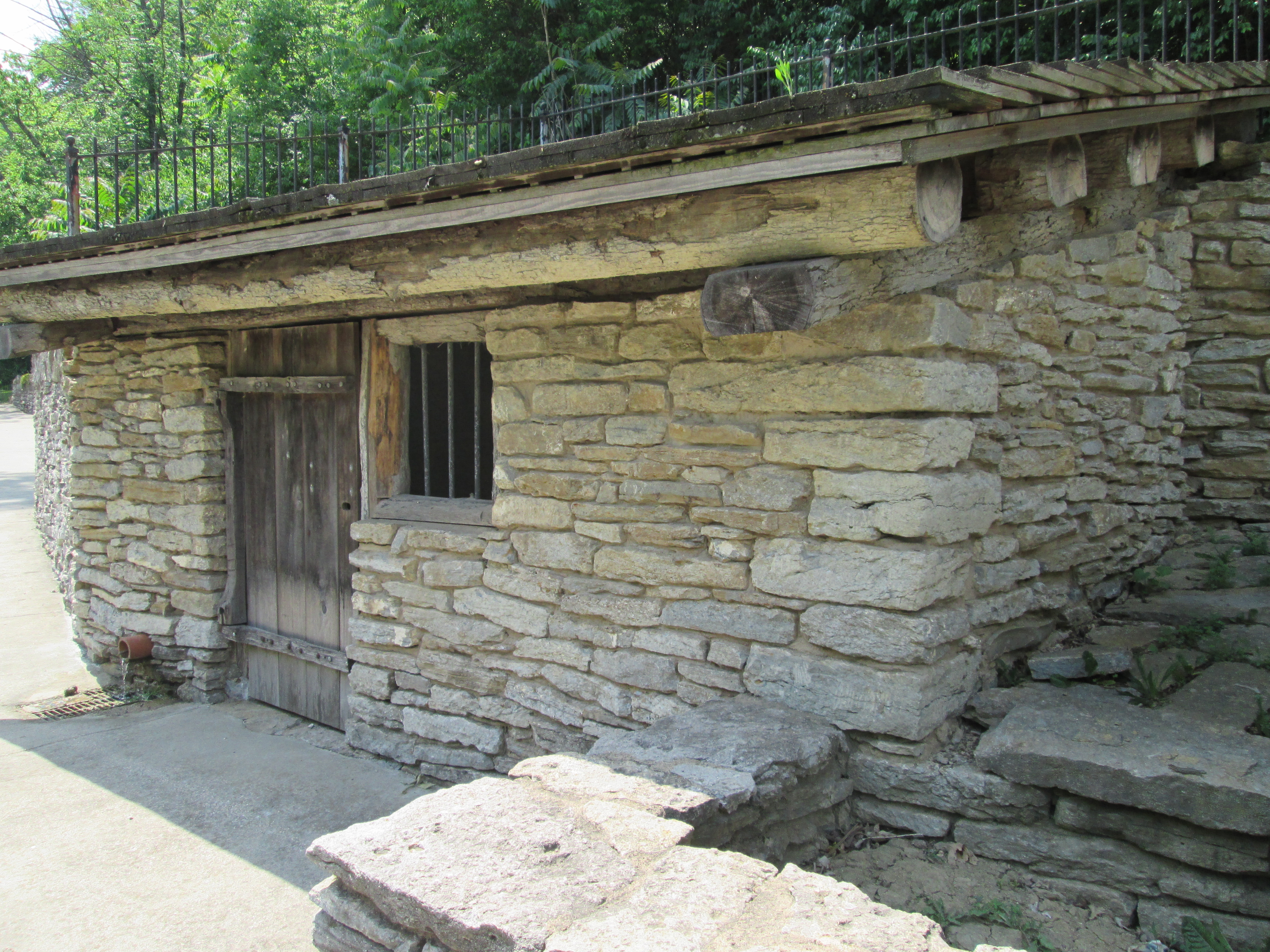
The Sedam/Delhi Springhouse
