= Covedale, Ohio =

- Census-designated place
- Location in Hamilton County and the state of Ohio.
- Coordinates: 39°7′34″N 84°37′41″W
- Country: United States
- State: Ohio
- County: Hamilton

Area
  - Total: 2.83 sq mi (7.32 km^{2})
  - Land: 2.83 sq mi (7.32 km^{2})
  - Water: 0 sq mi (0.00 km^{2})
- Elevation: 860 ft (260 m)

Population (2020)
  - Total: 6,472
  - Density: 2,289/sq mi (883.7/km^{2})
- Time zone: UTC-5 (Eastern (EST))
  - Summer (DST): UTC-4 (EDT)
- ZIP code: 45238
- Area code: 513
- FIPS code: 39-19008
- GNIS feature ID: 2393387

Covedale is a census-designated place (CDP) in Green Township, Hamilton County, Ohio, United States. The population was 6,472 at the 2020 census. The CDP represents the part of the former village of Covedale that was not annexed by the city of Cincinnati in 1930.

== Geography ==
Covedale is located near Interstate 74, and is within the I-275 loop, about 8 miles (13 km) west of downtown Cincinnati.

According to the United States Census Bureau, the CDP has a total area of 2.8 square miles (7.3 km^{2}), all land.

== Demographics ==
Historical population
Census	Pop.	Note	%±
2020	6,472		—
U.S. Decennial Census

=== 2020 census ===
As of the census of 2020, there were 6,472 people living in the CDP, for a population density of 2,288.54 people per square mile (883.70/km^{2}). There were 2,668 housing units. The racial makeup of the CDP was 85.6% White, 7.8% Black or African American, 0.2% Native American, 0.9% Asian, 0.1% Pacific Islander, 0.8% from some other race, and 4.7% from two or more races. 1.8% of the population were Hispanic or Latino of any race.

There were 2,492 households, out of which 35.3% had children under the age of 18 living with them, 56.7% were married couples living together, 16.1% had a male householder with no spouse present, and 24.0% had a female householder with no spouse present. 24.0% of all households were made up of individuals, and 13.3% were someone living alone who was 65 years of age or older. The average household size was 2.66, and the average family size was 3.12.

29.4% of the CDP's population were under the age of 18, 51.0% were 18 to 64, and 19.6% were 65 years of age or older. The median age was 39.3. For every 100 females, there were 102.6 males.

According to the U.S. Census American Community Survey, for the period 2016-2020 the estimated median annual income for a household in the CDP was $80,000, and the median income for a family was $103,673. About 5.5% of the population were living below the poverty line, including 9.6% of those under age 18 and 3.5% of those age 65 or over. About 61.0% of the population were employed, and 42.5% had a bachelor's degree or higher.

=== 2000 census ===
At the 2000 census there were 6,360 people, 2,432 households, and 1,826 families in the CDP. The population density was 2,274.3 inhabitants per square mile (878.1/km^{2}). There were 2,505 housing units at an average density of 895.8 per square mile (345.9/km^{2}). The racial makup of the CDP was 98.58% White, 0.35% African American, 0.13% Native American, 0.31% Asian, 0.20% from other races, and 0.42% from two or more races. Hispanic or Latino of any race were 0.64%.

Of the 2,432 households 30.7% had children under the age of 18 living with them, 64.8% were married couples living together, 7.9% had a female householder with no husband present, and 24.9% were non-families. 22.5% of households were one person and 12.2% were one person aged 65 or older. The average household size was 2.61 and the average family size was 3.08.

The age distribution was 25.3% under the age of 18, 6.4% from 18 to 24, 25.5% from 25 to 44, 23.7% from 45 to 64, and 19.1% 65 or older. The median age was 40 years. For every 100 females, there were 93.0 males. For every 100 females age 18 and over, there were 88.3 males.

The median household income was $57,016 and the median family income was $65,456. Males had a median income of $40,697 versus $32,182 for females. The per capita income for the CDP was $28,845. About 0.8% of families and 1.9% of the population were below the poverty line, including 3.1% of those under age 18 and 0.4% of those age 65 or over.
