= Mount Saint Joseph, Ohio =

Unincorporated community in Ohio, U.S.

Coordinates: 39°05′47″N 84°38′15″W

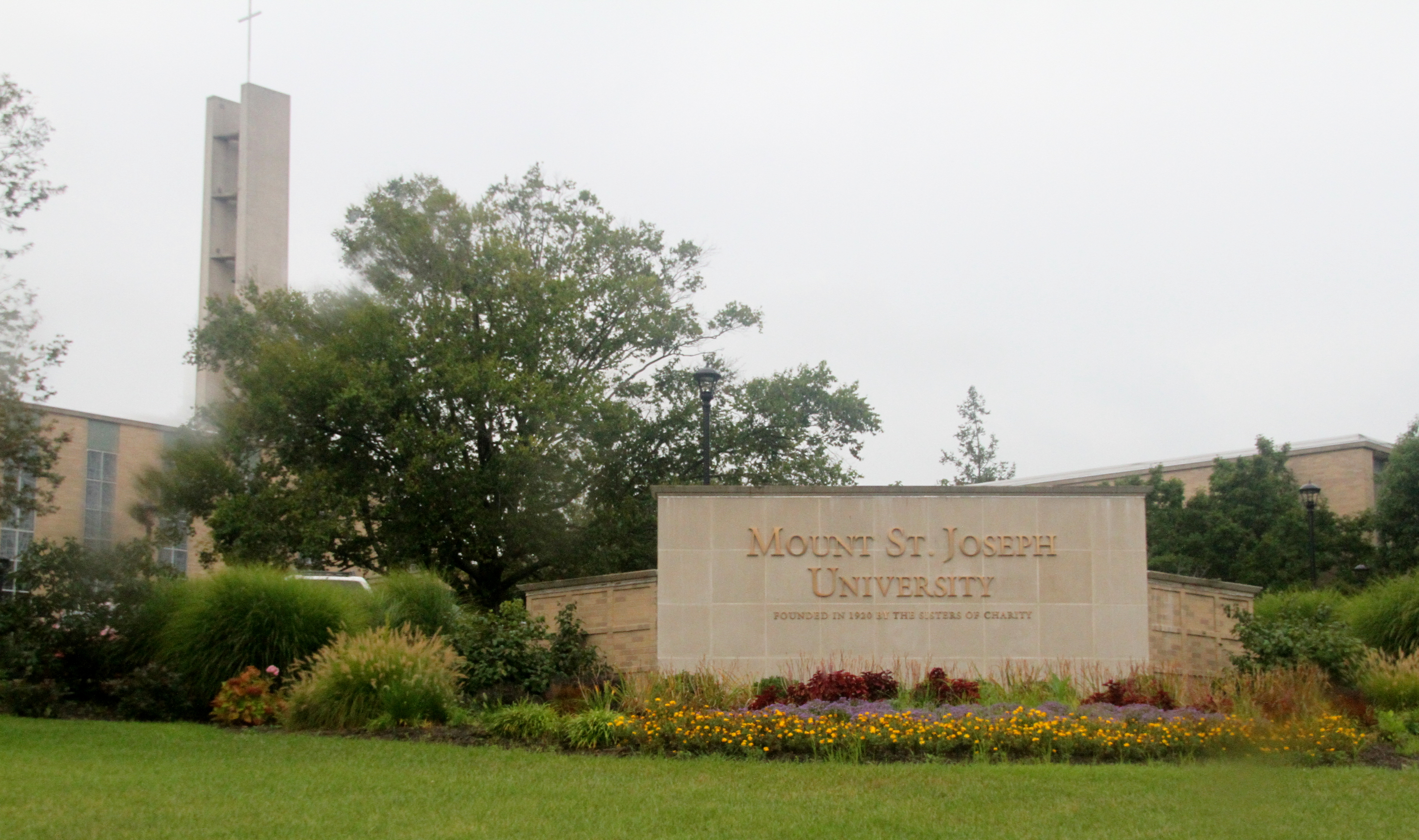
Mount Saint Joseph University

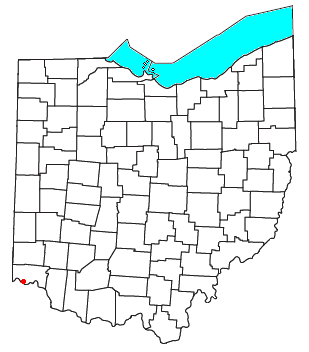
Location of Mount Saint Joseph, Ohio

Mount Saint Joseph is an unincorporated community in central Delhi Township, Hamilton County, Ohio, United States. It has a post office with the ZIP code 45051. Because it includes the motherhouse of the Sisters of Charity of Cincinnati, the Internal Revenue Service recognizes 45051 as the eighth most generous ZIP code in the United States, with residents giving 41.50% of their net income to charity. The unincorporated community is also home to the Mount St. Joseph University.
