= Delhi Hills, Ohio =

- Census-designated place
- Location in Hamilton County and the state of Ohio.
- Coordinates: 39°05′13″N 84°37′25″W
- Country: United States
- State: Ohio
- County: Hamilton

Area
  - Total: 1.47 sq mi (3.82 km^{2})
  - Land: 1.47 sq mi (3.82 km^{2})
  - Water: 0 sq mi (0.00 km^{2})
- Elevation: 896 ft (273 m)

Population (2020)
  - Total: 5,022
  - Density: 3,404.6/sq mi (1,314.52/km^{2})
- Time zone: UTC-5 (Eastern (EST))
  - Summer (DST): UTC-4 (EDT)
- Area code: 513
- FIPS code: 39-21518
- GNIS feature ID: 2585505

Delhi Hills is a census-designated place (CDP) in Delhi Township, Hamilton County, Ohio, United States. The population was 5,022 at the 2020 census.

== Geography ==
Delhi Hills is located on a bluff north of the Ohio River. It lies 7 miles (11 km) west of downtown Cincinnati.

According to the United States Census Bureau, the CDP has a total area of 1.5 square miles (3.9 km^{2}), all land.

== Demographics ==
As of the census of 2020, there were 5,022 people living in the CDP, for a population density of 3,404.75 people per square mile (1,314.52/km^{2}). There were 1,846 housing units. The racial makeup of the CDP was 87.4% White, 3.8% Black or African American, 0.2% Native American, 1.8% Asian, 0.0% Pacific Islander, 0.9% from some other race, and 5.9% from two or more races. 1.7% of the population were Hispanic or Latino of any race.

There were 1,882 households, out of which 32.8% had children under the age of 18 living with them, 68.3% were married couples living together, 12.3% had a male householder with no spouse present, and 15.0% had a female householder with no spouse present. 17.0% of all households were made up of individuals, and 9.4% were someone living alone who was 65 years of age or older. The average household size was 2.65, and the average family size was 2.99.

22.9% of the CDP's population were under the age of 18, 61.0% were 18 to 64, and 16.1% were 65 years of age or older. The median age was 43.9. For every 100 females, there were 101.6 males.

According to the U.S. Census American Community Survey, for the period 2016-2020 the estimated median annual income for a household in the CDP was $92,279, and the median income for a family was $106,389. About 4.1% of the population were living below the poverty line, including 0.7% of those under age 18 and 6.6% of those age 65 or over. About 67.1% of the population were employed, and 24.6% had a bachelor's degree or higher.
