= Pete Rose Jr. =

American baseball player (born 1969)

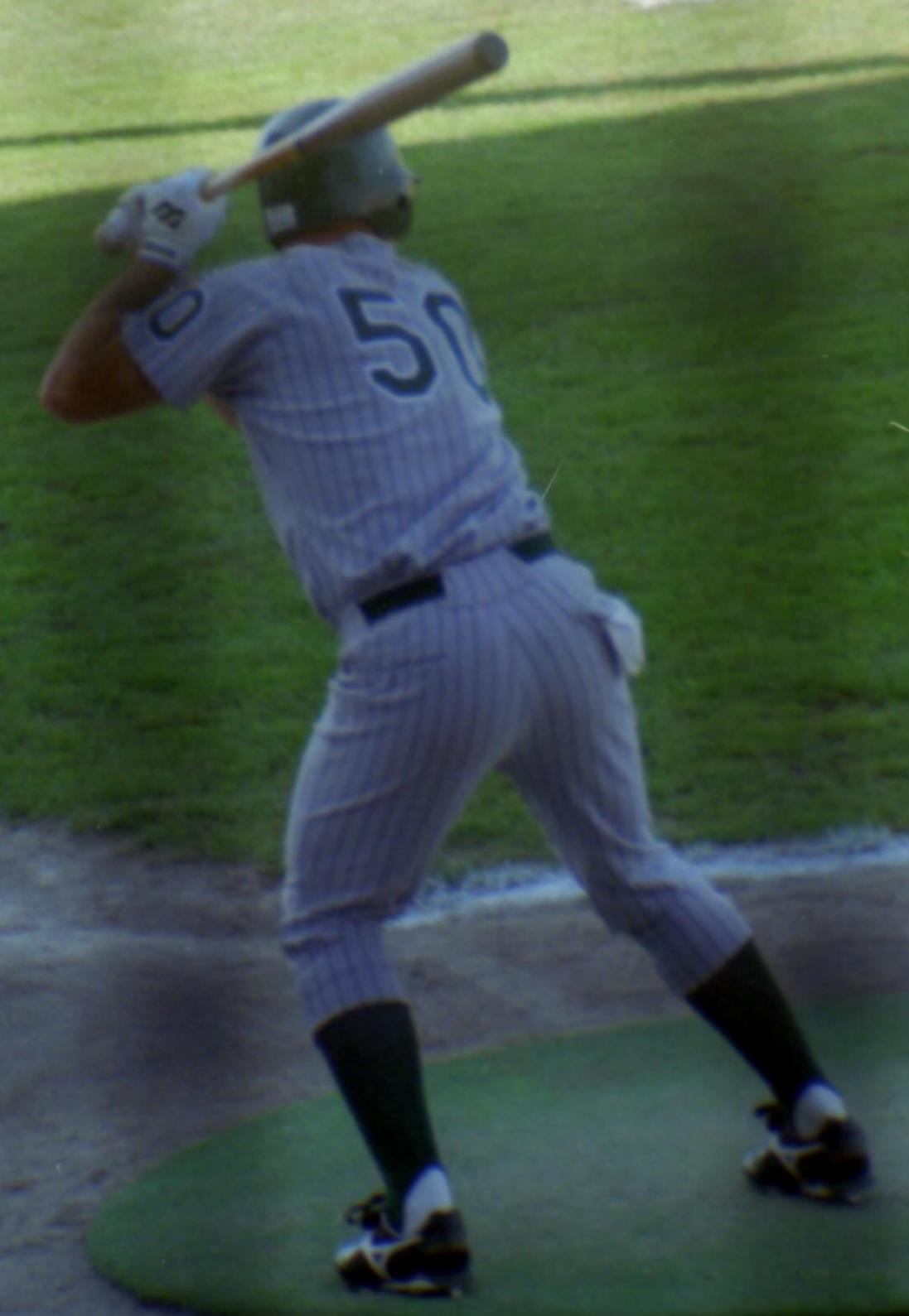
- Rose with the South Bend Silver Hawks in 1995
- First baseman
- Born: November 16, 1969 (age 56); Cincinnati, Ohio, U.S.
- Batted: Left Threw: Right

MLB debut
- September 1, 1997, for the Cincinnati Reds

Last MLB appearance
- September 28, 1997, for the Cincinnati Reds

MLB statistics
- Batting average: .143
- Home runs: 0
- Runs batted in: 0
- Stats at Baseball Reference

Teams
- Cincinnati Reds (1997)

Peter Edward "PJ" Rose Jr. (born November 16, 1969) is an American former professional baseball player and manager. The son of Major League Baseball's all-time hits leader Pete Rose, Rose Jr. played in the minor leagues for most of his career except for a brief stint in 1997 for the Cincinnati Reds. Rose has since worked as a manager of multiple teams in both affiliated and independent minor league baseball.

== Early life ==
Peter Edward "PJ" Rose Jr. was born on November 16, 1969, in Cincinnati, Ohio. Rose was often shown on national television during his childhood years as a batboy for his father's teams. When his father joined the Phillies in 1979, Rose spent time with Aaron Boone, Bret Boone, Ryan Luzinski, and Mark McGraw in the Phillies clubhouse. He appeared on a 1982 Fleer baseball card (#640) titled "Pete & Re-Pete; Pete Rose & son" with his father; he was twelve at the time. As a teenager, on September 11, 1985, he made an emotional on-field appearance live on ESPN to celebrate with his father after Rose Sr. broke Ty Cobb's record for most career hits. In his youth, Rose played baseball for Bridgetown, a suburb of Cincinnati.

== Professional career ==
=== Draft and minor leagues ===
Rose would later become a fixture in baseball's minor leagues. He began his pro baseball career when he was drafted by the Baltimore Orioles and was assigned to the Erie Orioles of the New York–Penn League in 1989. In 1990 he joined the class A Frederick Keys of the Carolina League. In 1992 he played for the Columbus Red Stixx of the class A South Atlantic League. In 1993 he returned to the Carolina League this time playing for the Prince William Cannons (Woodbridge, Virginia -White Sox affiliate). In April 1994 Rose was signed by the Chicago White Sox.

Rose's best minor league season was in 1997 at Chattanooga, for the Chattanooga Lookouts, at age 27. He hit .308 in 112 games with 25 home runs, 98 RBIs, 31 doubles and 75 runs scored for the Lookouts.

=== Cincinnati Reds (1997) ===
Later that year, Rose was called up to the Cincinnati Reds for his only appearances in the major leagues. He hit .143 in 11 games for the Reds, but was widely shown on popular sports highlight shows when he copied his father's famous crouching batting stance during the first pitch of his first Major League at-bat. The junior Rose's two MLB hits give him and his father 4,258 combined hits, the fourth-most ever by a father and son behind Bobby and Barry Bonds, Ken Griffey Sr. and Jr., and Gus and Buddy Bell. The Roses are also the only father-and-son combo to get over 6,000 hits in professional baseball, including both majors and minors, with 6,467 at the end of 2009.

=== Later career ===
In 1998, while playing for the Indianapolis Indians of the International League, Rose and three teammates hit for the rare "homer cycle" in one inning; Rose opened the inning with a solo home run; Jason Williams, three at-bats later, hit a three-run home run; four batters later, Glen Murray hit a grand slam; and two hitters later, Guillermo Garcia hit a two-run shot to complete the cycle.

Rose played for the Tigres de Chinandega, a Nicaraguan professional baseball team during the 2007–2008 offseason. In 2007 and 2008, he played for the Long Island Ducks of the independent Atlantic League. He signed with the York Revolution on June 27, 2009, and was released on September 14. After he retired from playing professional baseball and become a coach.

== Coaching career ==
In 2011, Rose joined the White Sox coaching staff and became the manager of their Appalachian League (rookie league) affiliate in Bristol. In 2013, he moved up to the Pioneer League with the affiliate in Great Falls, Montana. After one season, he advanced to the lower-A South Atlantic League team in Kannapolis, North Carolina.

On February 16, 2016, Rose was named manager of the Wichita Wingnuts in the American Association of Independent Professional Baseball. In 2017, the team announced that his contract would not be renewed.

== Conviction for GBL distribution ==
In November 2005, Rose was indicted for distributing gamma-Butyrolactone (GBL) to his Lookouts teammates in the late 1990s. GBL is known to be sold under the counter at retailers as a sports performance enhancer as well as a sedative. When taken orally, GBL is converted to the "date-rape" drug GHB [gamma hydroxybutyrate]. Rose pleaded guilty to this charge on November 7, 2005, claiming that he distributed GBL to teammates to help them relax after games. On May 1, 2006, Rose was convicted and sentenced to one month in federal prison and house arrest for five more months after release from prison.

During that time, he started with the Bridgeport Bluefish on July 25, 2006, and played for them through the remainder of the 2006 season.

In December 2007, Rose's name was released in Kirk Radomski's unsealed affidavit as an alleged user of performance-enhancing drugs. Rose was one of only four baseball players listed in the affidavit who was not referenced in the Mitchell Report, together with Sid Fernandez, Rick Holyfield, and Ryan Schurman.

== Career statistics ==
=== Minor League ===
- Games: 1,918
- At Bats: 6,938
- Hits: 1,879
- Runs: 897
- Doubles: 357
- Triples: 30
- Home runs: 158
- Runs batted in: 536
- Batting average: .271
- Bases on balls: 723
- Strikeouts: 825
- Stolen bases: 36
- Caught stealing: 27

=== Major League ===
- Games: 11
- At bats: 14
- Runs scored: 2
- Hits: 2
- Doubles: 0
- Triples: 0
- Home runs: 0
- Runs batted in: 1
- Total bases: 2
- Bases on balls: 2
- Strikeouts: 9
- Stolen bases: 0
- Caught stealing: 0
- On-base percentage: .250
- Slugging percentage: .143
- Batting average: .143

== See also ==
- List of second-generation Major League Baseball players
