= Miami University Airport =

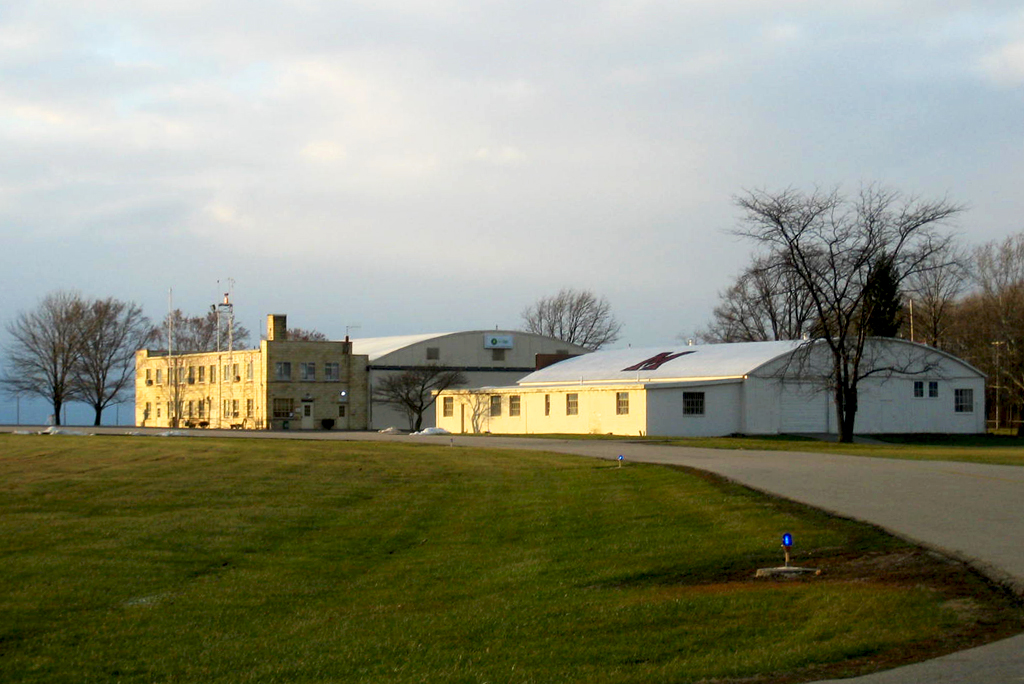
- IATA: OXD; ICAO: KOXD; FAA LID: OXD

Summary
- Airport type: Public
- Owner: Miami University
- Operator: CVG Airport
- Serves: Oxford, Ohio
- Time zone: UTC−05:00 (-5)
  - Summer (DST): UTC−04:00 (-4)
- Elevation AMSL: 1,041 ft (317 m)
- Coordinates: 39°30′08″N 084°47′04″W
- Website: Oxford Airport

Map
- Location of airport in Ohio OXD (the United States)

Runways
| Direction | Length | | Surface |
| Direction | ft | m | Surface |
|---|---|---|---|
| 5/23 | 4,011 | 1,223 | Asphalt |

Statistics (2022)
- Aircraft operations (year ending 9/22/2022): 17,316
- Based aircraft: 14
- Source: Federal Aviation Administration

Miami University Airport (IATA: OXD, ICAO: KOXD, FAA LID: OXD) is a public use airport located two nautical miles (3.7 km) west of the central business district of Oxford, a city in Butler County, Ohio, United States. The airport is owned by Miami University but is operated by Cincinnati/Northern Kentucky International Airport.

The airport has a particular focus on national security. It hosts events such as law and drug enforcement flights as well as military practices.

== History ==
Efforts to build an airport for the university began as early as 16 January 1942, when it received a $30,000 grant from the state to purchase land. By the end of the month a site had been selected and authorization given to purchase 300 acres (120 ha) of land on which to build two runways. In the meantime, students in the university's Civilian Pilot Training Program used Hamilton Airport. Construction was underway by mid October and it was announced a 6,000-square-foot (560 m^{2}) hangar would be moved from Western Hills Airport in February 1943. Miami University Airport had partially opened by late June 1943.

The runway was paved in 1960. A financial gift paid for the installation of a low-frequency radio beacon in 1966.

In September 1988, it was announced that the runway would be extended from 3,000 feet (910 m) to 3,700 feet (1,100 m).

By late November 2001 the upstairs apartment had been renovated and there were plans repave the runway.

The airport received a grant to extend the taxiway in 2010.

== Facilities and aircraft ==
Miami University Airport covers an area of 309 acres (125 ha) at an elevation of 1,041 feet (317 m) above mean sea level. It has one runway designated 5/23 with an asphalt surface measuring 4,011 by 70 feet (1,223 x 21 m).

The airport has a fixed-base operator that sells fuel. It has services such as general maintenance, hangars, and courtesy cars as well as amenities like conference rooms, pilot supplies, a crew lounge, and more.

For the 12-month period ending September 22, 2022, the airport had 17,316 aircraft operations, an average of 47 per day: 99% general aviation, <1% air taxi, <1% military. At that time there were 14 aircraft based at this airport: 12 single-engine and 2 multi-engine.

== Accidents and incidents ==
- On 21 September 1948, a BT-13 crashed after taking off from the airport, killing the pilot. The airplane which spun in from 400 feet (120 m), was being operated by a pilot who had previously had his license revoked for reckless flying.

== See also ==
- List of airports in Ohio
