= Oak Hills High School =

Public, coeducational high school in Cincinnati, Ohio, United States

Location
- 3200 Ebenezer Road; Cincinnati, (Hamilton County), Ohio 45248; United States; 39°8′49″N 84°38′57″W

Information
- Type: Public, Coeducational high school
- Established: 1958
- School district: Oak Hills Local School District
- Superintendent: Dan Beckenhaupt
- Principal: Brian Conners
- Faculty: 253
- Teaching staff: 93.00 (FTE)
- Grades: 9-12
- Student to teacher ratio: 24.57
- Colors: Red and Black
- Fight song: "On Highlanders"
- Athletics conference: Greater Miami Conference
- Mascot: Highlander
- Team name: Highlanders
- Accreditation: North Central Association of Colleges and Schools
- Newspaper: The Tartan
- Website: School website

Oak Hills High School is a four-year public secondary school located in Bridgetown, Ohio, with a mailing address of Cincinnati. Oak Hills often is referred to as "OHHS" by its students and faculty. It is run by the Oak Hills Local School District.

With approximately 2,300 students enrolled annually, Oak Hills is one of the largest public high schools in Ohio. It is a member of the 10-school Greater Miami Conference.

== Athletics ==
=== Ohio High School Athletic Association State Championships ===
- Boys Bowling - 2004 State Team Champion's
- Coed Cheerleading - 2016 OASSA Division I Mount State Champion
- Mock Trial - 1987, 2003, 2007 State Champions
- Boys Baseball – 1980
- Girls Swimming and Diving – 1982

State Runner-up

- Boys Soccer – 1980 (lost in double overtime)
- Baseball- 1981
- Girls Basketball - 1986
- Coed Cheerleading - 2015 OASSA Division I Mount State Champion Runner Up

== Notable alumni and faculty ==
- John Bardo, educator, President of Wichita State University, Chancellor of Western Carolina University.
- Rick Charls, former professional high diver who currently holds the record for the world's highest dive at 172 ft.
- Chris Ensminger, professional basketball player and coach
- Susan Floyd, Actress
- Rich Franklin, professional mixed martial arts fighter and former UFC Middleweight champion; former math teacher at Oak Hills
- Scott Klingenbeck, former MLB player for the Cincinnati Reds
- Yoshi Oyakawa (former faculty member/ coach), 1952 Olympic gold medalist in the 100m Backstroke.
- Kim Rhodenbaugh, US Olympic Team, 1984 (swimming). Kim appeared on a Wheaties box in 1989 as part of the product's "Search for Champions II" promotion.
- Pete Rose Jr., former professional baseball player, former manager of the Wichita Wingnuts, son of Pete Rose (not an alumnus)
- Alex Triantafilou, Judge of Hamilton County Court of Common Pleas, Chairman Ohio Republican Party
- Bill Wegman, former MLB pitcher for the Milwaukee Brewers
- Brett Wetterich, PGA Tour golfer, winner EDS Byron Nelson Championship (2006)
