= Oak Hills Local School District =

School district in Ohio, United States

Address
- 6325 Rapid Run Road Cincinnati, Ohio, 45233; United States

District information
- Type: Public
- Grades: PK–12
- Schools: 11
- NCES District ID: 3904737

Students and staff
- Students: 7,381 (2024–2025)
- Teachers: 333.50 (on an FTE basis) (2024–2025)
- Staff: 974.77 (on an FTE basis) (2024–2025)
- Student–teacher ratio: 22.13 (2024–2025)

Other information
- Website: www.ohlsd.us

Oak Hills Local School District is a public school district in Hamilton County, Ohio that includes Delhi Township and about half of Green Township. As of 2026, 7,485 students attended its nine schools. Approximately 2,594 attend its only high school annually, making it one of the largest of Greater Cincinnati's suburban public high schools.

The Oak Hills Local School Board is composed of a Board President, Vice-President, and three Members.

== Schools ==
- Oak Hills High School
- Bridgetown Middle School
- Delhi Middle School
- Rapid Run Middle School
- Charles W. Springmyer Elementary School
- C.O. Harrison Elementary School
- Delshire Elementary School
- John Foster Dulles Elementary School
- Oakdale Elementary School
