= Census-designated place =

Concentration of population defined by the United States Census Bureau

A census-designated place (CDP) is a concentration of population defined by the United States Census Bureau for statistical purposes only. The U.S. Census Bureau defines a CDP as a "statistical geography representing closely settled, unincorporated communities that are locally recognized and identified by name".

CDPs have been used in each decennial census since 1980 as the counterparts of incorporated places, such as self-governing cities, towns, and villages, for the purposes of gathering and correlating statistical data. CDPs are populated areas that generally include one officially designated but currently unincorporated community, for which the CDP is named, and may include surrounding inhabited countryside of varying dimensions and, occasionally, other, smaller unincorporated communities. CDPs include small rural communities, edge cities, colonias located along the Mexico–United States border, and unincorporated resorts and retirement communities and their environs. The boundaries of any CDP may change from decade to decade, and the Census Bureau may de-establish a CDP after a period of study, then re-establish it some decades later. Most unincorporated areas within the United States are not and have not been included in any CDP.

The boundaries of a CDP have no legal status and may not always correspond with the local understanding of the area or community with the same name. However, criteria established for the 2010 census require that a CDP name "be one that is recognized and used in daily communication by the residents of the community" (not "a name developed solely for planning or other purposes") and recommend that a CDP's boundaries be mapped based on the geographic extent associated with inhabitants' regular use of the named place. There is no provision, however, that this name recognition be unanimous for all residents, or that all residents use the community for which the CDP is named for services provided therein. There is no mandatory correlation between CDP names or boundaries and those established for other human purposes, such as post office names or zones, political precincts, or school districts.

Although census-designated places are not considered incorporated places, the Census Bureau includes CDPs in its city population list for Hawaii because that state has no incorporated cities. In addition, census city lists from 2007 included Arlington County, Virginia's CDP in the list with the incorporated places, but since 2010, only the Urban Honolulu CDP, Hawaii, representing the historic core of Honolulu, Hawaii, is shown in the city and town estimates.

== History ==
The Census Bureau reported data for some unincorporated places as early as the first census in 1790 (for example, Louisville, Kentucky, which was not legally incorporated in Kentucky until 1828), though usage continued to develop through the 1890 census, in which the census mixed unincorporated places with incorporated places in its products with "town" or "village" as its label. This made it confusing to determine which of the "towns" were or were not incorporated.

The 1900 through 1930 censuses did not report data for unincorporated places.

For the 1940 census, the Census Bureau compiled a separate report of unofficial, unincorporated communities of 500 or more people. The Census Bureau officially defined this category as "unincorporated places" in the 1950 census and used that term through the 1970 census. For the 1950 census, these types of places were identified only outside "urbanized areas". In 1960, the Census Bureau also identified unincorporated places inside urbanized areas (except in New England, whose political geography is based on the New England town, and is distinctly different from other areas of the U.S.), but with a population of at least 10,000. For the 1970 census, the population threshold for "unincorporated places" in urbanized areas was reduced to 5,000.

For the 1980 census, the designation was changed to "census designated places" and the designation was made available for places inside urbanized areas in New England. For the 1990 census, the population threshold for CDPs in urbanized areas was reduced to 2,500. From 1950 through 1990, the Census Bureau specified other population requirements for unincorporated places or CDPs in Alaska, Puerto Rico, island areas, and Native American reservations. Minimum population criteria for CDPs were dropped with the 2000 census.

The Census Bureau's Participant Statistical Areas Program (PSAP) allows designated participants to propose new CDPS as well as review and suggest modifications to the boundaries of existing CDPs. The PSAP was to be offered to county and municipal planning agencies in 2008.

== Effects of designation and examples ==
The boundaries of such places are typically defined in cooperation with local county or tribal officials, but are not fixed, and do not affect the status of local government or incorporation; the territories thus defined are strictly statistical entities. CDP boundaries may change from one census to the next to reflect changes in settlement patterns. Further, as statistical entities, the boundaries of the CDP may not correspond with local understanding of the area with the same name. Recognized communities may be divided into two or more CDPs while on the other hand, two or more communities may be combined into one CDP. A CDP may also cover the unincorporated part of a named community, where the rest lies within an incorporated place.

CDPs are treated in the same way as incorporated entities and appear in the same category of census data as incorporated places. This distinguishes CDPs from other census classifications, such as minor civil divisions (MCDs), which are in a separate category.

The population and demographics of the CDP are included in the data of county subdivisions containing the CDP. Generally, a CDP shall not be defined within the boundaries of what the Census Bureau regards to be an incorporated city, village or borough. However, the Census Bureau considers some towns in New England states, New Jersey and New York as well as townships in some other states as MCDs, even though they are incorporated municipalities in those states. In such states, CDPs may be defined within such towns or spanning the boundaries of multiple towns.

== Purpose ==
There are a number of reasons for the CDP designation:

- The area may be more urban than its surroundings, having a concentration of population with a definite residential nucleus, such as Whitmore Lake, Michigan; Hershey, Pennsylvania; Metairie, Louisiana; and The Villages, Florida (the latter CDP covering only a portion of the overall community).
- A formerly incorporated place may disincorporate or be partly annexed by a neighboring town, but the former town or a part of it may still be reported by the census as a CDP by meeting criteria for a CDP. Examples are the former village of Covedale (village in Ohio), compared with Covedale (CDP), Ohio, or the former village of Seneca Falls (CDP), New York, disincorporated in 2011.
- The area may contain an easily recognizable institution, usually occupying a large land area, with an identity distinct from the surrounding community. This could apply to some college campuses and large military bases (or parts of a military base) that are not within the limits of any existing community, such as Notre Dame, Indiana; Stanford, California (which houses the academic core of the Stanford University campus); (Note: The Stanford campus also includes areas within the incorporated cities of Menlo Park, Palo Alto, Portola Valley, and Woodside, as well as parts of unincorporated San Mateo County outside the Stanford CDP.) Fort Campbell North, Kentucky; and Fort Leonard Wood, Missouri.
- In other cases, the boundary of an incorporated place may bisect a recognized community. An example of this is Bostonia, California, which straddles the city limits of El Cajon. The USGS places the nucleus of Bostonia within El Cajon. The Bostonia CDP covers the greater El Cajon area in unincorporated San Diego County that is generally north of that part of Bostonia within El Cajon.
- In some states, a CDP may be defined within an incorporated municipality that (for the purposes of the census) is regarded as a minor civil division. For example, all towns in New England are incorporated municipalities, but may also include both rural and urban areas. CDPs may be defined to describe urbanized areas within such municipalities, as in the case of North Amherst, Massachusetts.
- Hawaii is the only state that has no incorporated places recognized by the U.S. Census Bureau below the county level. All data for places in Hawaii reported by the census are CDPs.
- A few CDPs represent an aggregation of several nearby communities - for example, Shorewood–Tower Hills–Harbert, Michigan, or Egypt Lake-Leto, Florida. However, the Census Bureau discontinued this method for most CDPs during the 2010 census.
- In rare cases, a CDP was also defined for the urbanized area surrounding an incorporated municipality, but which is outside the municipal boundaries, for example, Greater Galesburg, Michigan, or Greater Upper Marlboro, Maryland. This practice was discontinued in 2010.
- In some states, the Census Bureau designates entire minor civil divisions (MCD) with an urban or suburban character as CDPs. Examples include West Bloomfield Township, Michigan (now listed as a Charter township) or Reading, Massachusetts (listed as a New England town and as a CDP). Such designations were used in states where the MCDs function with strong governmental authority and provide services equivalent to an incorporated municipality (New England, New York, New Jersey, Pennsylvania, Michigan, Minnesota, and Wisconsin). MCDs appear in a separate category in census data from places (i.e., incorporated places and CDPs); however, when MCDs strongly resemble incorporated places, CDPs coterminous with the MCDs are defined so that such places appear in both categories of census data.

== Criteria ==
Census Bureau criteria and guidelines specify that CDPs:

- Constitute a single, named, contiguous geographic area containing a mix of residential, nonresidential, and commercial uses. Some predominantly residential communities may also be recognized as CDPs.
- Cannot be partially or entirely within an incorporated place or another CDP.
- Can be located in more than one county but cannot cross state boundaries.
- Contain at least some population or housing units. The Census Bureau may request a justification for CDPs delineated with fewer than ten housing units.
- May not have the same name as an adjacent or nearby incorporated place. Adding a directional to the name to differentiate is not acceptable if that name is not in local use.
- Can have a name change if the new name provides a better identification of the community.
- Boundaries should follow visible features such as roads, rivers, railroads, or nonvisible features such as parcel boundaries, adjacent incorporated place boundaries, or other Census Bureau geographies (e.g., school district boundaries, block group boundaries, etc.).

== See also ==
- Census county division
- Census town – similar classification in India and Ireland
- Designated place – counterpart in the Canadian census
- Incorporated place
- Unincorporated area
- Populated place – used by the United States Board on Geographic Names
- ZIP Code Tabulation Area
