= Our Lady of the Visitation School =

Private Catholic grade-school in Cincinnati, Ohio

Location
- Cincinnati, Ohio, United States
- Coordinates: 39°08′44″N 84°40′08″W

Information
- Type: Catholic, Private, Co-ed
- Motto: "There are Different Gifts but the Same Spirit"
- Established: 1949
- School district: Roman Catholic Archdiocese of Cincinnati
- Principal: Holly Aug
- Faculty: 70+
- Grades: Preschool–8
- Enrollment: 773
- Colors: Orange and Blue
- Athletics: baseball, basketball, football, lacrosse, golf, soccer, softball, tennis, track & field, and volleyball
- Athletics conference: Varies for each sport
- Mascot: Viking
- Affiliation: Roman Catholic, NCEA
- Website: www.olvisitation.org/school

Our Lady of the Visitation School is a large Catholic grade-school in Cincinnati, Ohio. The school won the 2007 Blue Ribbon Schools Competition. The school's name is often shortened to "Visi".

== Academics ==
The school has grades Preschool-8. Academic excellence is Visitation’s commitment to all of its students. Student learning is the focus of Visitation’s curriculum. High expectations are the standard, and Visitation students excel within the classroom and outside of the classroom in all curricular areas. Visitation’s academic program gets results because it is focused on learning! The school has one library/STEM lab, one art room, two gyms, two music rooms, and one large computer lab.

=== Blue-Ribbon Schools ===
Visitation won the 2007 Blue Ribbon Schools Competition. The Blue Ribbon award is considered to be the highest honor that an American school can achieve. Any school in the U.S. can enter.

== Extracurricular ==
=== Athletics ===
Visitation's mascot is a Viking and teams are normally nicknamed the "Visi Vikings". Visitation offers many sports for all grades. In-school activities include Field Day and an 8th Grade Volleyball game. Field Day is a day-long event in which students from each grade compete in different activities.

Our Lady of the Visitation has sports for every grade level including baseball, basketball, cheer, football, golf, soccer, softball, track & field, volleyball, and wrestling.

=== Community service ===
From Preschool - grade 8, there are opportunities for community service. Each grade is in charge of a service project for the month, in which the entire school participates in. Students raise money for charities, give gifts to those less fortunate, and many other things. The older the students are, the more responsibility they have. Eighth graders have a group known as E.G.O.(Eighth Grade Organization) which is in charge of many community service activities the school does. A.C.T.S.(Association of Catholic Teen Services) is a program that eighth graders can join which travels around the community doing acts of community service, such as visiting nursing homes, tutoring under privileged children, and many other things.

=== A Green School ===
Visitation always has worked to be energy efficient. Whether using fluorescent light bubbles or reusable materials in the cafeteria. Most recently, as part of a school project, a portion of the school's roof became a garden.

== Families ==
"Families" is an in-school program, started in 2005, that pairs members of each grade together for one school year. The eighth grade student in each family acts as the leader. "Families" participate in activities throughout the year such as making valentines for the elderly, creating things to hang up around the school, and simply have fun.

== 70th Anniversary ==
Our Lady of the Visitation School celebrated its 70th anniversary in 2019. The parish started in 1946 as a small church, and the school started in 1949. The school has had many additions since 1949. The church, originally, was a converted army barracks. When the parish began growing rapidly a new church was planned. That church is still in use today but has since been expanded.

== Extra ==
- Visitation also has a large cafeteria which serves hot lunch every day.
- Visitation has an auditorium which is complete with a large stage as big or bigger than some high-school stages.
- Visitation's "VisiFest" is one of the largest parish festivals on the westside of Cincinnati.
