= Brian Koelling =

American baseball player (born 1969)

- Infielder
- Born: June 11, 1969 (age 57); Cincinnati, Ohio, U.S.
- Batted: Right Threw: Right

MLB debut
- August 21, 1993, for the Cincinnati Reds

Last MLB appearance
- September 3, 1993, for the Cincinnati Reds

MLB statistics
- Games played: 7
- Batting average: .067
- Runs scored: 2
- Stats at Baseball Reference

Teams
- Cincinnati Reds (1993)

Brian Wayne Koelling (born June 11, 1969) is a former Major League Baseball player who played seven games for the Cincinnati Reds in 1993. He was drafted by the Reds in the 14th round of the 1991 amateur draft.

== Early life and amateur career ==
Koelling was initially raised in Delhi, Ohio. His mother was a teacher and his father was a pipefitter. As a child, he moved to Miami Heights, Ohio. He attended Taylor High School where he played baseball and football as a quarterback. After high school, he first enrolled at Ohio State where he planned to walk on to the football team. He had gone so far as making a tuition payment and being assigned a dorm room before choosing instead to play college baseball as a shortstop at Bowling Green.

== Professional career ==
Koelling was drafted by the Cincinnati Reds in the 14th round of the 1991 Major League Baseball draft. He began his professional career with the Billings Mustangs where he hit .353 before being promoted to Cedar Rapids. As a minor leaguer, Koelling had to transition from shortstop to second base because he was blocked at shortstop by both Barry Larkin and Pokey Reese. Koelling made his Major League debut on August 21, 1993 against the Montreal Expos at Riverfront Stadium; he started at second base and led off but was hitless in three at bats against Butch Henry. On August 23, Dwight Gooden of the New York Mets hit Koelling in the back with a pitch. Koelling would eventually come around to score the first of only two runs of his Major League career. Gooden was later suspended three games for the beanball. Koelling next played two days later against the Mets at Shea Stadium and recorded the only hit of his Major League career, a second inning single off of Eric Hillman. His final Major League game came on September 3, 1993 against the Philadelphia Phillies in Cincinnati. He pinch hit for Kevin Wickander in the fifth inning but was retired on three pitches by Tommy Greene. On September 5, he was returned to the minor leagues.

Prior to the 1994 season, the Reds signed Koelling to a one-year contract. Although Koelling was called up to the Major League roster in September, he did not appear in a game.

On August 8, 1995, Koelling was traded to the Philadelphia Phillies for Mariano Duncan.

His final season in professional baseball came in 1997 with the Chattanooga Lookouts in the Double-A Southern League.

== Personal life ==
Koelling earned a bachelor's degree in political science from Northern Kentucky University. He has two sons, Kyle, Tyler, Lauren, Carson, and Kylie with his wife, Jenny.

In 2018, Koelling was as an assistant baseball coach at East Central High School in St. Leon, Indiana.
