= Mack, Ohio =

- Census-designated place
- Location in Hamilton County and the state of Ohio
- Coordinates: 39°08′28″N 84°40′52″W
- Country: United States
- State: Ohio
- County: Hamilton

Area
  - Total: 8.91 sq mi (23.07 km^{2})
  - Land: 8.91 sq mi (23.07 km^{2})
  - Water: 0 sq mi (0.00 km^{2})
- Elevation: 830 ft (250 m)

Population (2020)
  - Total: 11,088
  - Density: 1,244.6/sq mi (480.55/km^{2})
- Time zone: UTC-5 (Eastern (EST))
  - Summer (DST): UTC-4 (EDT)
- ZIP code: 45211, 45248
- FIPS code: 39-46088
- GNIS feature ID: 2585512

Mack is a census-designated place (CDP) in Green and Miami townships, Hamilton County, Ohio, United States. The population was 11,088 at the 2020 census. At prior censuses, the community was listed as two separate CDPs, Mack North and Mack South.

== History ==
Mack was originally known as Dry Ridge in the 19th century. It was renamed after Andrew Mack, a local politician.

== Geography ==
Mack is located 10 miles (16 km) northwest of downtown Cincinnati. Ohio State Route 264 (Bridgetown Road) is the main road through the community, running east into Bridgetown and west to Cleves. Its neighbors are Bridgetown to the east, Covedale to the southeast, Delhi Township to the south, Addyston to the southwest, and North Bend and Miami Heights to the west.

According to the United States Census Bureau, the CDP has a total area of 9.3 square miles (24.0 km^{2}), all land.

== Demographics ==
=== 2020 census ===
As of the 2020 census, Mack had a population of 11,088, for a population density of 1,244.58 people per square mile (480.55/km^{2}). There were 4,074 housing units, of which 2.3% were vacant. The homeowner vacancy rate was 1.0% and the rental vacancy rate was 3.3%.

There were 3,982 households in Mack, of which 31.7% had children under the age of 18 living in them. Of all households, 72.2% were married-couple households, 9.5% were households with a male householder and no spouse or partner present, and 14.3% were households with a female householder and no spouse or partner present. About 15.0% of all households were made up of individuals and 9.1% had someone living alone who was 65 years of age or older. The average household size was 2.79, and the average family size was 3.20.

The median age was 44.9 years. 22.6% of residents were under the age of 18 and 20.2% of residents were 65 years of age or older. For every 100 females there were 101.1 males, and for every 100 females age 18 and over there were 99.7 males age 18 and over.

100.0% of residents lived in urban areas, while 0.0% lived in rural areas.

Racial composition as of the 2020 census
Race	Number	Percent
White	10,560	95.2%
Black or African American	89	0.8%
American Indian and Alaska Native	4	0.0%
Asian	60	0.5%
Native Hawaiian and Other Pacific Islander	3	0.0%
Some other race	35	0.3%
Two or more races	337	3.0%
Hispanic or Latino (of any race)	113	1.0%

=== Income and poverty ===
According to the U.S. Census American Community Survey, for the period 2016-2020 the estimated median annual income for a household in the CDP was $109,946, and the median income for a family was $112,479. About 2.3% of the population were living below the poverty line, including 2.3% of those under age 18 and 3.5% of those age 65 or over. About 65.1% of the population were employed, and 37.8% had a bachelor's degree or higher.

== Education ==
Oak Hills School District operates public schools. Springmyer Elementary School and John F. Dulles Elementary School are in Mack.

Public Library of Cincinnati and Hamilton County operates the Green Township Branch in Mack. The branch, which opened in January 1990, has a central copper dome with two smaller domed structures, which were designed to resemble the barns of horse farms which at one time were prevalent in Green Township.
