= Shawnee, Hamilton County, Ohio =

Shawnee, Ohio
- Census-designated place
- Location in Hamilton County and the state of Ohio
- Coordinates: 39°07′39″N 84°47′45″W
- Country: United States
- State: Ohio
- County: Hamilton

Area
  - Total: 6.94 sq mi (17.97 km^{2})
  - Land: 6.42 sq mi (16.62 km^{2})
  - Water: 0.53 sq mi (1.36 km^{2})
- Elevation: 614 ft (187 m)

Population (2020)
  - Total: 747
  - Density: 116.4/sq mi (44.95/km^{2})
- Time zone: UTC-5 (Eastern (EST))
  - Summer (DST): UTC-4 (EDT)
- FIPS code: 39-71958
- GNIS feature ID: 2585526

Shawnee is a census-designated place (CDP) in Miami Township, Hamilton County, Ohio, United States, 21 miles (34 km) west of downtown Cincinnati. The population of Shawnee was 747 at the 2020 census.

== Geography ==
Shawnee is located in the southwest corner of the state of Ohio, occupying the land between the Ohio and Great Miami rivers. To the south is Boone County, Kentucky, and to the west is Dearborn County, Indiana. To the north, across the Great Miami River, is Whitewater Township, and to the east are the villages of Cleves and North Bend. Much of the central heights of the CDP are taken up by Shawnee Lookout County Park. The area is also home to the Shawnee Lookout Archeological District.

According to the United States Census Bureau, the CDP has a total area of 6.9 square miles (18.0 km^{2}), of which 6.4 square miles (16.6 km^{2}) is land and 0.54 square miles (1.4 km^{2}), or 7.63%, is water, consisting mainly of the Ohio and Great Miami rivers.

== Demographics ==
Historical population
Census	Pop.	Note	%±
2020	747		—
U.S. Decennial Census

As of the census of 2020, there were 747 people living in the CDP, for a population density of 116.41 people per square mile (44.95/km^{2}). There were 307 housing units. The racial makeup of the CDP was 94.4% White, 1.1% Black or African American, 0.5% Native American, 0.1% Asian, 0.0% Pacific Islander, 0.5% from some other race, and 3.3% from two or more races. 0.5% of the population were Hispanic or Latino of any race.

There were 325 households, out of which 33.5% had children under the age of 18 living with them, 46.2% were married couples living together, 9.8% had a male householder with no spouse present, and 44.0% had a female householder with no spouse present. 19.3% of all households were made up of individuals, and 11.0% were someone living alone who was 65 years of age or older. The average household size was 3.22, and the average family size was 3.70.

22.7% of the CDP's population were under the age of 18, 70.7% were 18 to 64, and 6.6% were 65 years of age or older. The median age was 51.9. For every 100 females, there were 54.5 males.

According to the U.S. Census American Community Survey, for the period 2016-2020 the estimated median annual income for a household in the CDP was $137,704, and the median income for a family was $138,560. About 1.4% of the population were living below the poverty line, including 0.0% of those under age 18 and 21.7% of those age 65 or over. About 53.0% of the population were employed, and 15.1% had a bachelor's degree or higher.
