= Shawnee Lookout Archeological District =

Archaeological site in Ohio, United States

- U.S. National Register of Historic Places
- U.S. Historic district
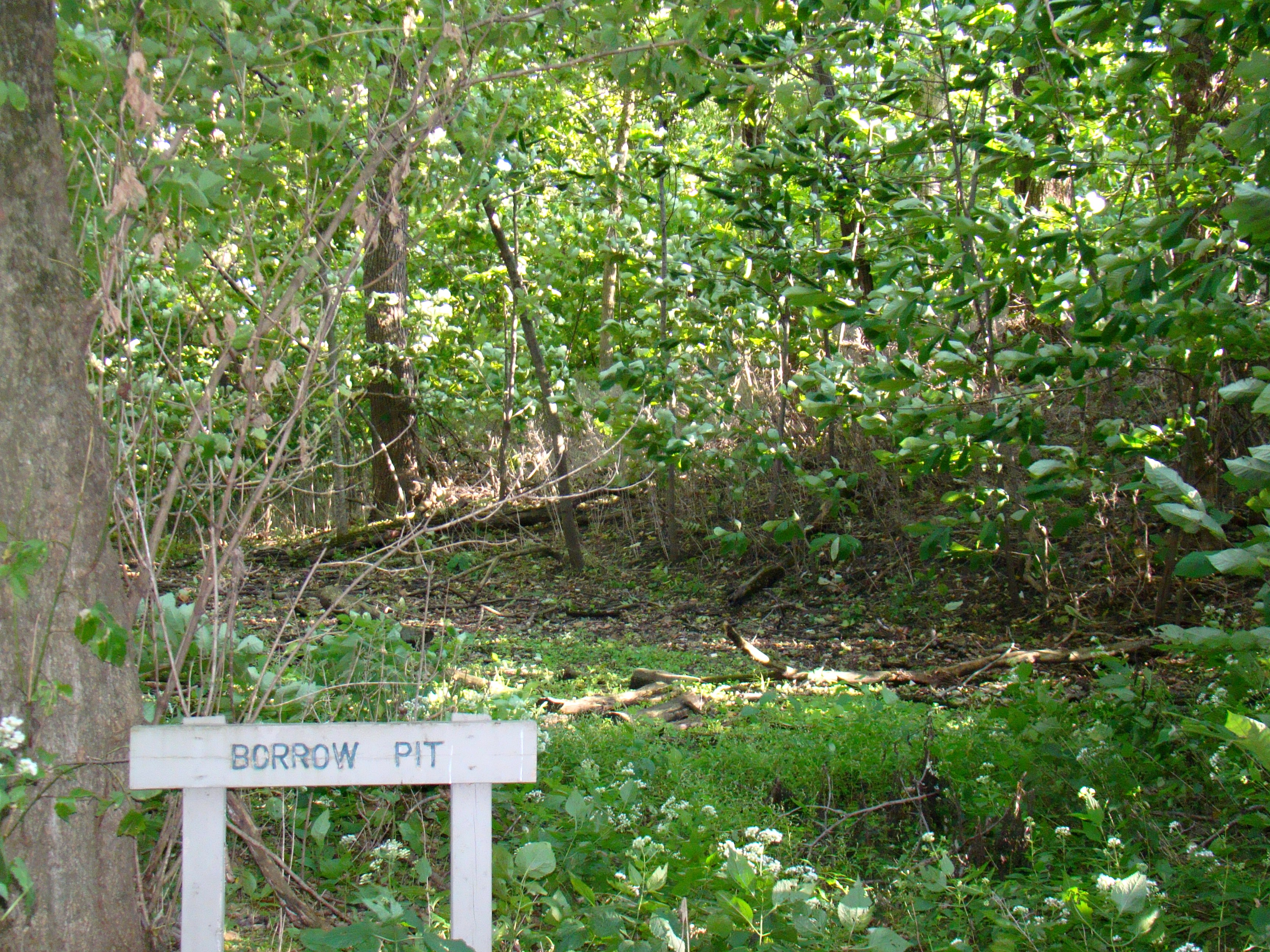
- Miami Fort

- Location within Ohio Location within the United States
- Location: In Shawnee Lookout, southwest of Cleves
- Nearest city: Cleves, Ohio
- Coordinates: 39°7′34″N 84°47′58″W
- Area: 2,000 acres (810 ha)
- NRHP reference No.: 74001516
- Added to NRHP: December 2, 1974

The Shawnee Lookout Archeological District is a historic district in the southwestern corner of the U.S. state of Ohio. Located southwest of Cleves in Hamilton County's Miami Township, the district is composed of forty-six archaeological sites spread out over an area of 2,000 acres (810 ha). Thirty-four of these sites are located in the 1,000-acre (400 ha) Shawnee Lookout Park, which has been called one of the most beautiful parks in southwestern Ohio.

Burial mound at Shawnee Lookout, Hamilton County, Ohio. CC0 photograph by the Public Lands Institute.

The combination of river bottoms and wooded hillsides in Shawnee Lookout made it a highly attractive site for prehistoric settlement. As a result, the lands included in the district have a long record of aboriginal residency: artifacts found in the district's sites span a range of ten thousand years. These artifacts represent many cultures, including various Archaic peoples, the Hopewell tradition, and other Woodland period peoples. Among the artifacts found at one of the sites are a wide range of biological remains, such as bird bones, fish bones, walnuts, turtle shells, and deer bones. In recognition of the archaeological value of the sites composing the district, Shawnee Lookout was listed on the National Register of Historic Places in 1974.
