= Grandview, Hamilton County, Ohio =

Grandview, Ohio
- Census-designated place
- Location in Hamilton County and the state of Ohio.
- Coordinates: 39°11′40″N 84°44′20″W
- Country: United States
- State: Ohio
- County: Hamilton

Area
  - Total: 4.64 sq mi (12.02 km^{2})
  - Land: 4.34 sq mi (11.25 km^{2})
  - Water: 0.30 sq mi (0.77 km^{2})
- Elevation: 725 ft (221 m)

Population (2020)
  - Total: 1,312
  - Density: 302.1/sq mi (116.63/km^{2})
- Time zone: UTC-5 (Eastern (EST))
  - Summer (DST): UTC-4 (EDT)
- FIPS code: 39-31262
- GNIS feature ID: 2393021

Grandview is a census-designated place (CDP) in Miami Township, Hamilton County, Ohio, United States. The population was 1,312 at the 2020 census.

== Geography ==
According to the United States Census Bureau, the CDP has a total area of 4.7 square miles (12.1 km^{2}), of which 4.4 square miles (11.3 km^{2}) is land and 0.31 square miles (0.8 km^{2}), or 6.63%, is water.

The Interstate 74 and Interstate 275 concurrency runs through the far northeast corner of Grandview, but with no exits in the community limits. East Miami River Road runs through the area as well. It goes all the way from Fairfield, Ohio to Cleves, Ohio.

The following areas are adjacent to Grandview:

To the North and West

- Whitewater Township, Hamilton County, Ohio

To the Northeast:

- Colerain Township, Hamilton County, Ohio

To the East and South:

- Miami Township, Hamilton County, Ohio

To the Southwest:

- Cleves, Ohio

== Demographics ==
Historical population
Census	Pop.	Note	%±
2020	1,312		—
U.S. Decennial Census

=== 2020 census ===
As of the census of 2020, there were 1,312 people living in the CDP, for a population density of 302.10 people per square mile (116.63/km^{2}). There were 545 housing units. The racial makeup of the CDP was 94.7% White, 0.5% Black or African American, 0.0% Native American, 0.5% Asian, 0.0% Pacific Islander, 0.1% from some other race, and 4.3% from two or more races. 0.2% of the population were Hispanic or Latino of any race.

There were 347 households, out of which 51.6% had children under the age of 18 living with them, 68.0% were married couples living together, 19.0% had a male householder with no spouse present, and 7.5% had a female householder with no spouse present. 21.0% of all households were made up of individuals, and 2.0% were someone living alone who was 65 years of age or older. The average household size was 3.23, and the average family size was 3.67.

28.9% of the CDP's population were under the age of 18, 65.6% were 18 to 64, and 5.5% were 65 years of age or older. The median age was 38.8. For every 100 females, there were 89.2 males.

According to the U.S. Census American Community Survey, for the period 2016-2020 the estimated median annual income for a household in the CDP was $141,776, and the median income for a family was $168,854. About 3.7% of the population were living below the poverty line, including 0.0% of those under age 18 and 0.0% of those age 65 or over. About 62.7% of the population were employed, and 47.6% had a bachelor's degree or higher.

=== 2000 census ===
As of the census of 2000, there were 1,391 people, 494 households, and 375 families residing in the CDP. The population density was 319.3 inhabitants per square mile (123.3/km^{2}). There were 535 housing units at an average density of 122.8 per square mile (47.4/km^{2}). The racial makeup of the CDP was 98.35% White, 0.07% African American, 0.22% Native American, 0.29% Asian, 0.22% from other races, and 0.86% from two or more races. Hispanic or Latino of any race were 0.22% of the population.

There were 494 households, out of which 37.0% had children under the age of 18 living with them, 62.3% were married couples living together, 9.9% had a female householder with no husband present, and 23.9% were non-families. 19.4% of all households were made up of individuals, and 8.5% had someone living alone who was 65 years of age or older. The average household size was 2.82 and the average family size was 3.25.

In the CDP, the population was spread out, with 30.1% under the age of 18, 6.4% from 18 to 24, 31.3% from 25 to 44, 22.3% from 45 to 64, and 9.9% who were 65 years of age or older. The median age was 36 years. For every 100 females, there were 108.5 males. For every 100 females age 18 and over, there were 108.4 males.

The median income for a household in the CDP was $33,984, and the median income for a family was $39,917. Males had a median income of $34,167 versus $21,435 for females. The per capita income for the CDP was $17,292. About 10.9% of families and 14.9% of the population were below the poverty line, including 15.4% of those under age 18 and 13.9% of those age 65 or over.

== Recreation ==
Mitchell Memorial Forest, part of the Great Parks of Hamilton County, is located in Grandview and makes up a good portion of the CDP.

Grandview is also home to the Edgewater Sports Park which is a drag racing track. The race track is a part of the NHRA and is the only track of its kind in Hamilton County, Ohio and one of only two in the Cincinnati Metropolitan Area.

== Education ==
Grandview has no schools in the community limits. However, it is a part of the Three Rivers School District (North Bend, Ohio). Taylor High School (North Bend, Ohio) is located immediately south of Grandview. St Bernard- Taylor Creek is a Catholic middle school in the area.
