= Miami Heights, Ohio =

- Census-designated place
- Location in Hamilton County and the state of Ohio
- Coordinates: 39°10′04″N 84°42′55″W
- Country: United States
- State: Ohio
- County: Hamilton

Area
  - Total: 3.84 sq mi (9.94 km^{2})
  - Land: 3.84 sq mi (9.94 km^{2})
  - Water: 0 sq mi (0.00 km^{2})
- Elevation: 784 ft (239 m)

Population (2020)
  - Total: 5,166
  - Density: 1,346.0/sq mi (519.68/km^{2})
- Time zone: UTC-5 (Eastern (EST))
  - Summer (DST): UTC-4 (EDT)
- FIPS code: 39-49420
- GNIS feature ID: 2585513

Miami Heights is a census-designated place (CDP) in Miami Township, Hamilton County, Ohio, United States. The population was 5,166 at the 2020 census.

== Geography ==
Miami Heights is located 14 miles (23 km) northwest of downtown Cincinnati. Ohio State Route 264 (Bridgetown Road) is the main road through the community, running east into Mack and Bridgetown and west into Cleves. Its neighbors are Grandview to the north, Mack to the east and south, North Bend to the southwest, and Cleves to the west.

According to the United States Census Bureau, the CDP has a total area of 3.5 square miles (9.1 km^{2}), all land.

== Demographics ==
As of the census of 2020, there were 5,166 people living in the CDP, for a population density of 1,346.01 people per square mile (519.68/km^{2}). There were 1,906 housing units. The racial makeup of the CDP was 94.9% White, 0.8% Black or African American, 0.1% Native American, 0.7% Asian, 0.0% Pacific Islander, 0.2% from some other race, and 3.2% from two or more races. 0.7% of the population were Hispanic or Latino of any race.

There were 1,828 households, out of which 26.9% had children under the age of 18 living with them, 67.6% were married couples living together, 11.6% had a male householder with no spouse present, and 16.3% had a female householder with no spouse present. 20.5% of all households were made up of individuals, and 12.2% were someone living alone who was 65 years of age or older. The average household size was 2.57, and the average family size was 3.02.

22.1% of the CDP's population were under the age of 18, 54.3% were 18 to 64, and 23.6% were 65 years of age or older. The median age was 48.1. For every 100 females, there were 94.6 males.

According to the U.S. Census American Community Survey, for the period 2016-2020 the estimated median annual income for a household in the CDP was $106,005, and the median income for a family was $114,357. About 2.3% of the population were living below the poverty line, including 0.0% of those under age 18 and 1.2% of those age 65 or over. About 62.1% of the population were employed, and 38.4% had a bachelor's degree or higher.
