= Shawnee, Ohio =

There are two communities named Shawnee in the U.S. state of Ohio:

- Shawnee, Hamilton County, Ohio, a census-designated place
- Shawnee, Perry County, Ohio, a village
