= Mack South, Ohio =

- Former CDP
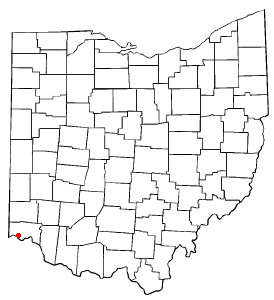
- Location of Mack South, Ohio
- Coordinates: 39°8′32″N 84°40′23″W
- Country: United States
- State: Ohio
- County: Hamilton

Area
  - Total: 3.7 sq mi (9.6 km^{2})
  - Land: 3.7 sq mi (9.6 km^{2})
  - Water: 0 sq mi (0.0 km^{2})

Population (2000)
  - Total: 5,837
  - Density: 1,579/sq mi (609.8/km^{2})
- Time zone: UTC-5 (Eastern (EST))
  - Summer (DST): UTC-4 (EDT)
- FIPS code: 39-46162

Mack South was a census-designated place (CDP) in Hamilton County, Ohio, United States. The population was 5,837 at the 2000 census. For the 2010 census, it was merged into the Mack CDP.

== Geography ==
Mack South was located at 39°8′32″N 84°40′23″W (39.142109, -84.673157).

According to the United States Census Bureau, the CDP had a total area of 3.7 square miles (9.6 km^{2}), all of it land.

== Demographics ==
As of the census of 2000, there were 5,837 people, 1,919 households, and 1,692 families residing in the CDP. The population density was 1,579.3 inhabitants per square mile (609.8/km^{2}). There were 1,948 housing units at an average density of 527.1 per square mile (203.5/km^{2}). The racial makeup of the CDP was 99.01% White, 0.03% African American, 0.09% Native American, 0.43% Asian, 0.03% Pacific Islander, 0.03% from other races, and 0.38% from two or more races. Hispanic or Latino of any race were 0.27% of the population.

There were 1,919 households, out of which 40.0% had children under the age of 18 living with them, 81.8% were married couples living together, 4.7% had a female householder with no husband present, and 11.8% were non-families. 10.4% of all households were made up of individuals, and 5.8% had someone living alone who was 65 years of age or older. The average household size was 3.04 and the average family size was 3.28.

In the CDP, the population was spread out, with 27.9% under the age of 18, 8.3% from 18 to 24, 22.4% from 25 to 44, 28.4% from 45 to 64, and 13.1% who were 65 years of age or older. The median age was 41 years. For every 100 females, there were 98.2 males. For every 100 females age 18 and over, there were 94.9 males.

The median income for a household in the CDP was $80,144, and the median income for a family was $82,970. Males had a median income of $61,739 versus $36,139 for females. The per capita income for the CDP was $30,926. None of the families and 0.4% of the population were living below the poverty line, including no under eighteens and 1.3% of those over 64.
