= Village of Addyston Historic District =

Historic district in Ohio, United States

- U.S. National Register of Historic Places
- U.S. Historic district
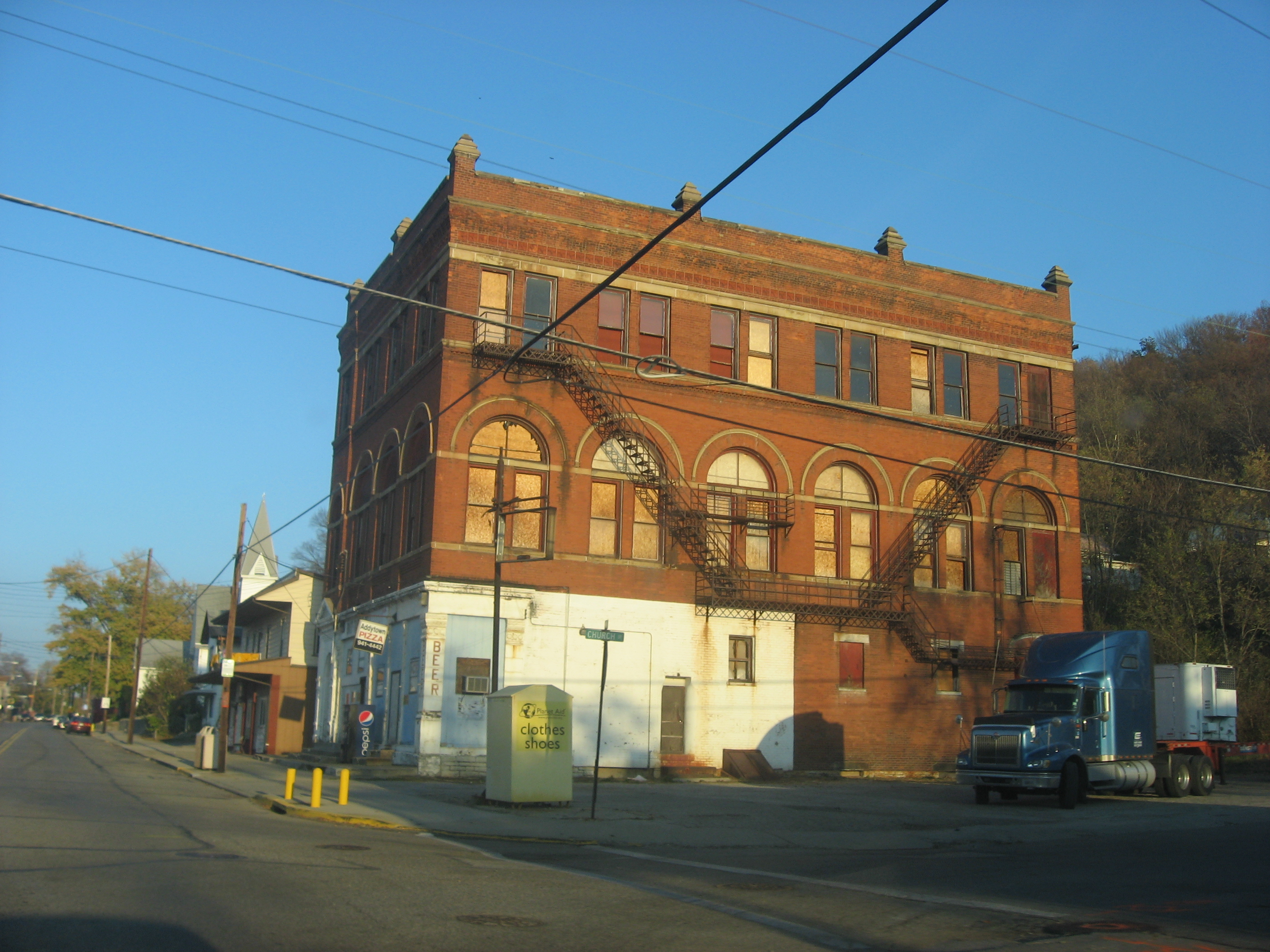
- Downtown Addyston

- Location within Ohio Location within the United States
- Location: Roughly along Main, Sekitan, Church, First and Second Sts., and Three Rivers Parkway, Addyston, Ohio
- Coordinates: 39°8′14″N 84°42′47″W
- Area: 350 acres (140 ha)
- Built: 1889
- Architectural style: Stick/Eastlake, Queen Anne
- NRHP reference No.: 91001388
- Added to NRHP: September 13, 1991

The Village of Addyston Historic District is a historic district in the village of Addyston, located along the Ohio River near Cincinnati in Hamilton County, Ohio, United States. The remnant of two company towns, the district is primarily residential in character, with only occasional examples of larger architecture.

In 1891, the unincorporated communities of Sekitan and East Addyston merged and were incorporated under the name of "Addyston". Both communities were company towns; founded in 1887, they continued to expand until about 1900. As a result of their origins, the communities' architecture (especially that of East Addyston, which was almost completely residential) was unusually homogeneous; what few distinctive buildings were built were in Sekitan, the older portion. The conceptual difference between the two portions of the village endured long after the municipal merger; separate post offices served the two portions into the 1930s, and as late as the 1960s, they were often regarded as separate communities.

Much of present-day Addyston was designated a historic district in 1991. Almost all of the village's buildings are included within its boundaries; most of the surviving residences are non-descript small vernacular houses built before 1930, with a scattering of religious, community, and commercial architecture. The majority of the non-residential buildings of all types are located in the district's western portion, where Sekitan was established. The district comprises 384 buildings; more than five out of every six buildings in the district qualified as contributing properties.
