= Winton Woods =

Park in Ohio, United States

Coordinates: 39°15′31″N 84°30′59″W

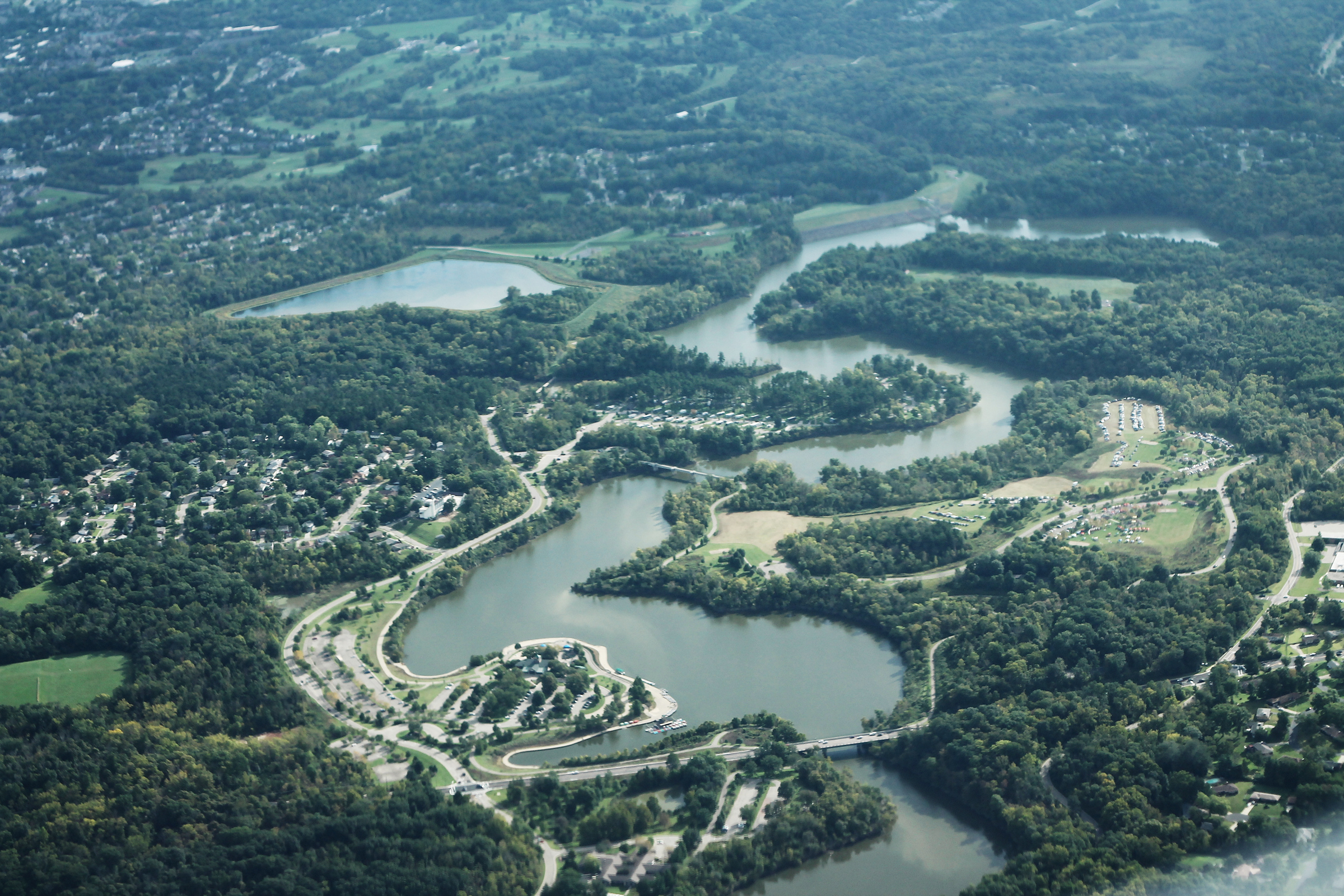
Aerial view of Winton Lake

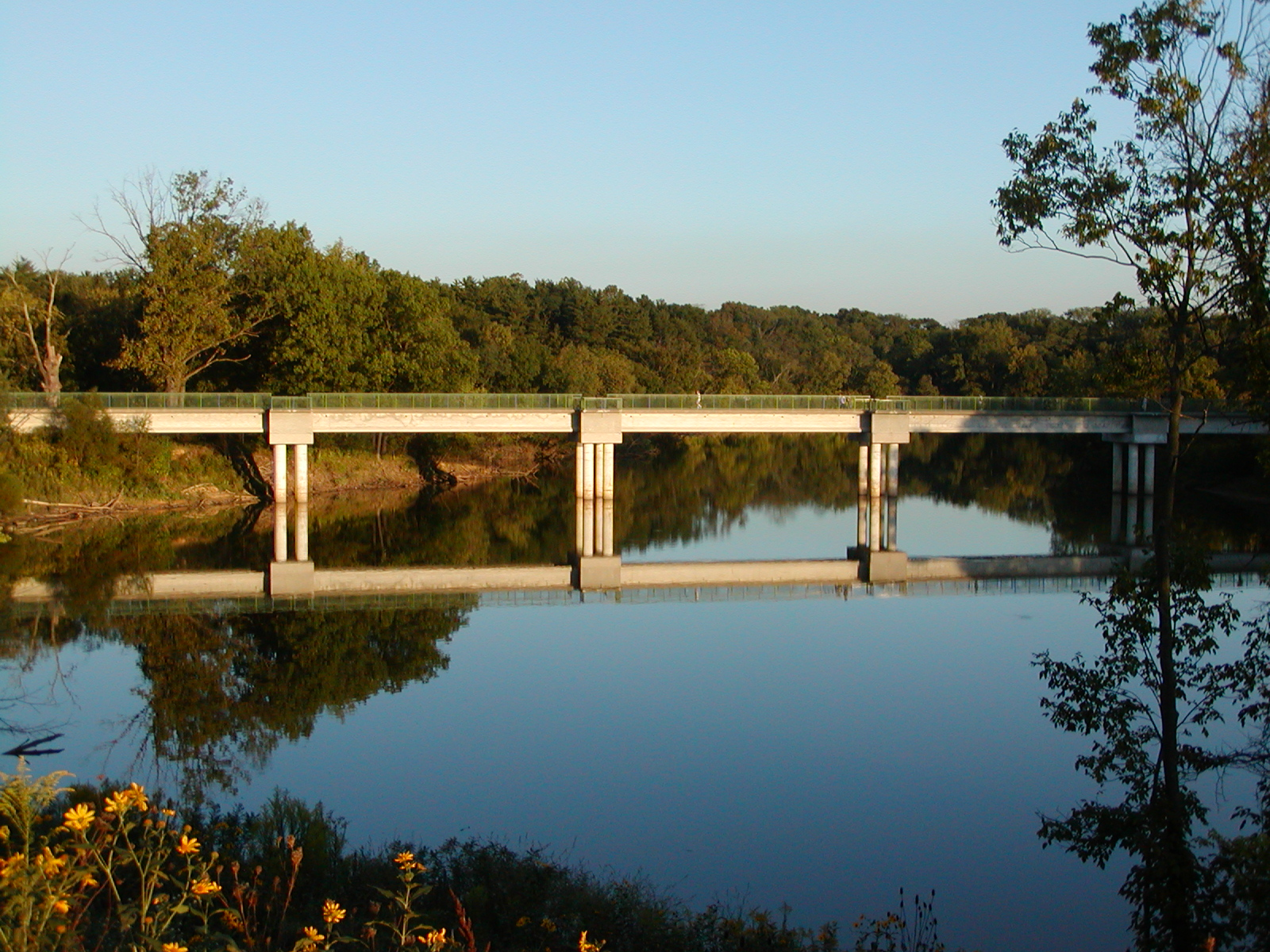
Pedestrian bridge on Winton Woods walking trail

Winton Woods is a park in Springfield Township and the village of Greenhills in the northern suburbs of Cincinnati, Ohio, United States. Winton Woods – the headquarters of the Great Parks of Hamilton County, was the second park founded in the district. The park spans more than 2,500 acres (1,000 ha) and is the second largest in the system.

The park has reservable picnic areas and shelters with Great Parks Catering available. Winton Woods also offers an 18-hole disc golf course, 2.6-miles of paved trails, a 1.1-mile Parcours fitness trail, 0.7-mile Great Oaks, a 1.1-mile long Kingfisher nature trails, basketball courts and an equestrian trail. The Possum Run Youth Camp is reservable. The park also offers full hookup and primitive campsites which holds an annual campout during the Halloween season. Also, Winton Woods has a lake, the West Fork of the Mill Creek Lake – known locally as Winton Lake, which has a harbor, boathouse, visitor center, and you can paddleboat and canoe in the lake as well.

== Website ==
www.greatparks.org
