= Miami Whitewater Forest =

Coordinates: 39.262°N 84.742°W

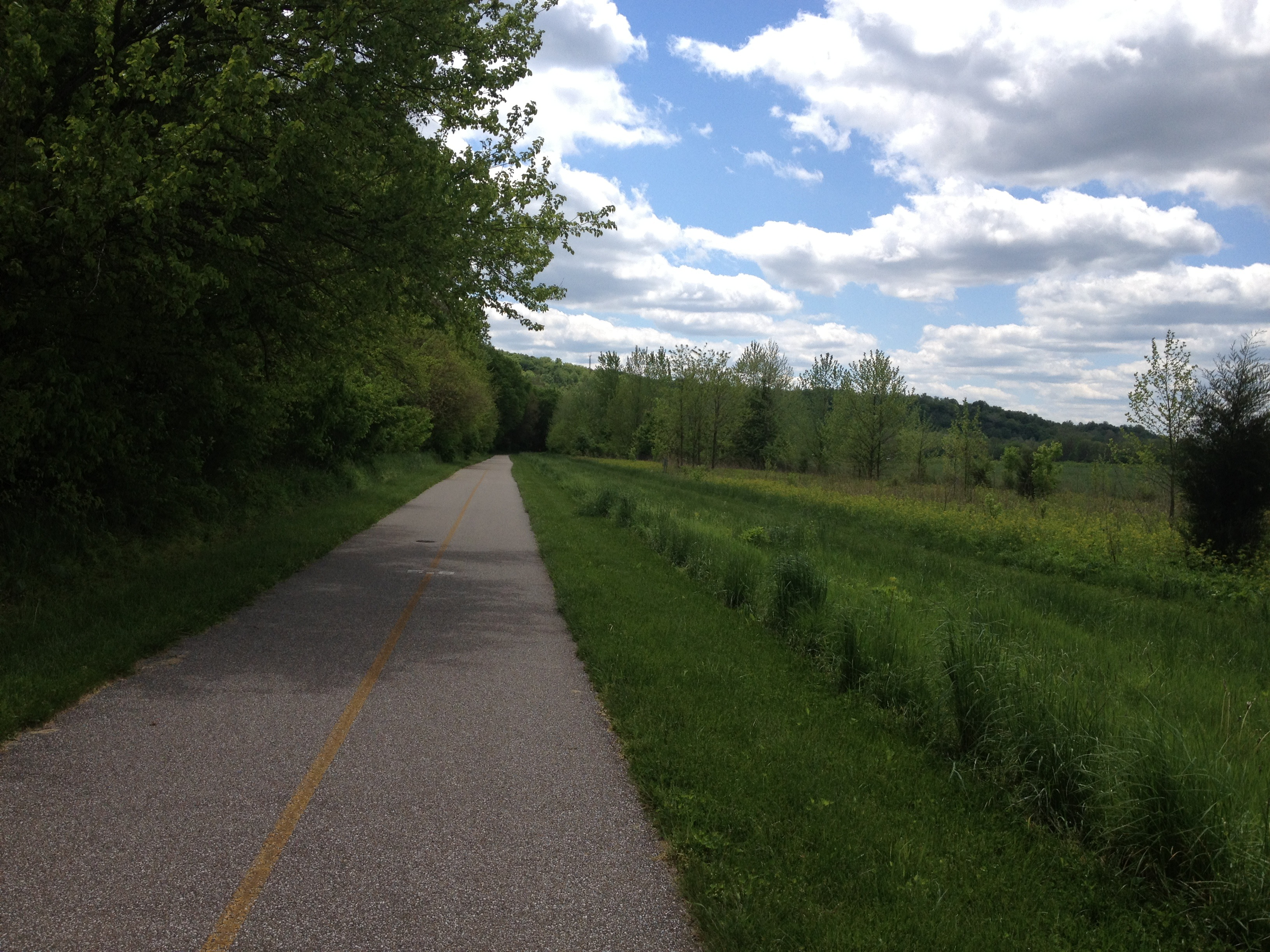
Shaker Trace trail, the longest trail in the park, allows pedestrians, bicyclist, and horseback riding.

Miami Whitewater Forest is the largest park in the Great Parks of Hamilton County with 4,345 acres (17.58 km^{2}). It is located in Hamilton County, Ohio, just northwest of Cincinnati. Included in the park are the 7.8-mile (12.6 km) paved Shaker Trace Trail as well as many other shorter trails. There is also a golf course, a 46-acre (19 ha) campground, horseback riding, and many sports offered. 46 modern campsites are available, with electric hookups and a fire pit.

In 2009 the park district spent $60,000 to build a brush recycling center at the park, and another $13,000 to build ponds for fishing bluegill.

In 2015 the Hamilton County park opened a dog park. It is the second dog park in the county park system.
