= Dana Stubblefield =

American football player (born 1970)

No. 94
- Position: Defensive tackle

Personal information
- Born: November 14, 1970 (age 55); Cleves, Ohio, U.S.
- Listed height: 6 ft 2 in (1.88 m)
- Listed weight: 290 lb (132 kg)

Career information
- High school: Taylor (North Bend, Ohio)
- College: Kansas
- NFL draft: 1993: 1st round, 26th overall pick

Career history
- San Francisco 49ers (1993–1997); Washington Redskins (1998–2000); San Francisco 49ers (2001–2002); Oakland Raiders (2003); New England Patriots (2004)*
- * Offseason or practice squad member only

Awards and highlights
- Super Bowl champion (XXIX); NFL Defensive Player of the Year (1997); NFL Defensive Rookie of the Year (1993); First-team All-Pro (1997); 2× Second-team All-Pro (1995, 1996); 3× Pro Bowl (1994, 1995, 1997); PFWA All-Rookie Team (1993); Second-team All-American (1992); 2× First-team All-Big 8 (1991, 1992)

Career NFL statistics
- Tackles: 434
- Sacks: 53.5
- Interceptions: 2
- Stats at Pro Football Reference

Dana William Stubblefield (born November 14, 1970) is an American former professional football player who was a defensive tackle in the National Football League (NFL). He played college football for the Kansas Jayhawks.

== Early life ==
After graduating from Taylor High School in North Bend, Ohio, Stubblefield attended the University of Kansas.

== Professional career ==
Pre-draft measurables
| Height | Weight | Arm length | Hand span | 40-yard dash | 10-yard split | 20-yard split | 20-yard shuttle | Vertical jump | Broad jump | Bench press |
|---|---|---|---|---|---|---|---|---|---|---|
| 6 ft 2 1/4 in (1.89 m) | 302 lb (137 kg) | 31 3/4 in (0.81 m) | 9 5/8 in (0.24 m) | 4.99 s | 1.74 s | 2.91 s | 4.74 s | 29.5 in (0.75 m) | 9 ft 1 in (2.77 m) | 22 reps |

Stubblefield was selected in the first round (26th overall) of the 1993 NFL draft by the San Francisco 49ers who went to a 4–3 defense at the start of the season. In his rookie year, Stubblefield led the 49ers with 10.5 sacks (earning himself the NFL Defensive Rookie of the Year), and recorded 8.5 the following year. He appeared in the Pro Bowl in 1994 and 1995. The 1996 season was less successful for Stubblefield, but his 1997 season found him recording 15 sacks and being named 1997's NFL Defensive Player of the Year by the Associated Press.

After the 1997 season, he became an unrestricted free agent and signed with the Washington Redskins, where his numbers greatly diminished despite the fact that he played opposite Dan Wilkinson, who often drew double-teams. He returned to San Francisco in 2001 and 2002, and played with the Oakland Raiders as a free agent in 2003. In 2004, he was signed by the New England Patriots, but he was injured and was released before the start of the season.

=== BALCO incident ===
Stubblefield's name and those of several of his Oakland Raiders team members were found on the list of clients of the Bay Area Laboratory Co-operative that had given performance-enhancing drugs to Marion Jones and others. Although initially he lied to federal investigators about using both EPO and THG, after he was charged on January 18, 2008, Stubblefield cooperated with both federal and NFL investigators and turned over the names of players, agents, and trainers that he suspected of using drugs.

Because of his cooperation with the investigation, he received a fairly light sentence after pleading guilty to lying to federal investigators on February 6, 2009. He served two years' probation.

== Personal life ==
He was formerly the varsity defensive line coach at Valley Christian High School in San Jose, California.

On October 12, 2010, former NFL agent Josh Luchs mentioned in an article for Sports Illustrated that he offered Stubblefield $10,000 cash while he was still playing football at the University of Kansas, but Stubblefield refused to accept it.

=== Legal problems ===
On December 9, 2010, San Francisco U.S. District Court judge Susan Illston sentenced Stubblefield to 90 days in jail for stealing his ex-girlfriend's mail by way of fraudulent submission of a change-of-address form.

On May 2, 2016, he was charged with sexually assaulting a disabled woman, who at the time of the incident was 31 years old. The incident occurred April 9, 2015. Stubblefield originally contacted her through a babysitter website. On July 27, 2020, Stubblefield was convicted of rape and on October 22, 2020, was sentenced to 15 years to life in prison. In December 2024, a court overturned Stubblefield's conviction on appeal, as the prosecution was found to be in violation of the California Racial Justice Act of 2020, which forbids racially biased language and rhetoric from cases made by prosecutors.
