= Great Parks of Hamilton County =

- Type: Public county park district
- Location: Hamilton County, Ohio, United States
- Created: 1930
- Operator: Hamilton County Park Board
- Open: All year

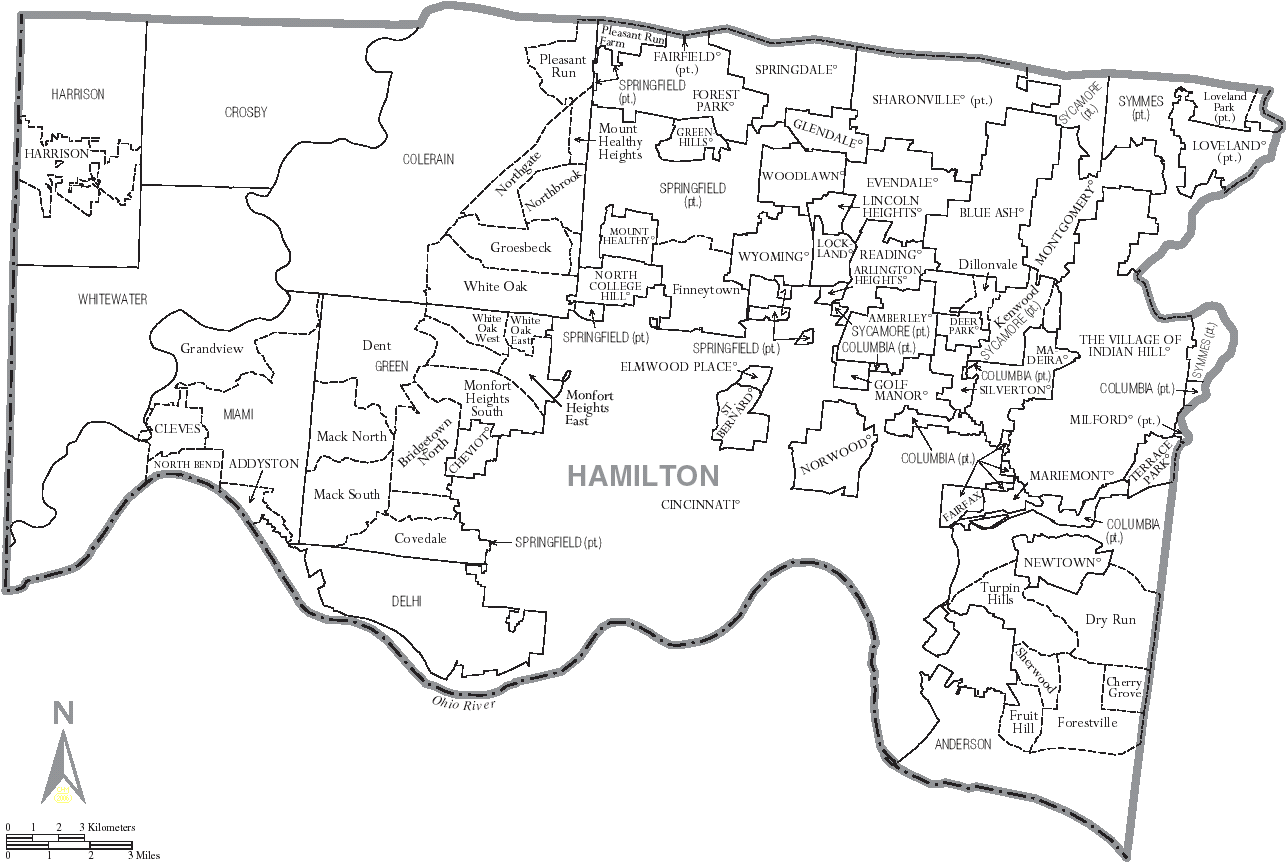
Map of Hamilton County, with municipal and township labels

Great Parks of Hamilton County is the park district of Hamilton County, Ohio, United States. It was established in 1930, opening its first park, Sharon Woods, in 1932. It was known as the Hamilton County Park District until 2014. The Great Parks system includes 18 Parks and 4 conservation areas. It is governed by a board of park commissioners. Park headquarters and Administrative offices are located in the second largest park in the system, Winton Woods. The county park system also coordinates with the Cincinnati Park Board.

== Amenities and activities ==
The parks are open 365 days a year, from dawn to dusk. Boathouses, golf courses, visitor centers and gift shop hours vary by season. All vehicles entering the parks must have a valid Motor Vehicle Permit ($10 annual for county residents; $16 annual for non-county residents; $5 daily county residents; $8 daily non-county residents). The Great Parks offer reserved banquet centers, lodging, shelters, weddings, and campsites. Campgrounds are only at Miami Whitewater Forest and Winton Woods. The three largest parks are Miami Whitewater Forest, Winton Woods, and Sharon Woods. Activities at a typical county park are hiking trails (nature, paved, and parcourse), picnicking, fishing, paddle boating, kayaking, canoeing, biking, riding horses, farm animals, playgrounds, golfing (at Miami Whitewater Forest, Winton Woods, Sharon Woods, Woodland Mound, and Little Miami Golf Center), frisbee golf, other sports, and nature centers. Dog parks are located at Simmonds Family Dog Park (Miami Whitewater Soccer Complex) and at Otto Armleder Memorial Park & Recreation Complex. Law enforcement services are provided by the Great Parks of Hamilton County Ranger Department, 24/7/365.

== List of parks and conservation areas ==
Parks

- Campbell Lakes Preserve
- Embshoff Woods
- Farbach-Werner Nature Preserve
- Fernbank Park*
- Francis RecreAcres
- Glenwood Gardens
- Lake Isabella
- Little Miami Golf Center (including the southern end of the Little Miami Scenic Trail)
- Miami Whitewater Forest
- Mitchell Memorial Forest
- Otto Armleder Memorial Park & Recreation Complex*
- Sharon Woods
- Shawnee Lookout
- Triple Creek
- Werk Road Property
- Winton Woods
- Withrow Nature Preserve
- Woodland Mound

Conservation areas

- Kroger Hills
- Newberry Wildlife Sanctuary
- Oak Glen Nature Preserve
- Richardson Forest Preserve

Asterisk (*) symbolizes parks that are worked through the City of Cincinnati and Hamilton County.

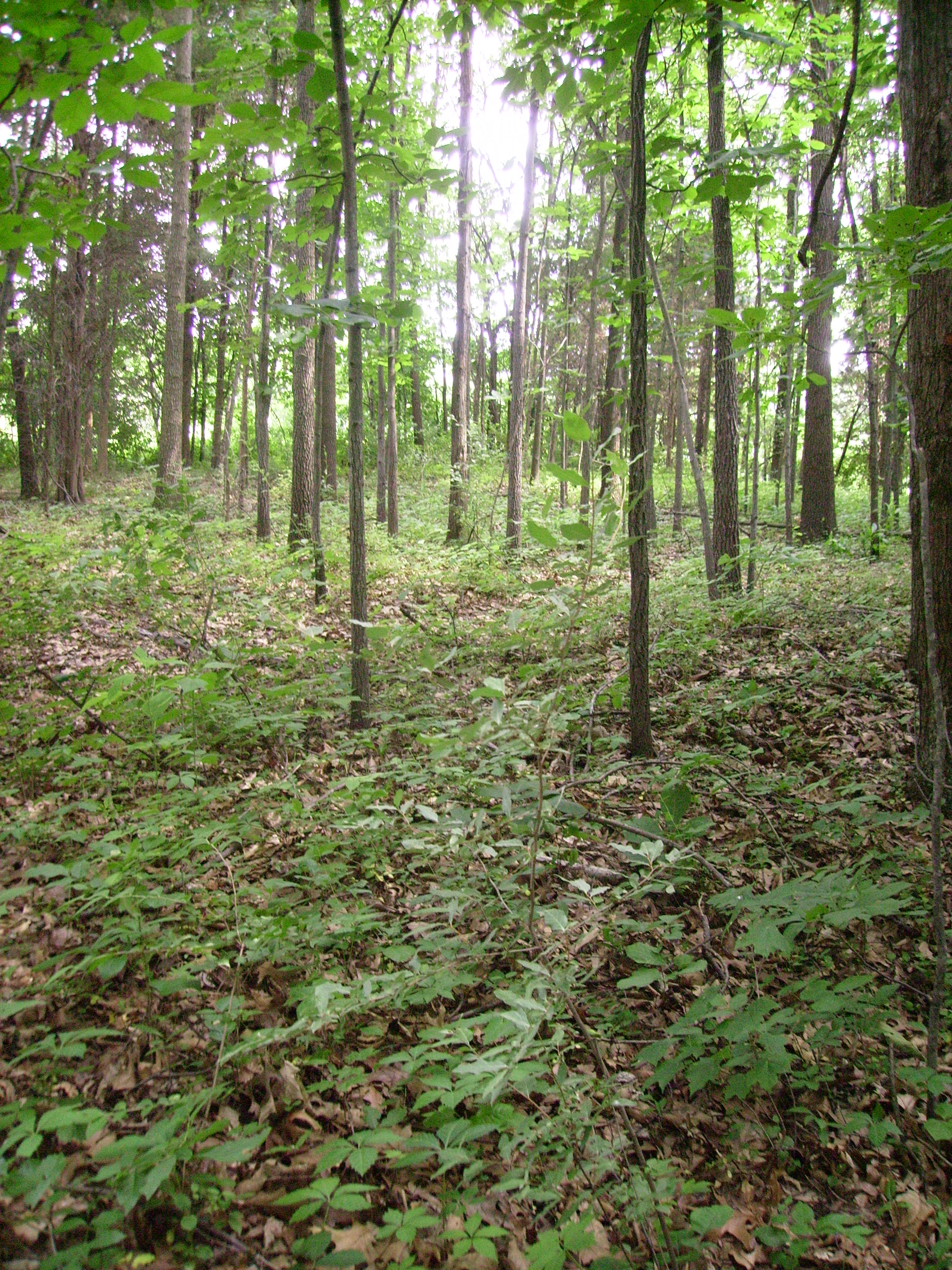
Miami Whitewater Forest

== Gallery ==
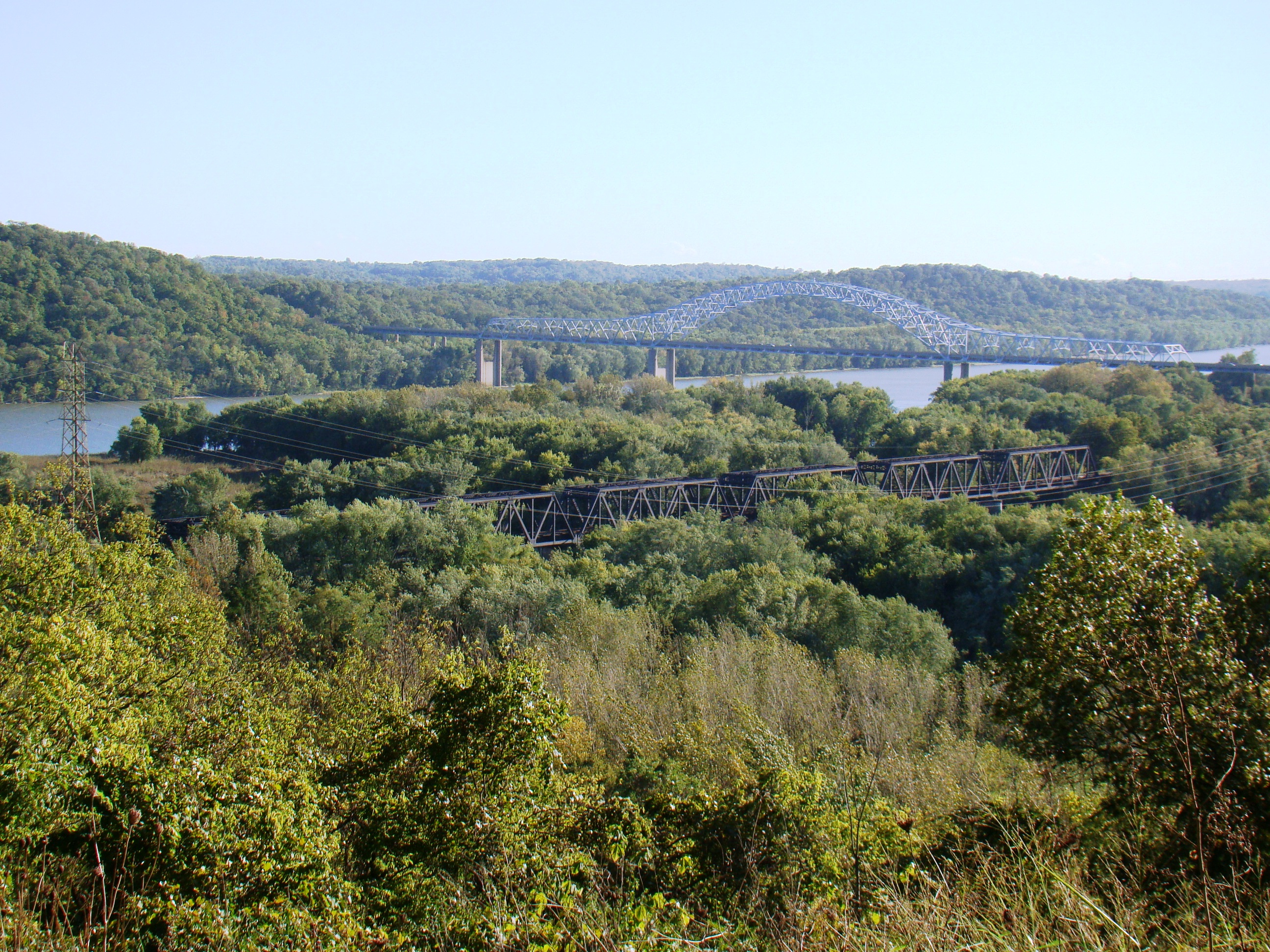
Shawnee Lookout

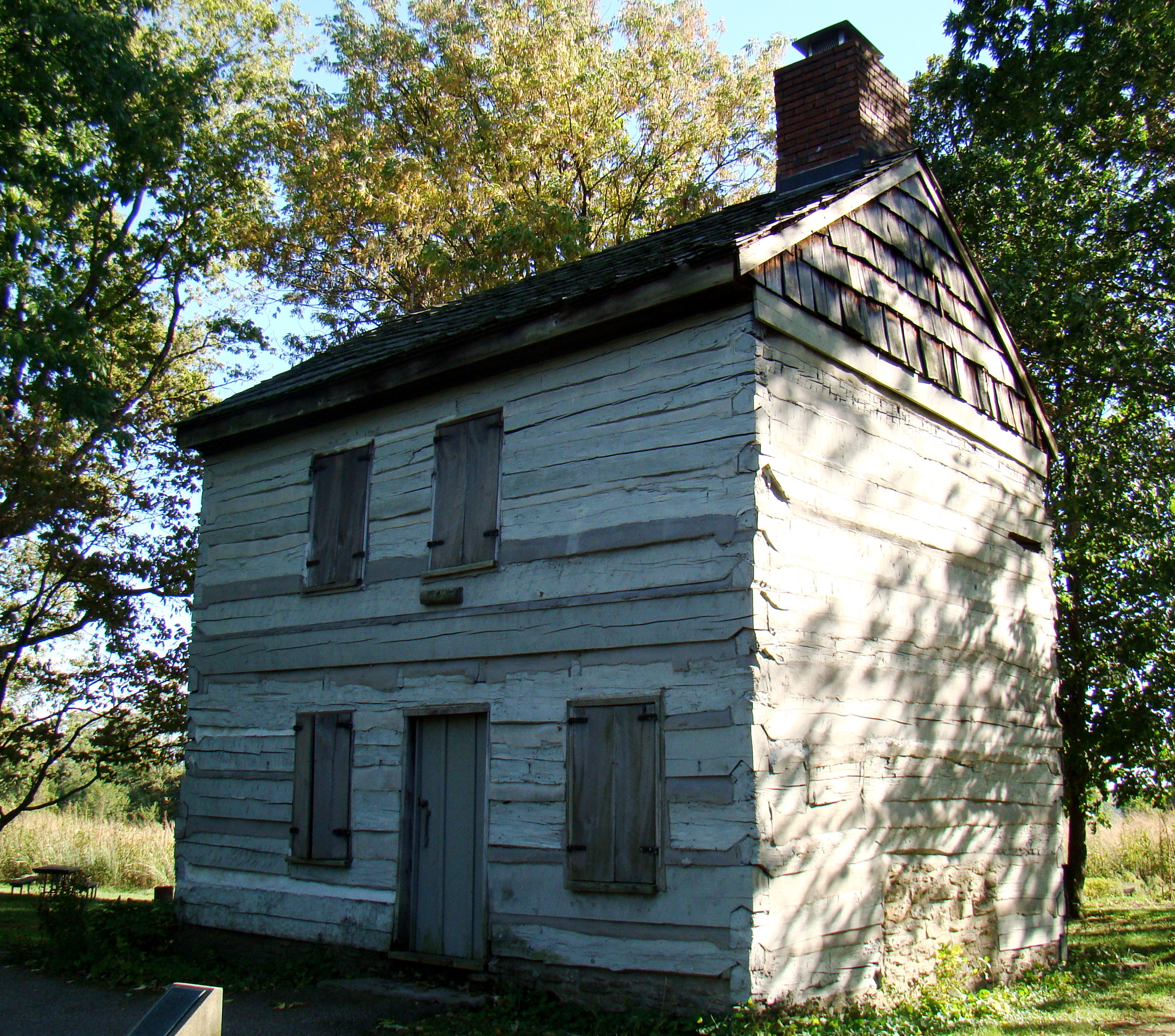
Cabin at Shawnee Lookout

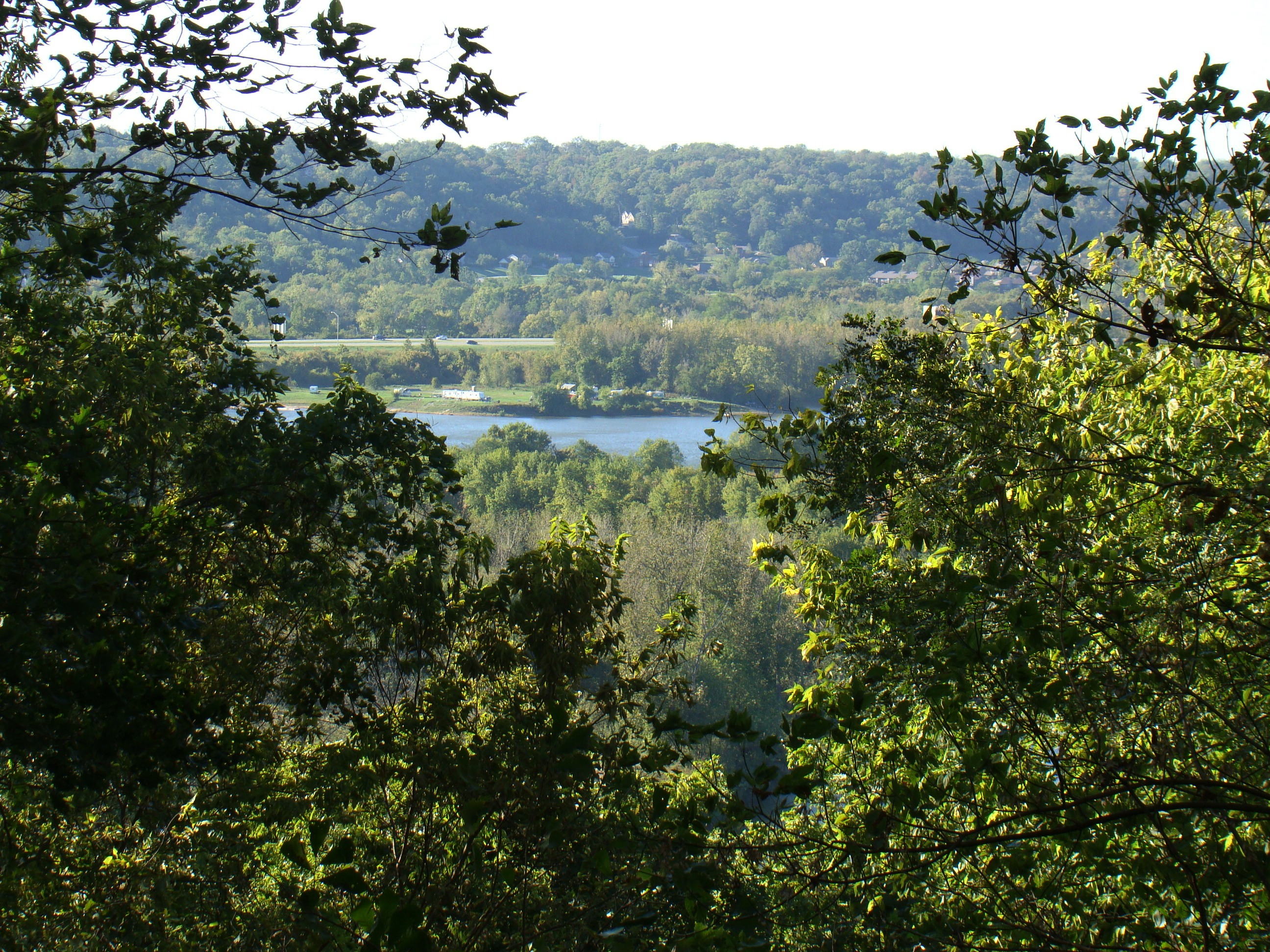
Shawnee Lookout

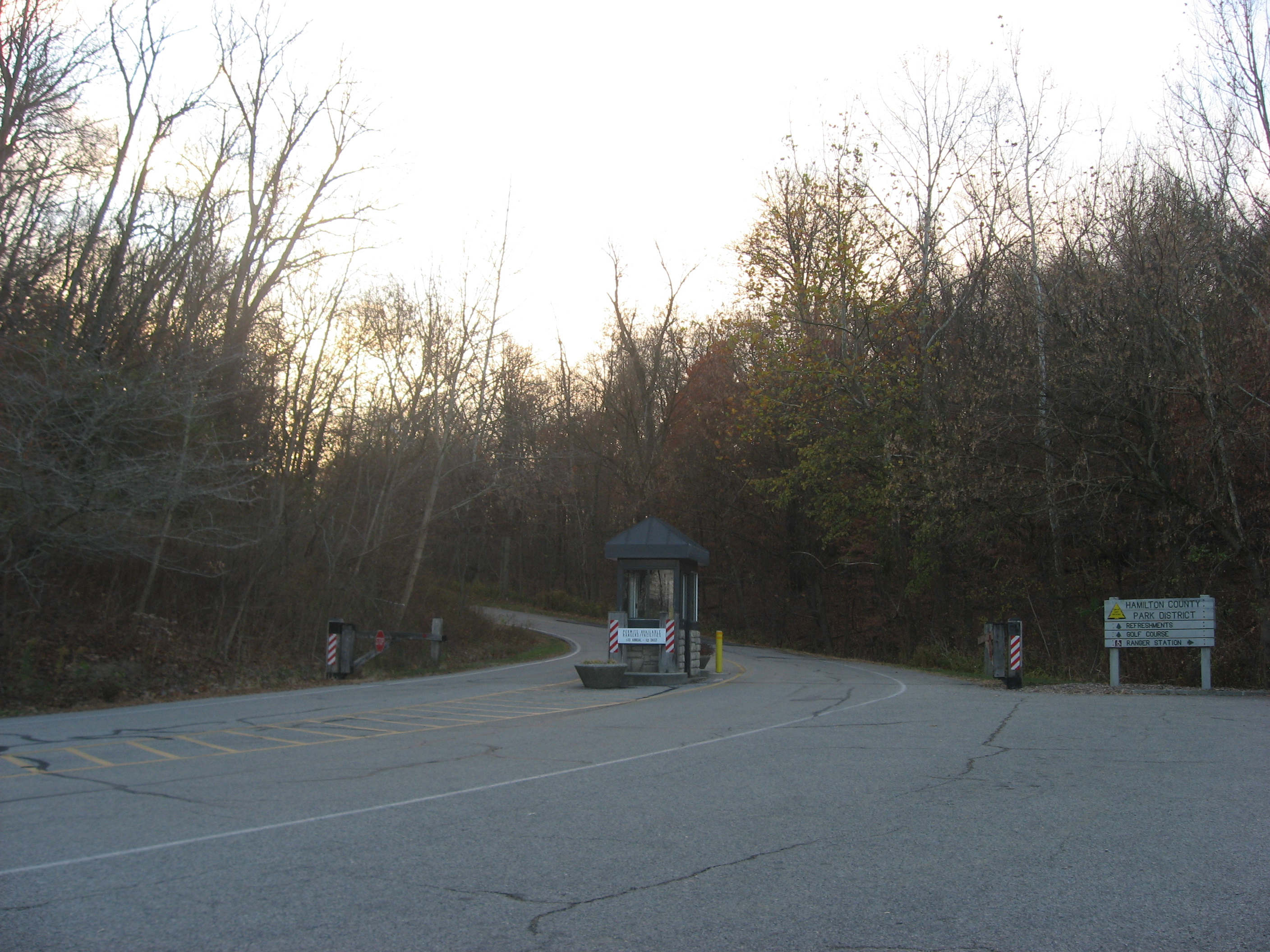
Shawnee Lookout

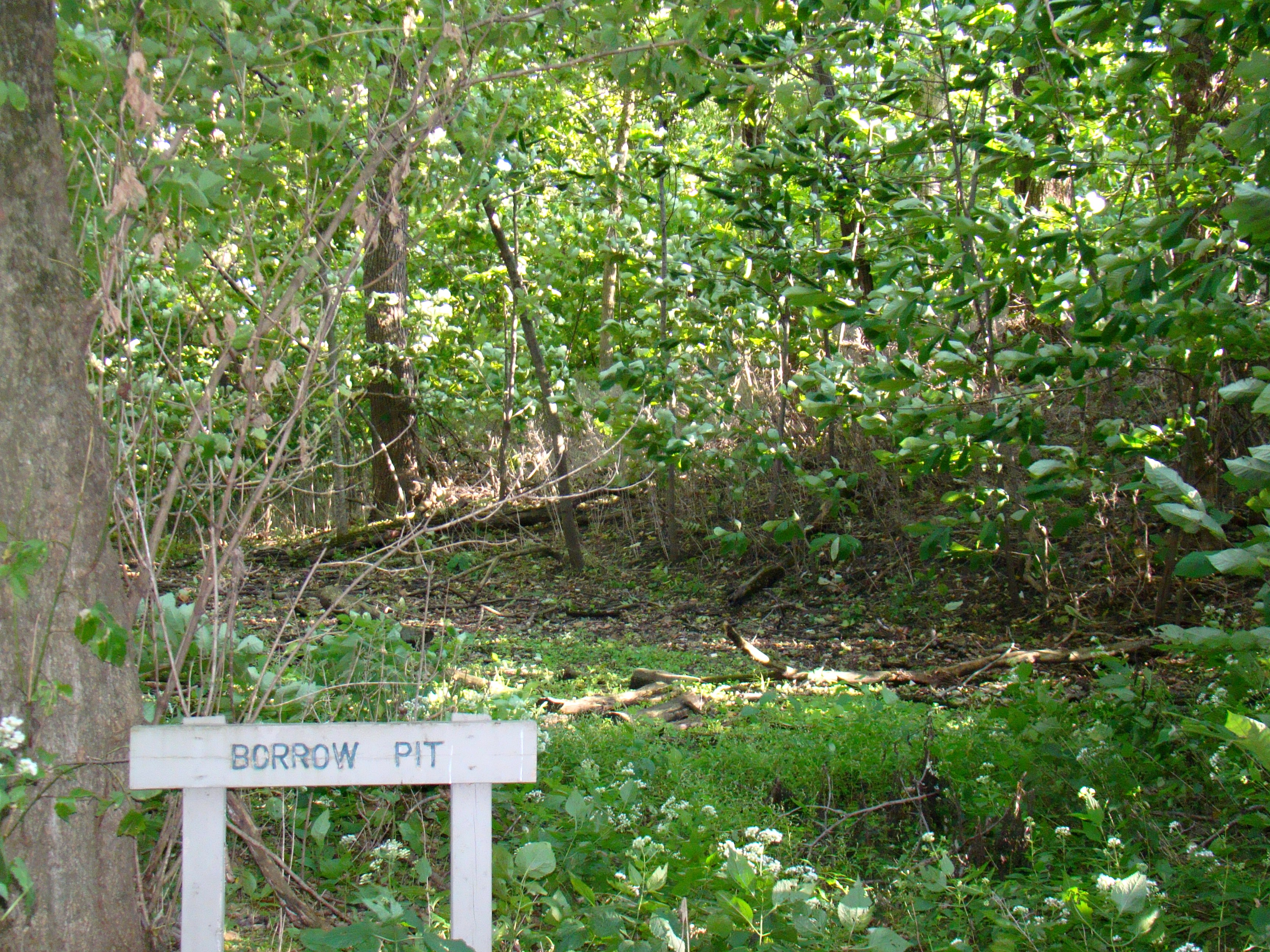
Shawnee Lookout fort

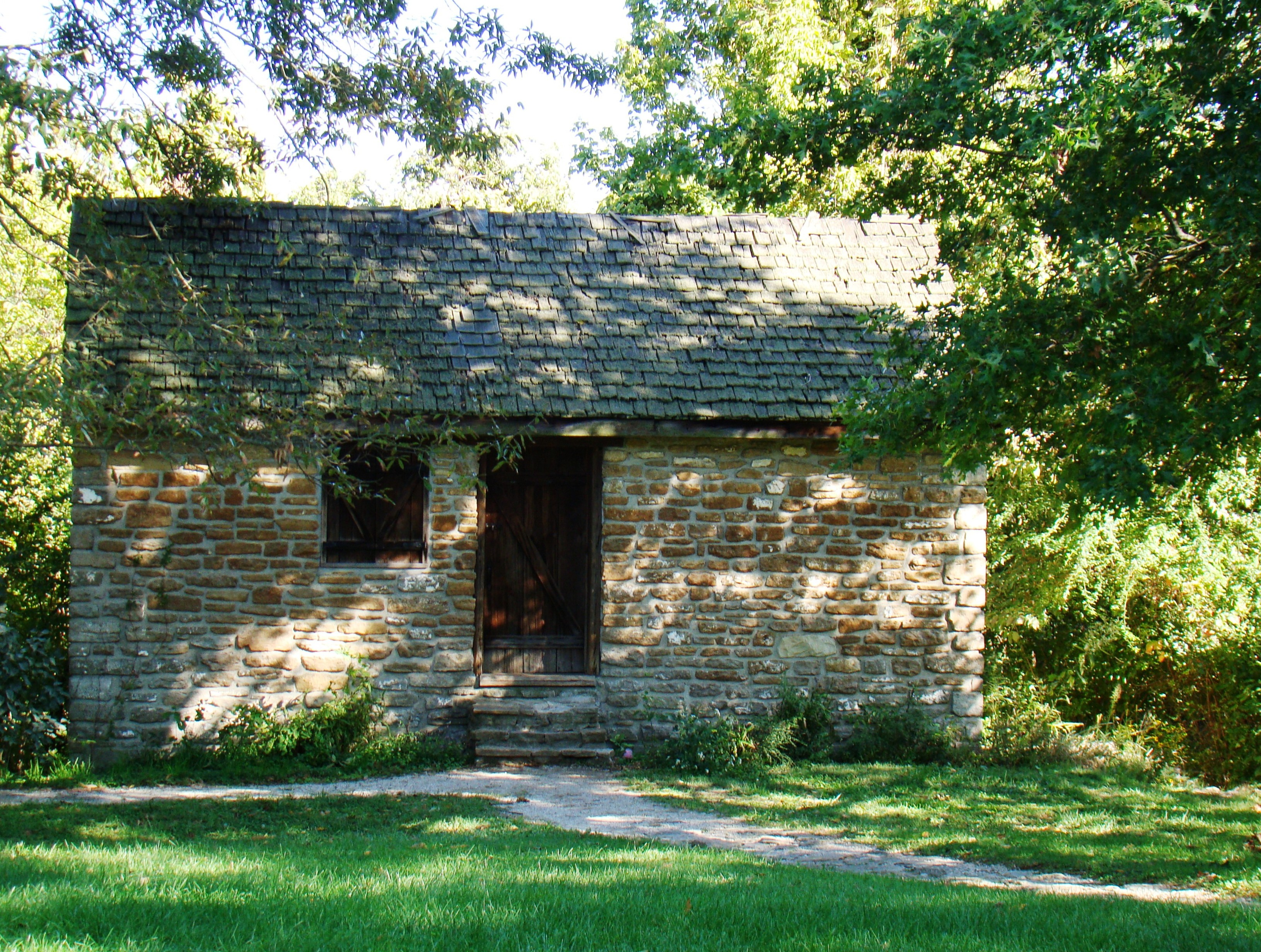
Milk house at Shawnee Lookout

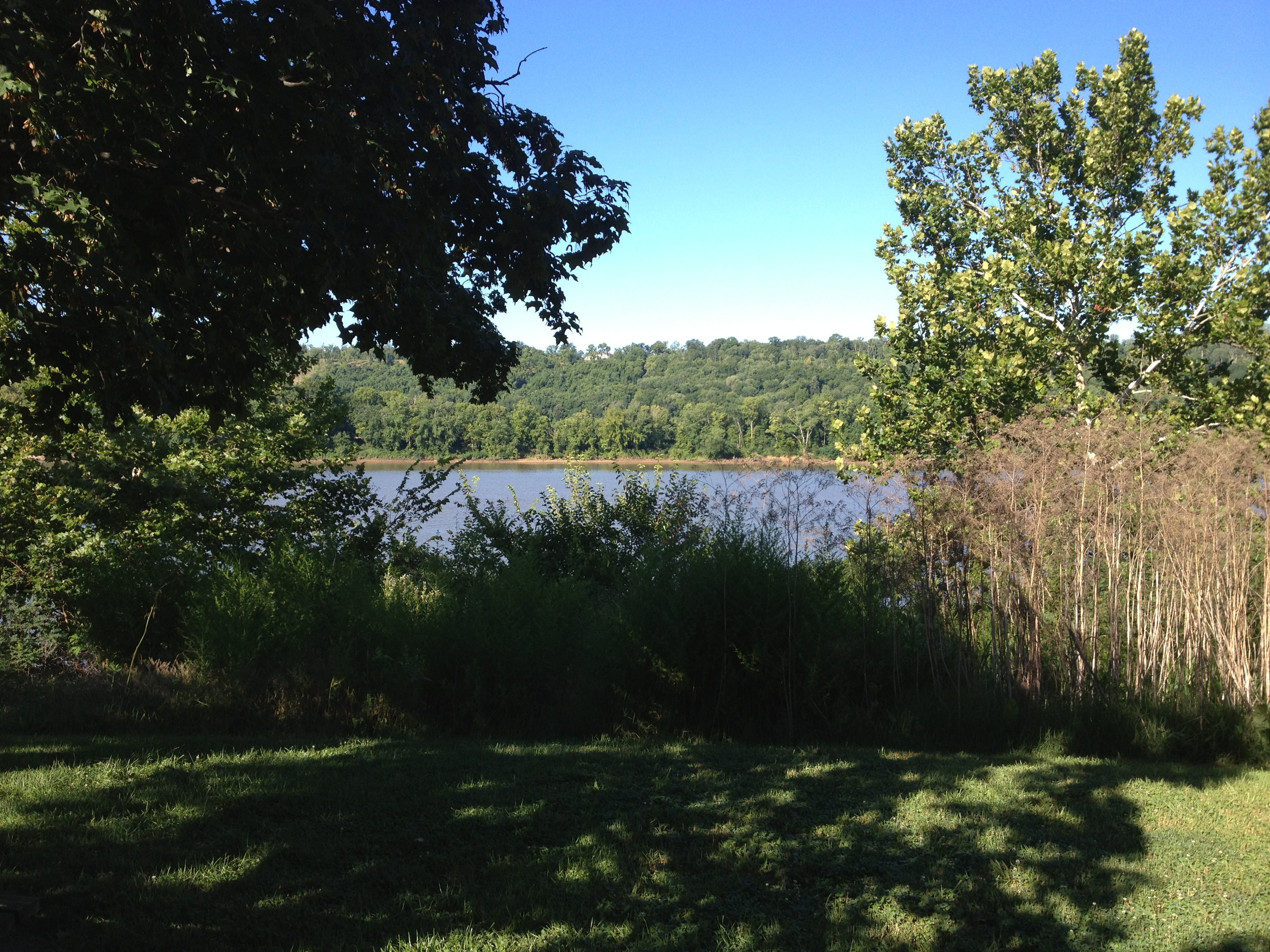
Fernbank Park

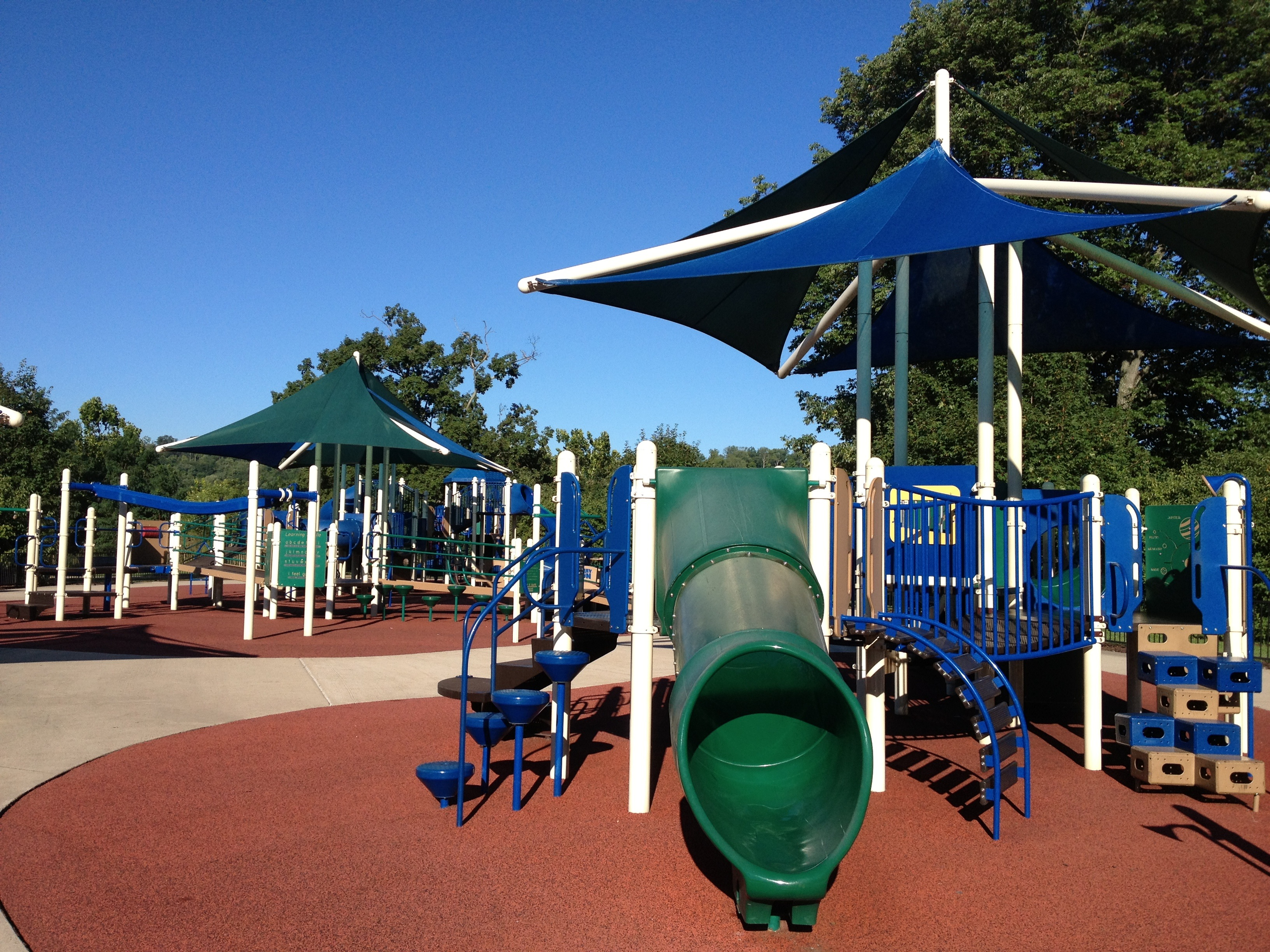
Playground at Fernbank Park

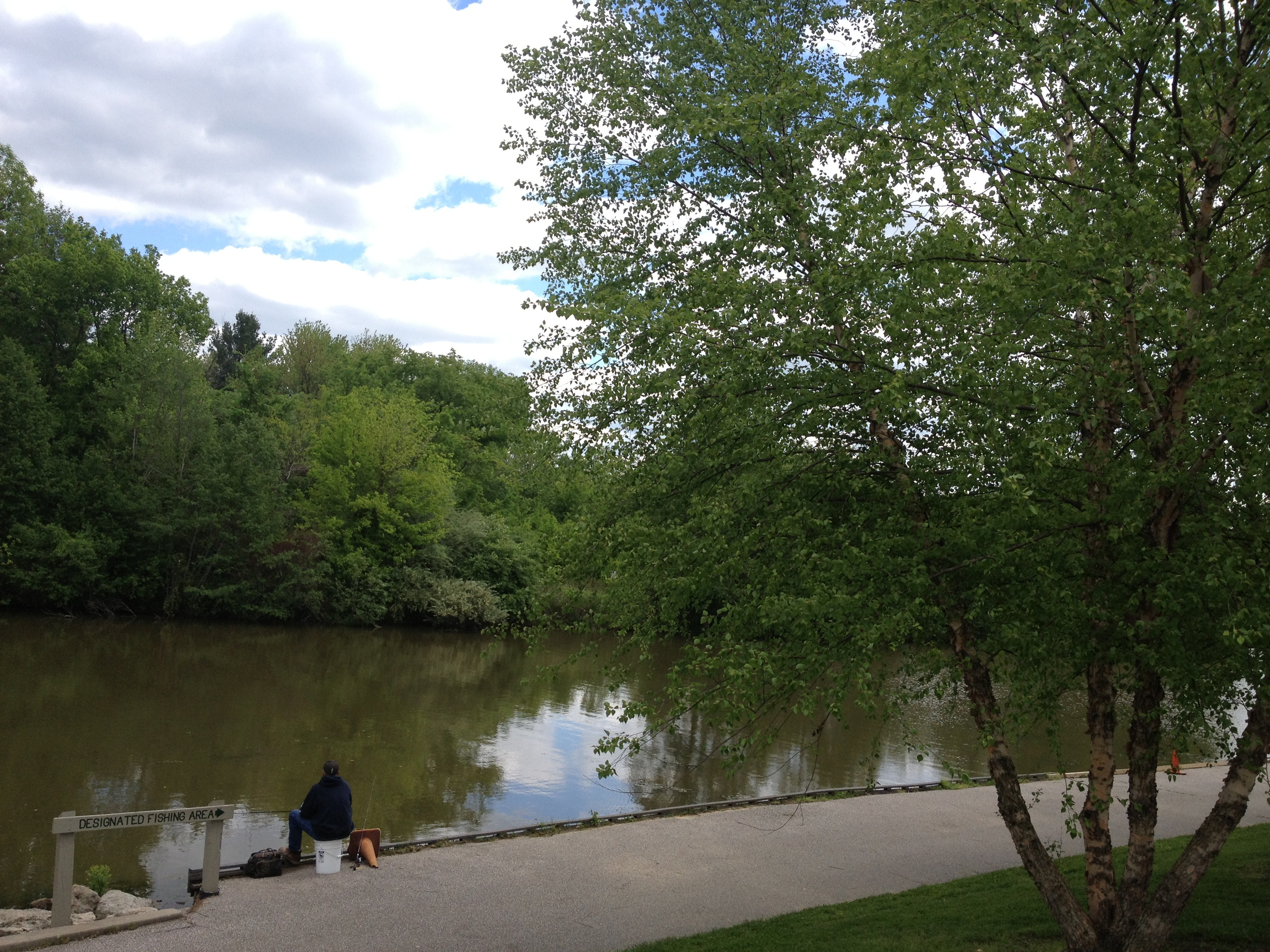
Miami Whitewater

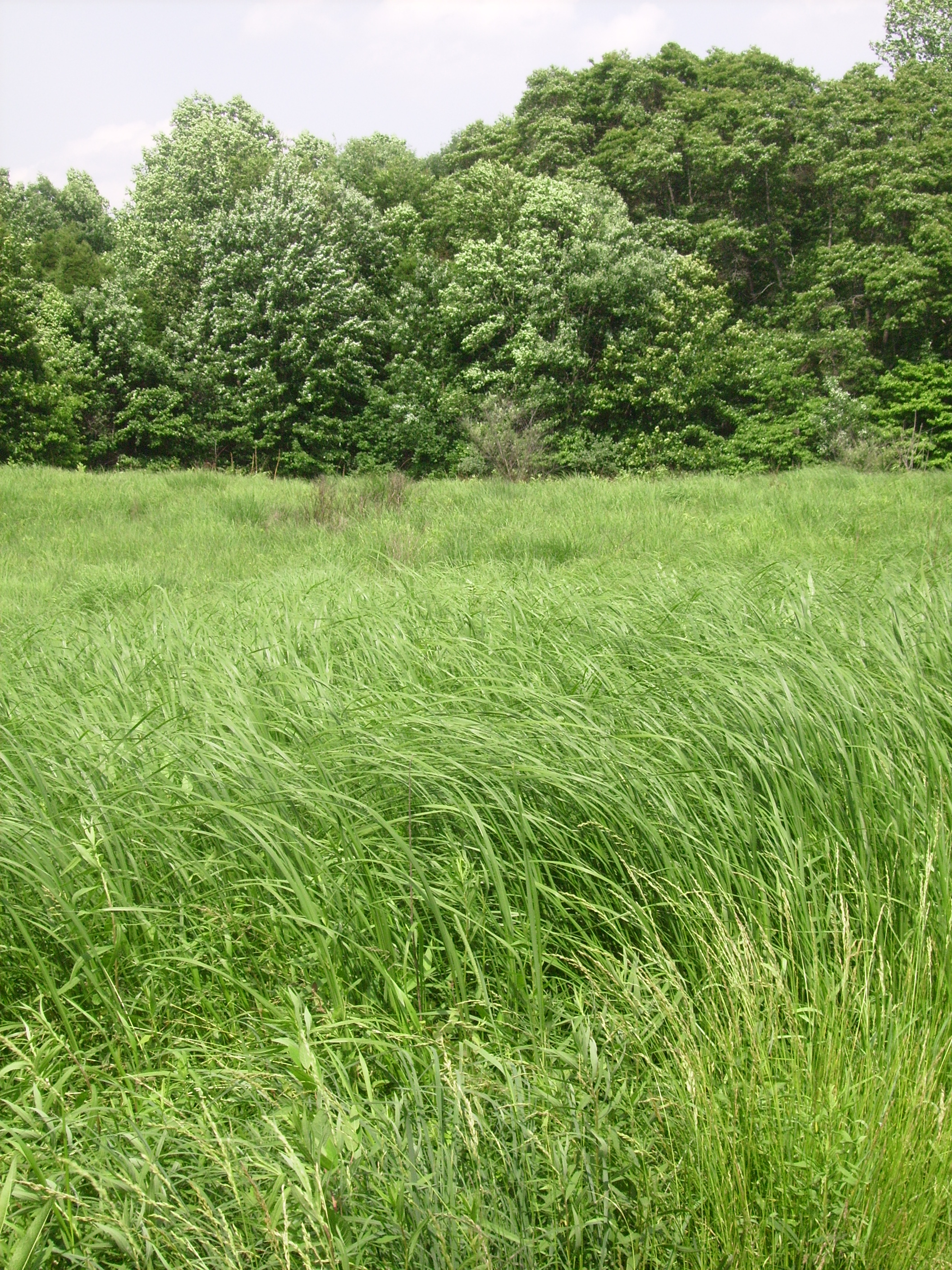
Miami Whitewater

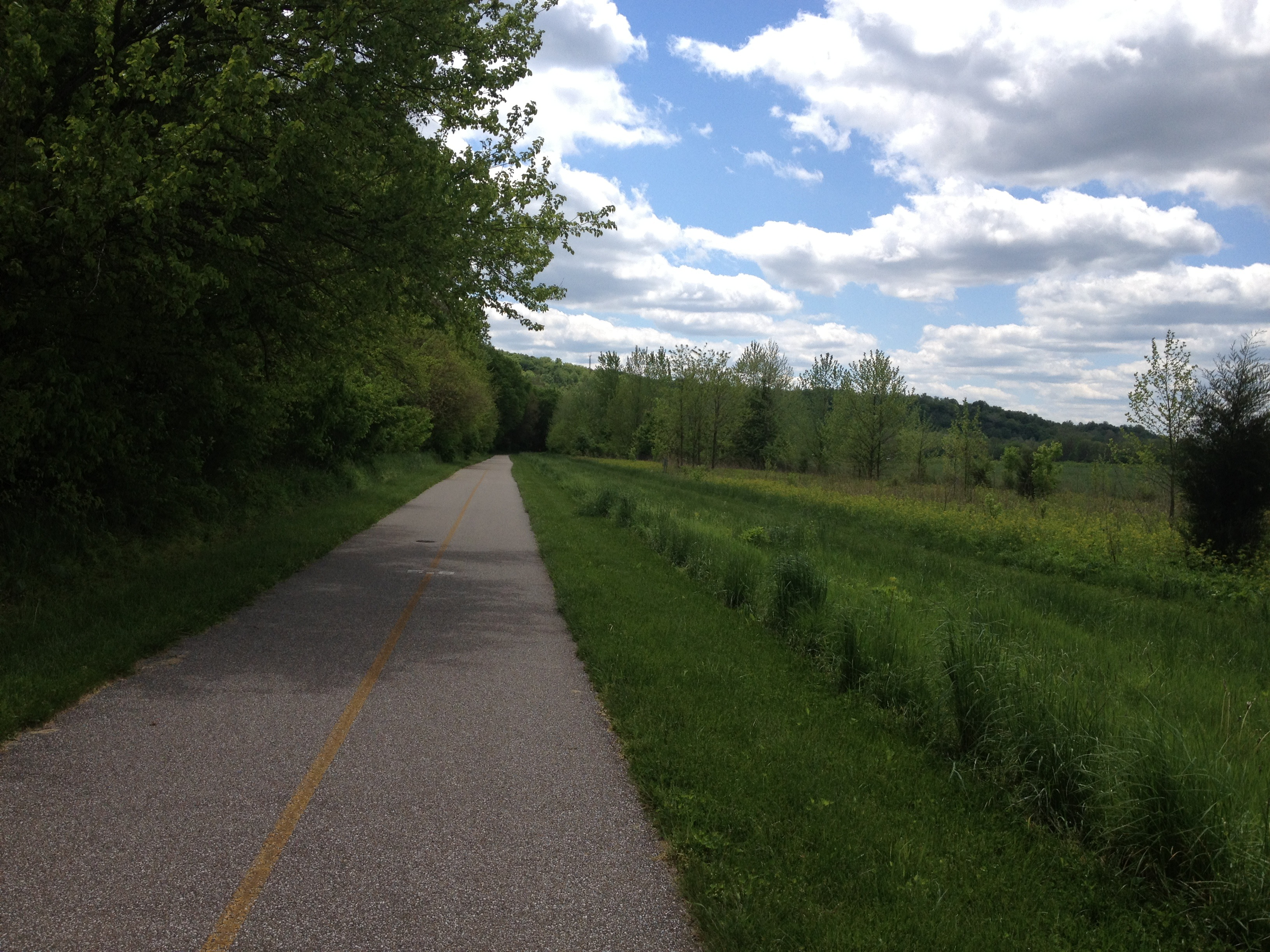
Shaker Trace trail, at Miami Whitewater Forest

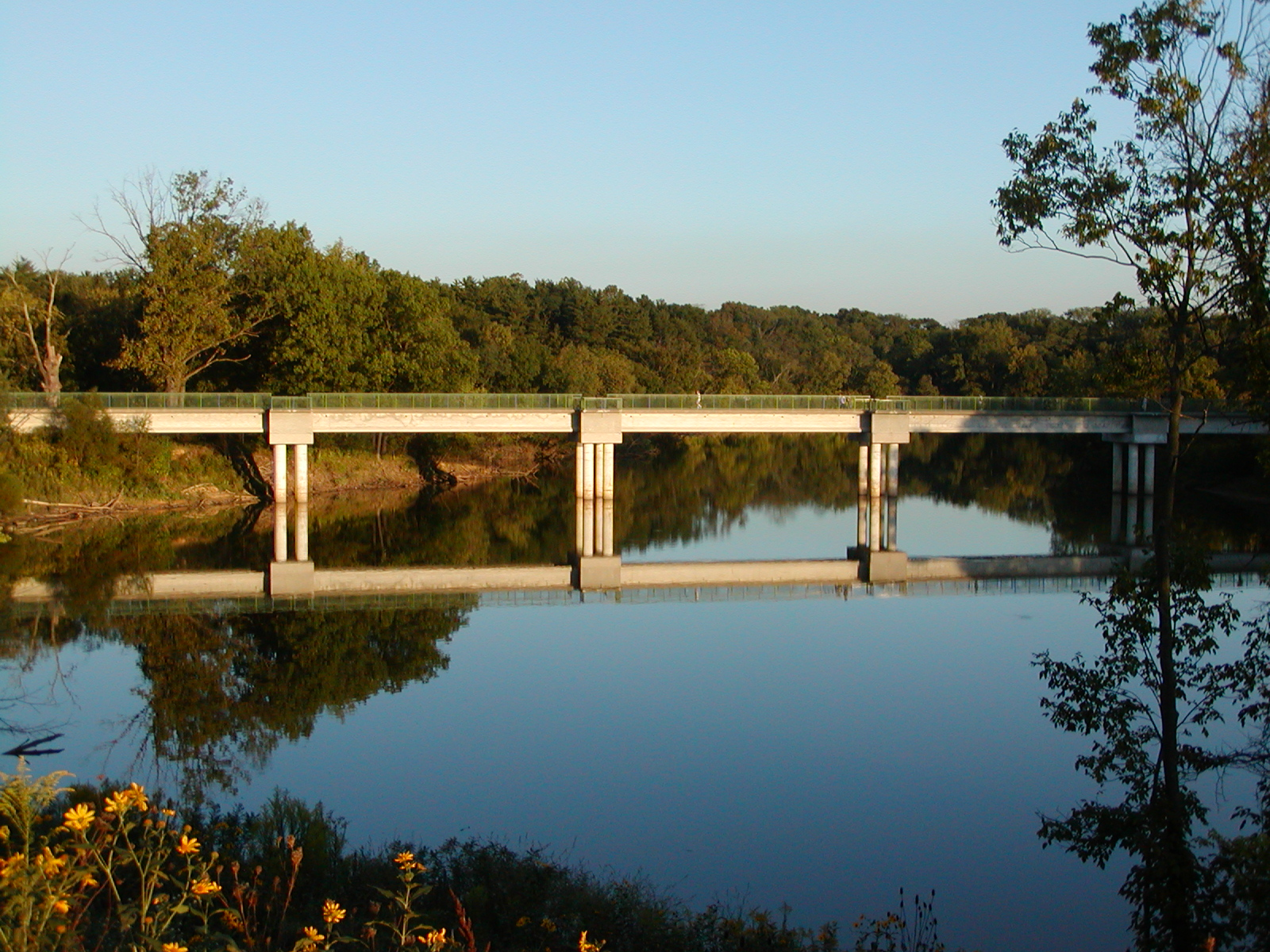
Pedestrian bridge at Winton Woods

== See also ==
- Anderson Township Park District
