= Anderson Park District =

Park district in Ohio, United States

Coordinates: 39°05′07″N 84°19′37″W

The Anderson Park District (officially the Anderson Township Park District) is the park district of Anderson Township, Hamilton County, Ohio, United States. Anderson Township is located roughly 12 miles (19 km) east of downtown Cincinnati. The chain of parks began operations in 1976 and now comprises over 500 acres (2.0 km^{2}) of parkland, and parks are open from dawn to dusk to the public. The district's main park is Juilfs Park.

== Parks ==
- Beech Acres Park
- Clear Creek Park
- Johnson Hills Park
- Juilfs Park
- Kellogg Park
- Laverty Park
- Riverside Park
- Veterans Park

== See also ==
- Great Parks of Hamilton County
