= Mack North, Ohio =

- Former CDP
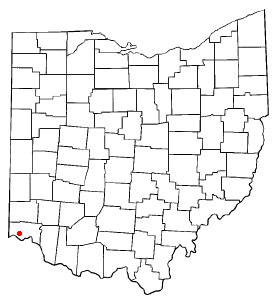
- Location of Mack North, Ohio
- Coordinates: 39°9′57″N 84°39′35″W
- Country: United States
- State: Ohio
- County: Hamilton

Area
  - Total: 3.1 sq mi (8.0 km^{2})
  - Land: 3.1 sq mi (8.0 km^{2})
  - Water: 0 sq mi (0.0 km^{2})

Population (2000)
  - Total: 3,529
  - Density: 1,147/sq mi (442.9/km^{2})
- Time zone: UTC-5 (Eastern (EST))
  - Summer (DST): UTC-4 (EDT)
- FIPS code: 39-46151

Mack North was a census-designated place (CDP) in Hamilton County, Ohio, United States. The population was 3,529 at the 2000 census. For the 2010 census, it became part of the Mack CDP.

== Geography ==
Mack North was located at 39°9′57″N 84°39′35″W (39.165758, -84.659599).

According to the United States Census Bureau, the CDP had a total area of 3.1 square miles (8.0 km^{2}), all of it land.

== Demographics ==
As of the census of 2000, there were 3,529 people, 1,141 households, and 974 families residing in the CDP. The population density was 1,147.2 inhabitants per square mile (442.9/km^{2}). There were 1,167 housing units at an average density of 379.4 per square mile (146.5/km^{2}). The racial makeup of the CDP was 98.10% White, 0.79% African American, 0.31% Native American, 0.11% Asian, 0.09% from other races, and 0.60% from two or more races. Hispanic or Latino of any race were 0.71% of the population.

There were 1,141 households, out of which 43.5% had children under the age of 18 living with them, 75.7% were married couples living together, 6.7% had a female householder with no husband present, and 14.6% were non-families. 13.0% of all households were made up of individuals, and 6.7% had someone living alone who was 65 years of age or older. The average household size was 3.09 and the average family size was 3.40.

In the CDP, the population was spread out, with 30.6% under the age of 18, 8.0% from 18 to 24, 26.2% from 25 to 44, 25.7% from 45 to 64, and 9.6% who were 65 years of age or older. The median age was 37 years. For every 100 females, there were 102.2 males. For every 100 females age 18 and over, there were 99.3 males.

The median income for a household in the CDP was $71,797, and the median income for a family was $77,560. Males had a median income of $50,046 versus $30,195 for females. The per capita income for the CDP was $28,214. About 2.6% of families and 4.0% of the population were below the poverty line, including 8.4% of those under age 18 and 3.4% of those age 65 or over.
