= Addyston, Ohio =

- Village
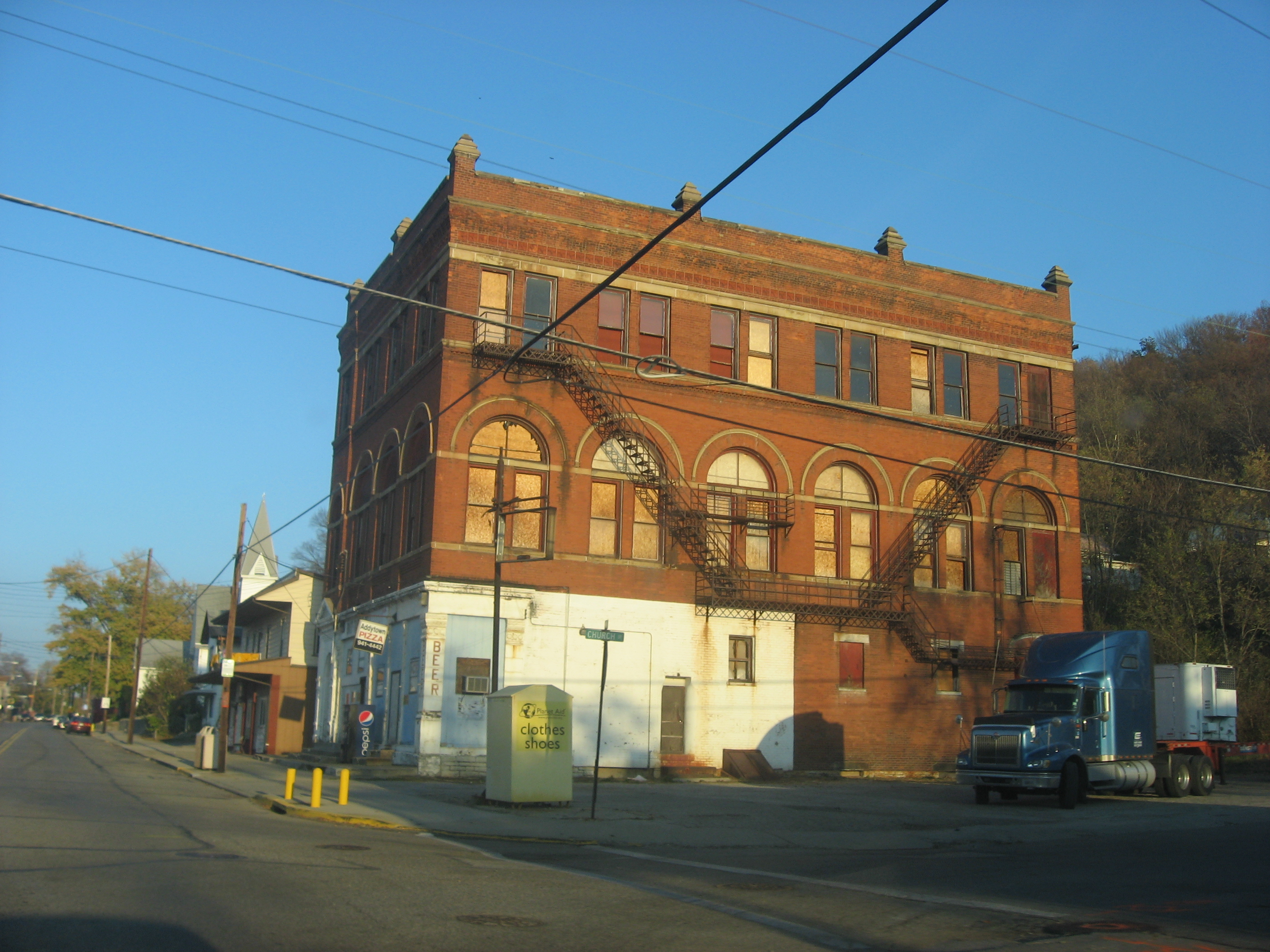
- Main Street in the historic district

- Location in Hamilton County and the state of Ohio.
- Coordinates: 39°07′50″N 84°42′12″W
- Country: United States
- State: Ohio
- County: Hamilton
- Township: Miami

Government
  - Mayor: Lisa Mear

Area
  - Total: 0.90 sq mi (2.34 km^{2})
  - Land: 0.85 sq mi (2.20 km^{2})
  - Water: 0.058 sq mi (0.15 km^{2})
- Elevation: 492 ft (150 m)

Population (2020)
  - Total: 927
  - Estimate (2023): 904
  - Density: 1,093.0/sq mi (422.02/km^{2})
- Time zone: UTC-5 (Eastern (EST))
  - Summer (DST): UTC-4 (EDT)
- ZIP code: 45001
- Area code: 513
- FIPS code: 39-00436
- GNIS feature ID: 2397913
- Website: www.addystonohio.org

Addyston is a village in Miami Township, Hamilton County, Ohio, United States. Located along the Ohio River, it is a western suburb of the neighboring city of Cincinnati. The population was 927 at the 2020 census.

== History ==
The area that would later become Addyston was known as "Coal City" by the 1870s, as it was home to two highly productive coal elevators along the Ohio River. Canadian immigrant Matthew Addy purchased an area of Coal City's riverfront in 1889 and subsequently founded the Addyston Pipe and Steel Company. Addyston was incorporated in 1891. Addyston served as a company town for Addy's foundry, with nearly 80% of the village's homes rented by Pipe and Steel Company workers by the early 1900s. In 1894, the company entered into a cartel with other pipe manufacturers in which they agreed not to compete with each other in order to increase the price of their products. The cartel was the subject of an 1899 US Supreme Court antitrust case, Addyston Pipe & Steel Co. v. United States.

Addyston was devastated by the Ohio River flood of 1937. The Pipe and Steel Company, by then renamed U.S. Pipe and Steel, ceased operations in 1950. Its closure resulted in population loss and the blighting of many of the village's buildings, particularly in the Sekitan neighborhood. Monsanto began operating at the site of Addy's foundry in 1952, followed by Bayer in 1995, Lanxess in 2005, and Ineos in 2007. In 1991, part of Addyston was added to the National Register of Historic Places as the Village of Addyston Historic District. The village's fire department closed in 1999.

Addyston's industrial plant has contributed to high levels of pollution in the surrounding area. In addition to dumping many of its chemicals into the Ohio River, the plant has made use of several landfills in the region. The Ohio Environmental Protection Agency (EPA) attempted to designate the plant's Bond Road Landfill in Whitewater Township as a superfund site due to its extensive pollution in the 1990s, but this was rejected by the federal EPA. The plant has produced or used numerous carcinogens over its history, including acrylonitrile, butadiene, and polychlorinated biphenyls (PCBs). Addyston's Meredith Hitchens Elementary School ceased operations following a 2005 report by the Ohio EPA that found a significantly heightened risk of cancer at the school due to pollution from the nearby plant. Its students were transferred to the Three Rivers School District, whose closest school was in Cleves. In 2009, Ineos and Lanxess agreed to spend $2 million to address the pollution in a deal with the EPA. The Addyston plant was cited in a 2021 lawsuit by the state of Ohio against Monsanto for PCB pollution. A Monsanto spokesperson confirmed that the Addyston plant made use of PCBs, but stated that they were not produced at the plant.

Many residents in the Cincinnati area regarded Addyston as a speed trap as early as 1948, which village officials repeatedly denied. An article in The Cincinnati Enquirer stated that its reputation as a speed trap was "mostly true", citing the fact that Addyston's mayor's court saw more than five times as many traffic cases per 100 residents than the average mayor's court in Ohio between 2017 and 2019. Addyston's police department issued 604 traffic tickets in 2019, which the Enquirer contrasted with the fact that U.S. Route 50 only passes through the village for two miles. In March 2020, Addyston Police Chief Dorian LaCourse resigned after it was revealed that he had sold over 60 submachine guns that he had acquired from gun salesmen in Indiana under the guise of using them for police demonstrations.

In 2021, Addyston's financial situation was referred to as a "record-keeping train wreck" by Ohio State Auditor Keith Faber. In October 2024, Ineos announced plans to close its plant in Addyston in the second quarter of 2025, stating that the plant was "no longer economical". Ineos violated the federal Worker Adjustment and Retraining Notification Act by failing to inform the US Department of Labor of its intention to close. The Ineos plant made up about a fourth of Addyston's annual revenue, paying $350,000 in income tax and $21,000 in property tax per year. The announcement of its closure deepened the village's financial crisis and raised media speculation about Addyston's potential dissolution and reabsorption into Miami Township. On November 12, 2024, the Addyston village council voted 4-3 to disband the village's police department and hand over law enforcement responsibility to the Hamilton County Sheriff's Office in order to reduce costs. In the wake of the disbandment, Addyston Police Chief Jacob Tenbrink suggested that dissolving into Miami Township may be necessary, though Miami Township Administrator Jim Brett expressed his desire for Addyston to remain independent.

By January 2025, informal talks had begun between Addyston and Cincinnati to discuss holding a referendum on the village's annexation into Cincinnati, with Addyston Mayor Lisa Mear describing herself as "on the fence" about annexation. Cincinnati Mayor Aftab Pureval stated that the city wished to explore the effects annexation would have on Cincinnati's finances and public services. The negotiations were arranged by Bill Seitz, who had formerly served as a Republican member of the Ohio House of Representatives. A majority of the village council expressed their opposition to annexation at a February council meeting, but stated that no firm decision had been made regarding the village's future and that extensive funding cuts were needed to maintain the village's independence.

== Geography ==
According to the United States Census Bureau, the village has a total area of 0.91 square miles (2.36 km^{2}), of which 0.85 square miles (2.20 km^{2}) is land and 0.06 square miles (0.16 km^{2}) is water.

== Demographics ==
Historical population
Census	Pop.	Note	%±
1890	1,182		—
1900	1,513		28.0%
1910	1,543		2.0%
1920	1,448		−6.2%
1930	1,708		18.0%
1940	1,610		−5.7%
1950	1,651		2.5%
1960	1,376		−16.7%
1970	1,336		−2.9%
1980	1,195		−10.6%
1990	1,198		0.3%
2000	1,010		−15.7%
2010	938		−7.1%
2020	927		−1.2%
2023 (est.)	904	▼	−2.5%
U.S. Decennial Census

=== 2020 census ===
As of the census of 2020, there were 927 people living in the village, for a population density of 1,093.16 people per square mile (422.02/km^{2}). There were 440 housing units. The racial makeup of the village was 82.4% White, 6.7% Black or African American, 0.9% Native American, 0.2% Asian, 0.0% Pacific Islander, 1.2% from some other race, and 8.6% from two or more races. 2.3% of the population were Hispanic or Latino of any race.

There were 255 households, out of which 52.9% had children under the age of 18 living with them, 46.7% were married couples living together, 14.5% had a male householder with no spouse present, and 22.7% had a female householder with no spouse present. 20.8% of all households were made up of individuals, and 3.9% were someone living alone who was 65 years of age or older. The average household size was 3.10, and the average family size was 3.48.

36.2% of the village's population were under the age of 18, 53.2% were 18 to 64, and 10.6% were 65 years of age or older. The median age was 28.2. For every 100 females, there were 99.0 males.

According to the U.S. Census American Community Survey, for the period 2016-2020 the estimated median annual income for a household in the village was $63,313, and the median income for a family was $61,042. About 27.0% of the population were living below the poverty line, including 44.4% of those under age 18 and 0.0% of those age 65 or over. About 64.6% of the population were employed, and 8.6% had a bachelor's degree or higher.

=== 2010 census ===
As of the census of 2010, there were 938 people, 372 households, and 228 families living in the village. The population density was 1,103.5 inhabitants per square mile (426.1/km^{2}). There were 448 housing units at an average density of 527.1 per square mile (203.5/km^{2}). The racial makeup of the village was 89.7% White, 5.7% African American, 0.2% Native American, 0.2% Asian, 0.1% from other races, and 4.2% from two or more races. Hispanic or Latino of any race were 1.9% of the population.

There were 372 households, of which 33.6% had children under the age of 18 living with them, 33.6% were married couples living together, 20.7% had a female householder with no husband present, 7.0% had a male householder with no wife present, and 38.7% were non-families. 29.6% of all households were made up of individuals, and 10% had someone living alone who was 65 years of age or older. The average household size was 2.52 and the average family size was 3.15.

The median age in the village was 34.2 years. 25.3% of residents were under the age of 18; 11.5% were between the ages of 18 and 24; 27% were from 25 to 44; 26.1% were from 45 to 64; and 10.2% were 65 years of age or older. The gender makeup of the village was 50.5% male and 49.5% female.

=== 2000 census ===
As of the census of 2000, there were 1,010 people, 365 households, and 269 families living in the village. The population density was 1,165.1 inhabitants per square mile (449.8/km^{2}). There were 408 housing units at an average density of 470.7 per square mile (181.7/km^{2}). The racial makeup of the village was 87.82% White, 8.42% African American, 0.50% Native American, 0.40% Asian, 1.09% from other races, and 1.78% from two or more races. Hispanic or Latino of any race were 1.78% of the population.

There were 365 households, out of which 40.5% had children under the age of 18 living with them, 44.1% were married couples living together, 24.1% had a female householder with no husband present, and 26.3% were non-families. 24.1% of all households were made up of individuals, and 7.1% had someone living alone who was 65 years of age or older. The average household size was 2.77 and the average family size was 3.22.

In the village, the population was spread out, with 31.7% under the age of 18, 8.8% from 18 to 24, 31.4% from 25 to 44, 18.0% from 45 to 64, and 10.1% who were 65 years of age or older. The median age was 31 years. For every 100 females, there were 98.0 males. For every 100 females age 18 and over, there were 92.2 males.

The median income for a household in the village was $33,000, and the median income for a family was $34,808. Males had a median income of $29,583 versus $25,536 for females. The per capita income for the village was $13,266. About 9.2% of families and 11.6% of the population were below the poverty line, including 14.4% of those under age 18 and 14.8% of those age 65 or over.

== See also ==
- List of cities and towns along the Ohio River
