= Miami Township, Hamilton County, Ohio =

Township in Ohio, US

- Township
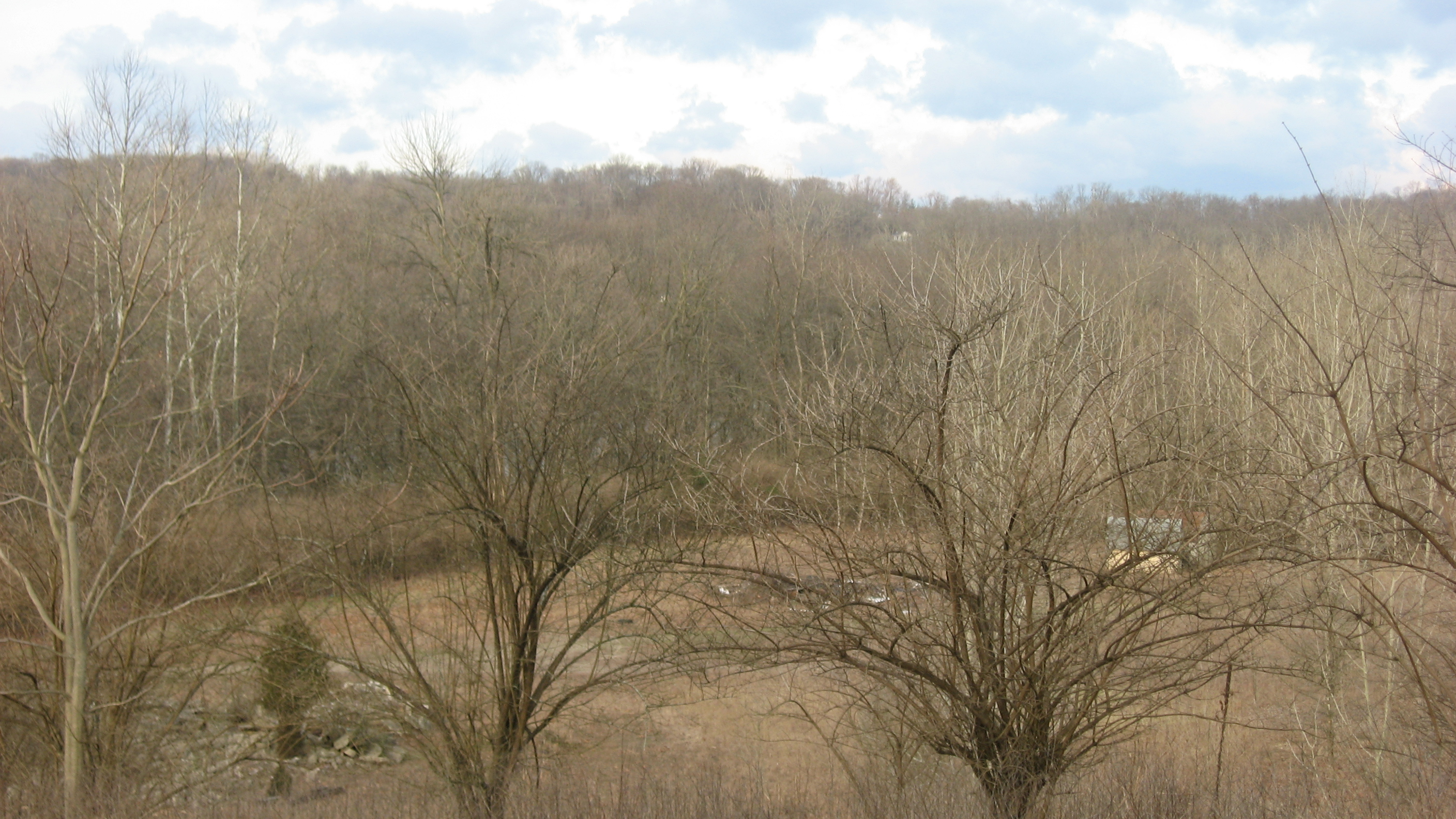
- Wooded hills along the Great Miami River

- Location in Hamilton County and the state of Ohio.
- Coordinates: 39°9′33″N 84°44′25″W
- Country: United States
- State: Ohio
- County: Hamilton

Area
  - Total: 23.8 sq mi (61.6 km^{2})
  - Land: 22.7 sq mi (58.8 km^{2})
  - Water: 1.1 sq mi (2.8 km^{2})
- Elevation: 778 ft (237 m)

Population (2020)
  - Total: 15,969
  - Density: 703.4/sq mi (271.58/km^{2})
- Time zone: UTC-5 (Eastern (EST))
  - Summer (DST): UTC-4 (EDT)
- FIPS code: 39-49364
- GNIS feature ID: 1086220
- Website: www.miamitownship.org

Miami Township is one of the twelve townships of Hamilton County, Ohio, United States. The population was 15,969 as of the 2020 census.

== Name and history ==
Statewide, other Miami Townships are located in Clermont, Greene, Logan, and Montgomery counties.

The township was named for its location at the point where the Great Miami River flows into the Ohio River, at the state's low point.

The monument and tomb of U.S. President William Henry Harrison is located just off U.S. Route 50 in the township, and his former residence is located in nearby North Bend.

== Geography ==
Located in the southwestern corner of the county along the Ohio River, it borders the following townships:

- Whitewater Township - north
- Colerain Township - northeast
- Green Township - east
- Delhi Township - southeast
- Boone County, Kentucky - south, across the Ohio River.
- Lawrenceburg Township, Dearborn County, Indiana - southwest

Four municipalities are located in Miami Township:

- A small part of the city of Cincinnati, the county seat of Hamilton County, in the southeast, along the Ohio River above Addyston
- The village of Addyston, in the southeast, along the Ohio River between Cincinnati and North Bend
- The village of North Bend, in the south, along the Ohio River below Addyston
- The village of Cleves, in the center

The census-designated places of Grandview, Miami Heights, Shawnee, and a portion of Mack are located in Miami Township.

== Demographics ==
Historical population
Census	Pop.	Note	%±
1820	1,426		—
1850	1,305		—
1860	1,688		29.3%
1870	2,105		24.7%
1880	2,317		10.1%
1890	3,990		72.2%
1900	4,511		13.1%
1910	4,498		−0.3%
1920	4,297		−4.5%
1930	5,294		23.2%
1940	5,757		8.7%
1950	6,679		16.0%
1960	8,332		24.7%
1970	9,041		8.5%
1980	9,941		10.0%
1990	11,552		16.2%
2000	13,496		16.8%
2010	15,757		16.8%
2020	15,969		1.3%

=== 2020 census ===
As of the census of 2020, there were 15,969 people living in the township, for a population density of 703.5 people per square mile (271.6/km^{2}). There were 6,167 housing units. The racial makeup of the township was 93.7% White, 1.0% Black or African American, 0.2% Native American, 0.5% Asian, 0.0% Pacific Islander, 0.4% from some other race, and 4.2% from two or more races. 1.0% of the population were Hispanic or Latino of any race.

There were 5,725 households, out of which 32.6% had children under the age of 18 living with them, 63.2% were married couples living together, 12.5% had a male householder with no spouse present, and 19.2% had a female householder with no spouse present. 20.0% of all households were made up of individuals, and 10.8% were someone living alone who was 65 years of age or older. The average household size was 2.76, and the average family size was 3.18.

24.5% of the township's population were under the age of 18, 58.1% were 18 to 64, and 17.4% were 65 years of age or older. The median age was 42.5. For every 100 females, there were 95.8 males.

According to the U.S. Census American Community Survey, for the period 2016-2020 the estimated median annual income for a household in the township was $101,133, and the median income for a family was $111,578. About 7.0% of the population were living below the poverty line, including 10.5% of those under age 18 and 3.2% of those age 65 or over. About 62.5% of the population were employed, and 31.3% had a bachelor's degree or higher.

== Government ==
The township is governed by a three-member board of trustees, who are elected in November of odd-numbered years to a four-year term beginning on the following January 1. Two are elected in the year after the presidential election and one is elected in the year before it. There is also an elected township fiscal officer, who serves a four-year term beginning on April 1 of the year after the election, which is held in November of the year before the presidential election. Vacancies in the fiscal officership or on the board of trustees are filled by the remaining trustees.

== Education ==
The Township is primarily served by the Three Rivers Local School District, which includes Taylor High School.
