= Taylor High School (Cleves, Ohio) =

Location
- 56 Cooper Road; Cleves, Hamilton County, Ohio 45002; United States; 39°9′14″N 84°44′48″W

Information
- Type: Public, Coeducational high school
- Established: 1926; 100 years ago
- School board: Christina Hughes, Garyne Evans, Susan Miller, Ryan McDonald, Tracy Snider
- School district: Three Rivers Local Schools
- Superintendent: Mark Ault
- Chairperson: Ryan McDonald
- Principal: Mark Smiley
- Teaching staff: 35.14 (FTE)
- Grades: 7-12
- Enrollment: 614 (2023-2024)
- Average class size: 23
- Student to teacher ratio: 17.47
- Colors: Yellow and Black
- Athletics conference: Cincinnati Hills League
- Mascot: Yellow Jacket
- Team name: Yellow Jackets
- Rival: Lawrenceburg High School (Indiana), Harrison High School
- Accreditation: North Central Association of Colleges and Schools
- Website: www.threeriversschools.org/taylor-high-school/

Taylor High School is a public high school in Cleves, Ohio. It is the only high school in the Three Rivers Local School District. It has been given the designation as an "Excellent with Distinction School" from the state of Ohio since such designations have been in effect. The School District and the High School serve all of Miami Township, which includes the villages of Cleves and North Bend. The Yellow Jackets are a long time member of the Cincinnati Hills League. The schools primary league rivals are the Wyoming Cowboys and the Finneytown Wildcats.

== Ohio High School Athletic Association State Championships ==
- Boys Baseball – 1949, 1962
- Girls Cross Country – 2002, 2004

== Notable alumni ==
- Phil Clark, former NFL player
- Dana Stubblefield, former NFL player
- Pamela Myers, actress

== New School ==
The Three Rivers School District received a grant from the state of Ohio to fund the building of a new school. The district chose to build a Pre-K to 12 school, as many of the buildings in the district are aging. On March 8 the Three Rivers Board of Education approved the contracts for the new building. The groundbreaking took place on September 18, 2011 and construction has kept on pace since this time. The school began classes on schedule on September 9, 2013.
