= Cleves, Ohio =

- Village
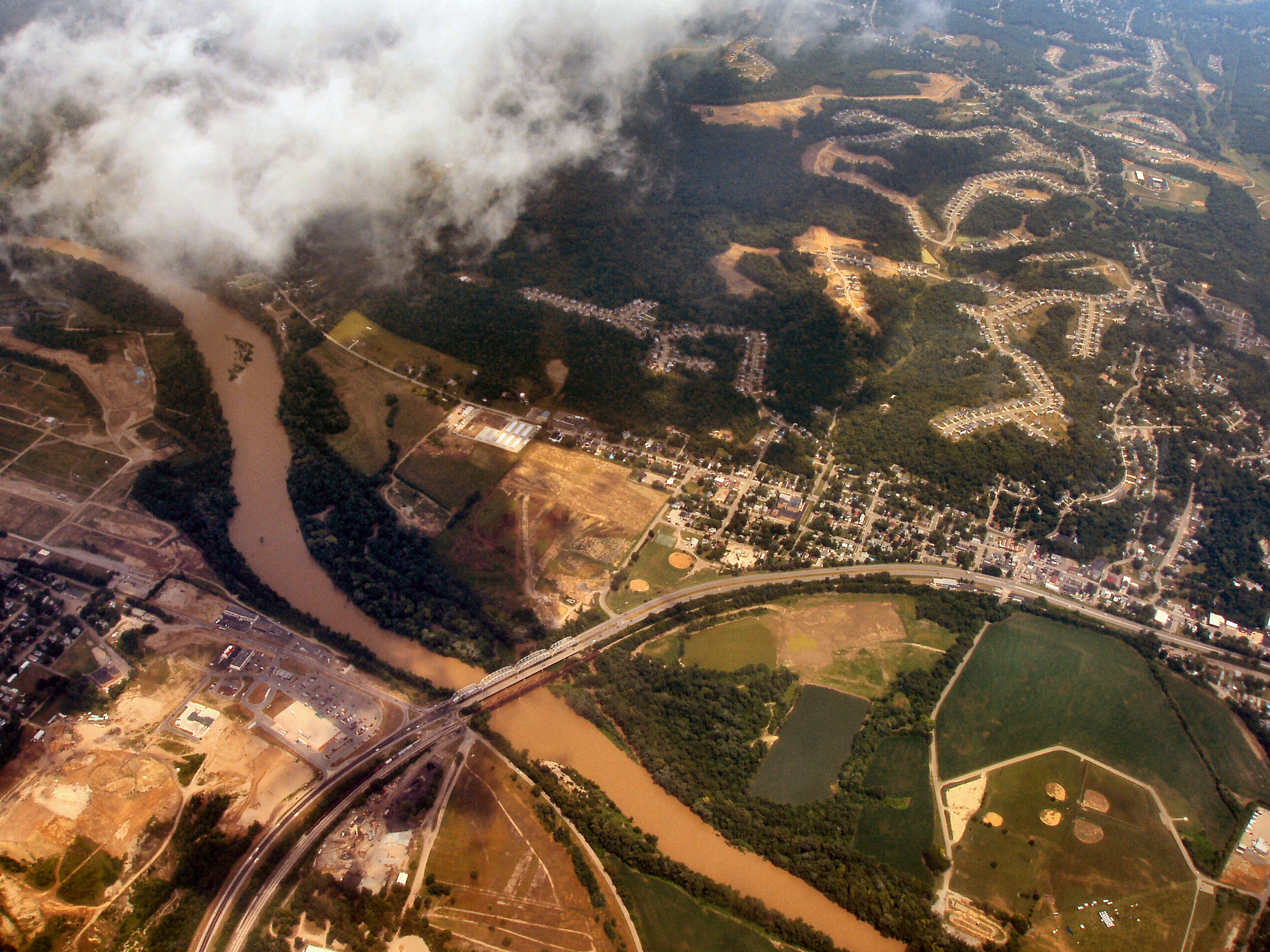
- Cleves from the air, looking northeast, along the Great Miami River
- Motto: "Heart of the Three Rivers Valley"
- Location in Hamilton County and the state of Ohio.
- Coordinates: 39°09′47″N 84°45′06″W
- Country: United States
- State: Ohio
- County: Hamilton
- Township: Miami

Government
  - Mayor: Chuck Birkholtz (R)

Area
  - Total: 1.61 sq mi (4.17 km^{2})
  - Land: 1.54 sq mi (4.00 km^{2})
  - Water: 0.066 sq mi (0.17 km^{2})
- Elevation: 630 ft (190 m)

Population (2020)
  - Total: 3,414
  - Estimate (2023): 3,355
  - Density: 2,208.6/sq mi (852.73/km^{2})
  - Demonym: Clevite
- Time zone: UTC-5 (Eastern (EST))
  - Summer (DST): UTC-4 (EDT)
- ZIP code: 45002
- Area code: 513
- FIPS code: 39-16028
- GNIS feature ID: 2397645
- Website: www.clevesoh.gov

Cleves is a village in Miami Township, Hamilton County, Ohio, United States. Located along the Ohio River, it is a western suburb of Cincinnati. The population was 3,414 at the 2020 census.

== Geography ==
Cleves is located between the Great Miami River and the Ohio River. It is separated from the Ohio River by the village of North Bend, along the southern border of Cleves. U.S. Route 50 passes through the village, leading east 16 miles (26 km) to downtown Cincinnati and west to Lawrenceburg, Indiana.

According to the United States Census Bureau, the village has a total area of 1.58 square miles (4.09 km^{2}), all land.

== History ==
The village was founded in 1818. It is named for John Cleves Symmes who lived here, laid out the original town site, and sold lots.

== Demographics ==
Historical population
Census	Pop.	Note	%±
1880	836		—
1890	1,227		46.8%
1900	1,328		8.2%
1910	1,423		7.2%
1920	1,454		2.2%
1930	1,711		17.7%
1940	1,871		9.4%
1950	1,981		5.9%
1960	2,076		4.8%
1970	2,044		−1.5%
1980	2,094		2.4%
1990	2,208		5.4%
2000	2,790		26.4%
2010	3,234		15.9%
2020	3,414		5.6%
2023 (est.)	3,355	▼	−1.7%
U.S. Decennial Census

=== 2020 census ===
As of the 2020 census, Cleves had a population of 3,414. The population density was 2,208.28 people per square mile (852.73/km^{2}). The median age was 35.4 years. 30.1% of residents were under the age of 18 and 10.5% of residents were 65 years of age or older. For every 100 females there were 100.7 males, and for every 100 females age 18 and over there were 101.5 males age 18 and over.

99.2% of residents lived in urban areas, while 0.8% lived in rural areas.

There were 1,142 households in Cleves, of which 42.6% had children under the age of 18 living in them. Of all households, 55.3% were married-couple households, 15.8% were households with a male householder and no spouse or partner present, and 20.5% were households with a female householder and no spouse or partner present. About 18.5% of all households were made up of individuals and 6.2% had someone living alone who was 65 years of age or older. The average household size was 3.11, and the average family size was 3.60.

There were 1,219 housing units, of which 6.3% were vacant. The homeowner vacancy rate was 1.5% and the rental vacancy rate was 6.2%.

Racial composition as of the 2020 census
Race	Number	Percent
White	3,139	91.9%
Black or African American	21	0.6%
American Indian and Alaska Native	7	0.2%
Asian	24	0.7%
Native Hawaiian and Other Pacific Islander	0	0.0%
Some other race	17	0.5%
Two or more races	206	6.0%
Hispanic or Latino (of any race)	59	1.7%

=== Income and poverty ===
According to the U.S. Census American Community Survey, for the period 2016-2020 the estimated median annual income for a household in the village was $82,716, and the median income for a family was $95,625. About 16.1% of the population were living below the poverty line, including 17.3% of those under age 18 and 10.2% of those age 65 or over. About 64.1% of the population were employed, and 25.3% had a bachelor's degree or higher.

=== 2010 census ===
As of the census of 2010, there were 3,234 people, 1,079 households, and 823 families living in the village. The population density was 2,046.8 inhabitants per square mile (790.3/km^{2}). There were 1,190 housing units at an average density of 753.2 per square mile (290.8/km^{2}). The racial makeup of the village was 96.9% White, 0.6% African American, 0.4% Native American, 0.4% Asian, 0.1% from other races, and 1.6% from two or more races. Hispanic or Latino of any race were 1.2% of the population.

There were 1,079 households, of which 46.2% had children under the age of 18 living with them, 57.2% were married couples living together, 13.2% had a female householder with no husband present, 5.9% had a male householder with no wife present, and 23.7% were non-families. 19.4% of all households were made up of individuals, and 7.1% had someone living alone who was 65 years of age or older. The average household size was 3.00 and the average family size was 3.45.

The median age in the village was 33.2 years. 32.5% of residents were under the age of 18; 7.7% were between the ages of 18 and 24; 28.3% were from 25 to 44; 23.8% were from 45 to 64; and 7.7% were 65 years of age or older. The gender makeup of the village was 50.3% male and 49.7% female.

=== 2000 census ===
As of the census of 2000, there were 2,790 people, 960 households, and 750 families living in the village. The population density was 1,754.7 inhabitants per square mile (677.5/km^{2}). There were 1,020 housing units at an average density of 641.5 per square mile (247.7/km^{2}). The racial makeup of the village was 98.21% White, 0.57% African American, 0.14% Native American, 0.14% Asian, 0.14% Pacific Islander, 0.07% from other races, and 0.72% from two or more races. Hispanic or Latino of any race were 0.36% of the population.

There were 960 households, out of which 43.5% had children under the age of 18 living with them, 61.8% were married couples living together, 10.6% had a female householder with no husband present, and 21.8% were non-families. 17.6% of all households were made up of individuals, and 7.8% had someone living alone who was 65 years of age or older. The average household size was 2.91 and the average family size was 3.30.

In the village, the population was spread out, with 31.4% under the age of 18, 7.7% from 18 to 24, 33.8% from 25 to 44, 18.1% from 45 to 64, and 9.0% who were 65 years of age or older. The median age was 33 years. For every 100 females there were 100.1 males. For every 100 females age 18 and over, there were 96.1 males.

The median income for a household in the village was $47,553, and the median income for a family was $50,926. Males had a median income of $32,917 versus $25,000 for females. The per capita income for the village was $17,617. About 6.3% of families and 7.6% of the population were below the poverty line, including 10.6% of those under age 18 and none of those age 65 or over.

== Notable people ==
- Les Backman, Major League Baseball pitcher
- Dana Stubblefield, Former NFL defensive tackle.
