= Transportation in Cincinnati =

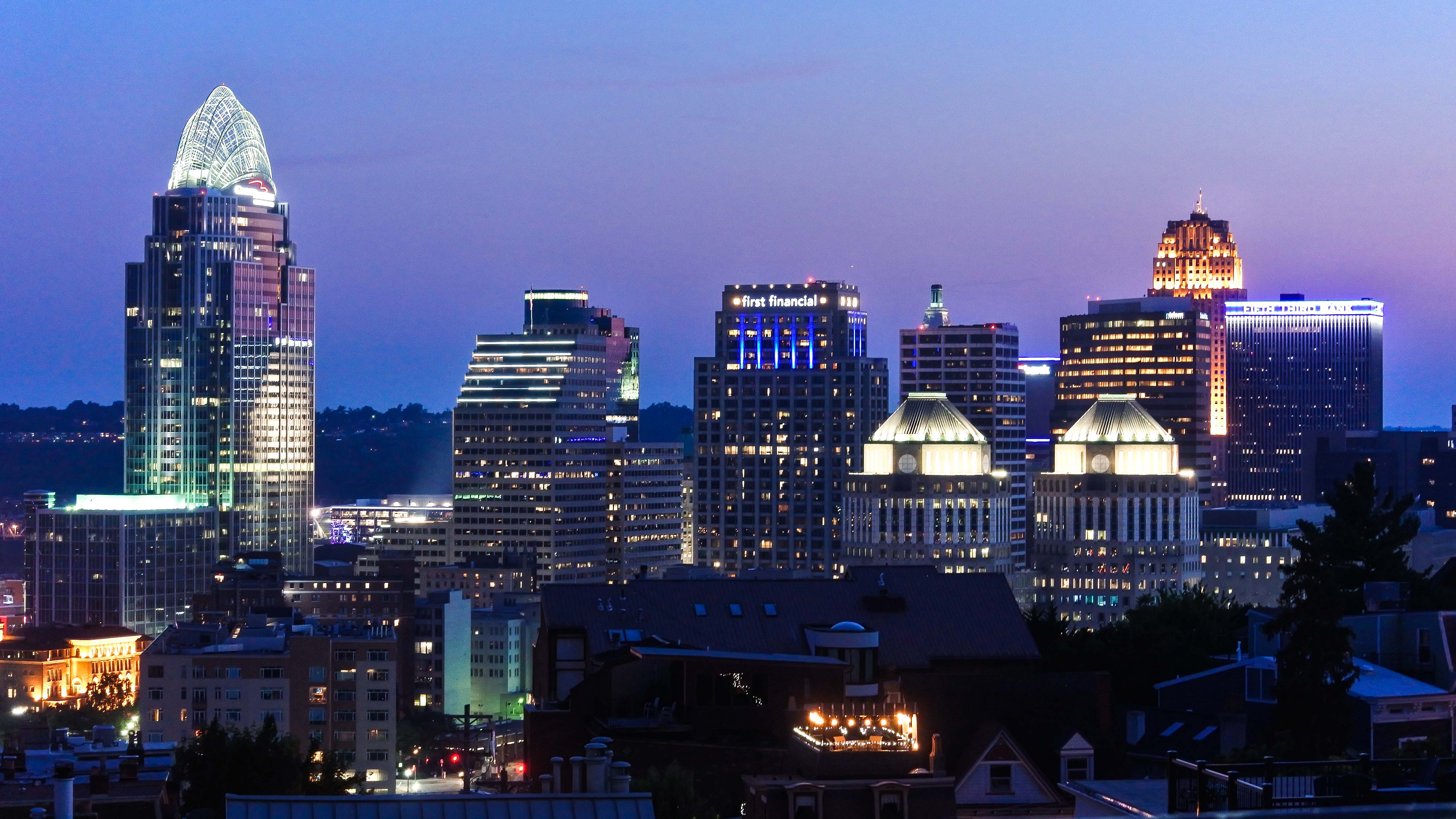
Downtown Cincinnati in July 2019

Transportation in Cincinnati includes sidewalks, roads, public transit, bicycle paths, and regional and international airports. Most trips are made by car, with transit and bicycles having a relatively low share of total trips; in a region of just over 2 million people, less than 80,000 trips are made with transit on an average day. The city is sliced by three major interstate highways, I-71, I-74 and I-75, and circled by a beltway several miles out from the city limits. The region is served by two separate transit systems, one on each side of the river. SORTA, on the Ohio side is about six times larger than TANK on the Kentucky side.

The transit system is largely radial with almost all lines terminating at Downtown Cincinnati. The city's numerous hills precluded the regular street grid common to many cities built up in the 19th Century, and outside of the downtown basin, regular street grids are rare. Exceptions do exist in patches of flat land where they are typically small and oriented according to the local topography rather than the cardinal directions.

== Roads ==
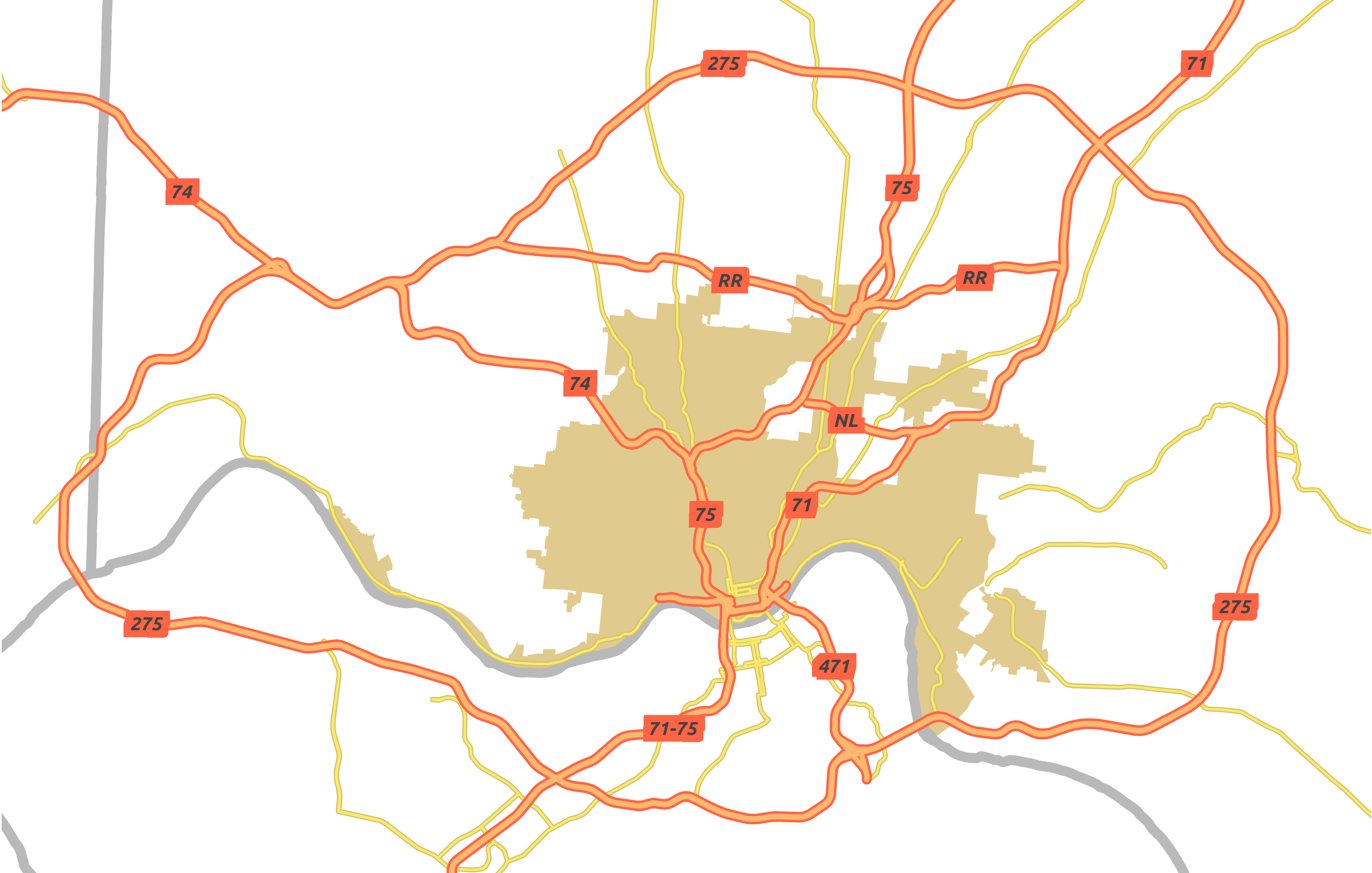
Highways of Metropolitan Cincinnati

The road network of Cincinnati includes three major interstate highways, one interstate bypass and one interstate spur and six U.S. highways.

The Brent Spence Bridge Corridor Project, with funding settled in late 2022, will construct a new double-deck companion bridge to carry interstate through-traffic, while the existing Brent Spence Bridge will be reconfigured for local traffic only, through Cincinnati and Covington. Approximately eight miles of improved roadways spanning Kentucky and Ohio will be constructed. The total project cost is estimated at $3.6 billion, and a federal grant of $1.6 billion was awarded in late 2022 to the project, with the remaining cost evenly split between Ohio and Kentucky. Major construction is expected to begin in 2026. Beshear said there will be no tolls.

=== Interstates ===
Cincinnati is served by three major interstate highways, one beltway, and one spur. Interstates 71, 74, and 75 are major routes connecting to Louisville and Lexington in Kentucky; Indianapolis; and Dayton and Columbus in Ohio. Interstate 471 connects a portion of Northern Kentucky to downtown Cincinnati.

- Interstate 71 splits off from Interstate 75 near the Brent Spence Bridge and heads eastward through Fort Washington Way. It junctions Interstate 471 before heading northeast towards Mt. Adams and Walnut Hills. It has major junctions with SR 562 (Norwood Lateral) and SR 126 (Ronald Reagan Cross County Highway).
- Interstate 74 begins at Interstate 75 west of downtown and proceeds towards Indiana. Its only primary junction is with Interstate 275.
- Interstate 75 is a north–south route through the Mill Creek valley. It enters from Kentucky on the Brent Spence Bridge, where it overlaps Interstate 71. Interstate 71 splits eastward at an elevated junction immediately north of the Ohio River. Interstate 75 has major junctions with Interstate 74, SR 562 (Norwood Lateral) and SR 126 (Ronald Reagan Cross County Highway).
- Interstate 275 serves as the metropolitan area's outer-belt and is currently the longest loop highway in the country. It has major junctions with all major interstate highways that radiate from the city.
- Interstate 471 is a spur that begins at the eastern terminus of Fort Washington Way and proceeds southward into Kentucky, where it terminates at the junction of Interstate 275 and US 27.

=== Notable expressways ===
Significant local routes maintained and managed at the municipal level include the Mill Creek Expressway (Interstate 75), Fort Washington Way (Interstate 71), the Ronald Reagan Cross County Highway, the Norwood Lateral Expressway, Columbia Parkway, and the Sixth Street Expressway.

The downtown area features a system of viaducts with names such as Western Hills, Ida, and formerly Waldvogel.

=== U.S. highways ===
Cincinnati is served by several U.S. highways:

- US 25 (only exists on the Clay Wade Bailey Bridge within Ohio, and is Kentucky maintained)
- US 27
- US 42
- US 52
- US 127
- US 22
- US 50
  - Columbia Parkway
  - Sixth Street Expressway

=== State routes ===
- SR 3 (Montgomery Rd.)
- SR 4 (Paddock Rd.)
- SR 32 (extends east from Cincinnati across southern Ohio to West Virginia)
- SR 125 (Beechmont Avenue/Ohio Pike)
- SR 126 (Ronald Reagan Cross County Highway)
- SR 264 (Glenway Ave.)
- SR 561
- SR 562 (Norwood Lateral)

=== Future routes ===
Proposed Eastern Bypass

A 68-mile eastern bypass is proposed to run east of I-275 and improve traffic flow in the Cincinnati area. The route would intersect the following routes:

I-75 near Crittenden, Kentucky
KY 17 in Atwood, Kentucky
KY 117 in Kenton, Kentucky
US 27 in Aspen Grove, Kentucky
KY 9 in Mentor, Kentucky
US 52 in Point Pleasant, Ohio
SR 125 east of Amelia, Ohio
SR 32 east of Batavia, Ohio
US 50 in Owensville, Ohio
SR 131 west of Newtonsville, Ohio
SR 28 east of Goshen, Ohio
US 22 / SR 3 west of Morrow, Ohio
I-71 in South Lebanon, Ohio
SR 48 in South Lebanon, Ohio
US 42 west of Lebanon, Ohio
SR 63 west of Lebanon, Ohio
SR 122 north of Lebanon, Ohio
I-75 west of Morrow, Ohio

=== Mile Road System ===
Some metropolitan streets in a few adjacent municipalities (including Eastern Cincinnati) participate in a road naming scheme that derives certain road names from the proximity of their origin to the mouth of the Little Miami River. Two Mile Road is approximately two miles from the mouth of the Little Miami, Four Mile Road is approximately four miles away, and so on. Thus far, the following roads are established: Two Mile Road, Sutton Road (formerly Three Mile Road), Four Mile Road, Five Mile Road, Eight Mile Road, Nine Mile Road, and Ten Mile Road.

A project to reroute and extend Five Mile Road into what would have been an invaluable traffic artery for the Eastern villages and townships was begun, but it was ultimately left unfinished. The project was to extend Five Mile Road through the Village of Newtown, thereby connecting the major thoroughfares of OH-125 (Beechmont Avenue), US-32 (Batavia Pike), US-50 (Wooster Pike), and US-52 (Kellogg Avenue). This would more effectively integrated Anderson Township and Newtown with neighboring Plainville as well as Mariemont, Indian Hill, and Terrace Park (by extension). Land and was acquired by the Township for this express purpose, but adjacent property owners successfully lobbied and stalled the project until Township officials ultimately relented. Land acquired was instead ceded to its parks department, which still maintains a spacious trail for pedestrians and cyclists in the obvious place where the expressway currently stops abruptly. The historic original route still exists, functioning as a spur under the name Old Five Mile Road.

With the narrow exception of Two Mile Road and Four Mile Road, all roads currently have their origins at their respective intersections with US-52.

=== Defunct routes ===
Bypass 50

Bypass 50 ran concurrently with State route 126 heading east from Springfield Pike (Route 4) in Woodlawn and was known as Glendale-Milford Road then Pfeiffer Road after crossing Kenwood Road. Continuing to its Pfieffer Road terminus at Montgomery Road the route turned south then east at Remington Road. The road changed names back to Glendale-Milford entering Miamiville, then turned south heading through Camp Dennison before terminating at Route 50 (Wooster Pike) in Terrace Park, yards from the Hamilton-Clermont County line. The route was discontinued in 1997 when the Ronald Reagan highway was opened and designated at State Highway 126

== Bicycles ==
Cincinnati Bike Map

Red Bike, a public bicycle-sharing system, opened in the fall of 2014. The University of Cincinnati has operated a small bike-share program for several years.

== Public transportation ==
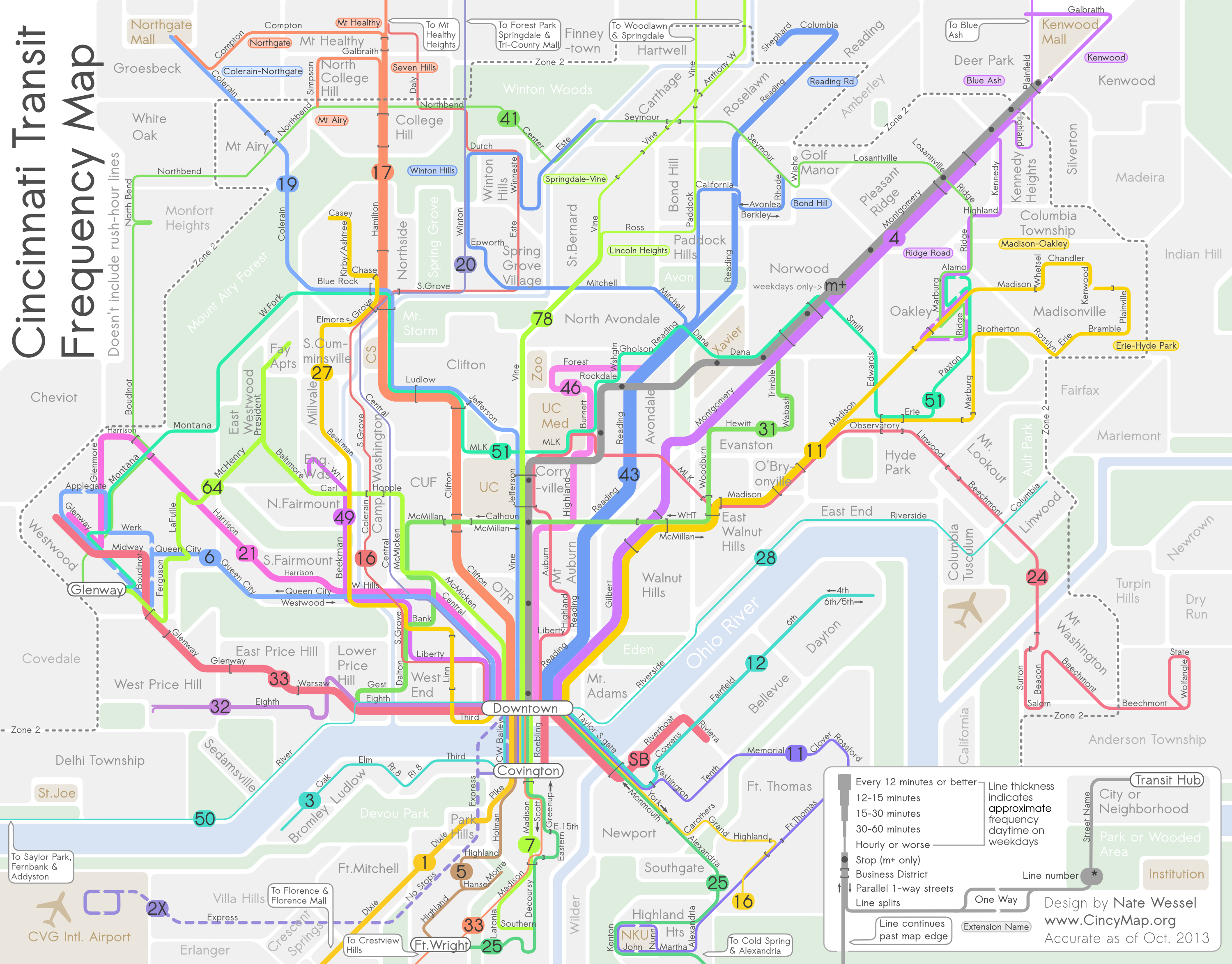
Metro Cincinnati transit map

=== Buses ===
Cincinnati is served by buses run by the Southwest Ohio Regional Transit Authority (SORTA), the Transit Authority of Northern Kentucky (TANK) and the Clermont Transportation Connection.

Almost all transit lines, including those of TANK are centered on Downtown Cincinnati. This has led many people to criticize the system for being overly radial and reliant on transfers in Downtown. Several lines in Ohio, generally those ending in '1'(31, 51, 41) don't go downtown at all but provide a link between the radial arms created by the other lines.

SORTA is significantly larger than TANK, operating more lines, at higher frequencies, and carrying about six times as many passengers on an average day.

Most of SORTA's funding comes from the City of Cincinnati, and so the most intensive transit service is confined to the city boundaries. Outside of the city is considered Zone 2, and a higher fare is charged. The Clermont Transportation Connection and Warren County Transit partially fund SORTA routes that extend into Clermont County and Warren County, respectively. SORTA's paratransit services are partially subsidized by Hamilton County. TANK is funded by Campbell and Kenton counties.

SORTA and TANK primarily operate 40 foot diesel buses, though some lines are served by longer articulated or hybrid engine buses. Paratransit services generally make use of minibuses.

=== Streetcars ===
A single streetcar line, the Connector, runs between The Banks, Downtown, and Findlay Market in Over-the-Rhine in a 3.6-mile (5.8 km) loop. It opened in 2016. Future extensions have been proposed to the Uptown area, home to the University of Cincinnati, the regional hospitals, and the Cincinnati Zoo; and to Northern Kentucky.

Streetcars were the main form of transportation in the city. The first electric streetcars began operation in 1889, and at its maximum, the streetcar system had 222 miles (357 km) of track and carried more than 100 million passengers per year. With the advent of inexpensive automobiles and improved roads, transit ridership declined in the 20th century and the streetcar system closed in 1951.

=== Public steps ===
The public stairways in Cincinnati are a historic mode of transportation in the hilly city. In addition to practical use linking hillside neighborhoods, the approximately 400 stairways are often used for exercise.

=== Intercity transportation ===
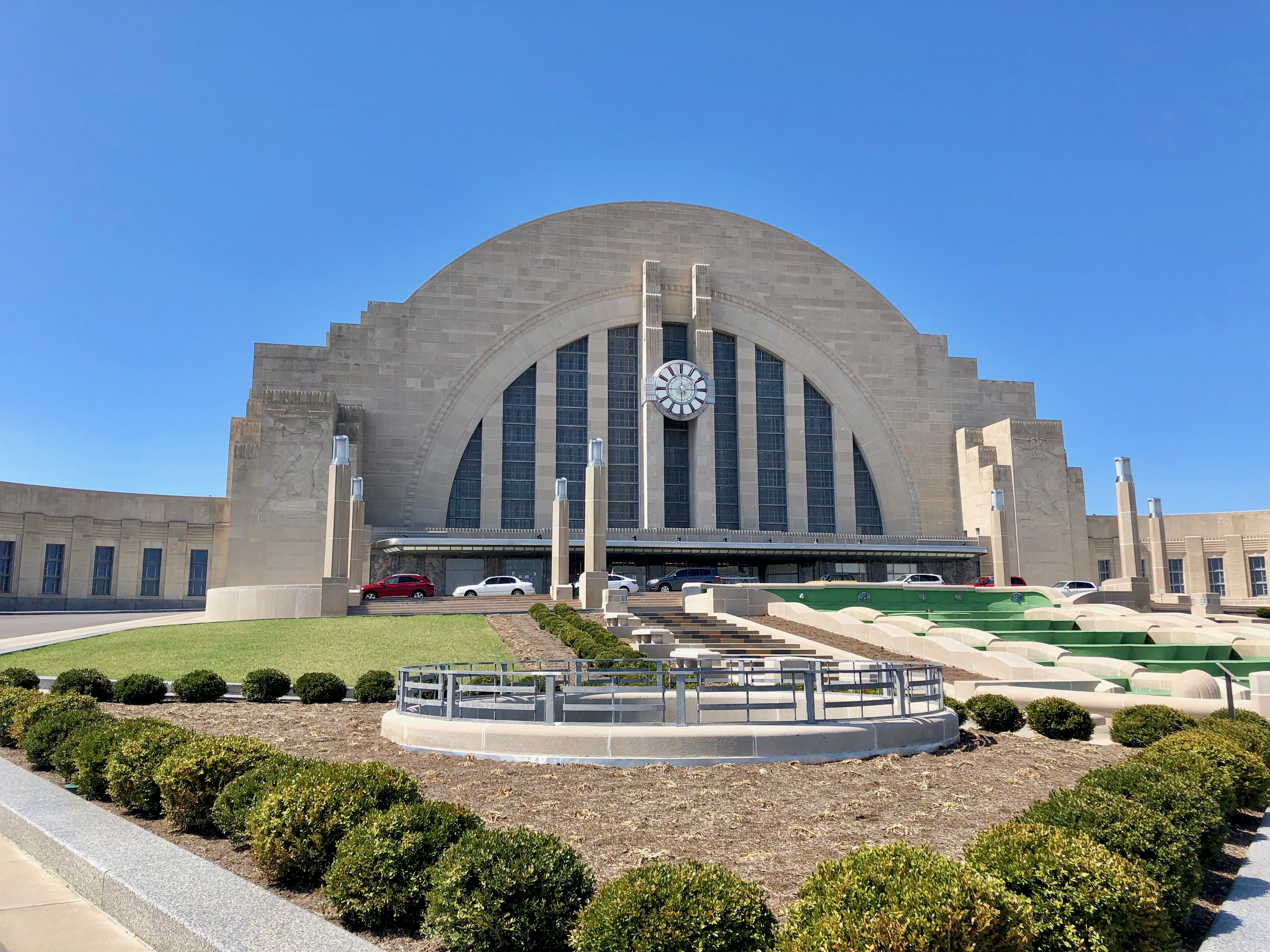
Cincinnati Union Terminal serves Amtrak's Cardinal line and houses several museums

Amtrak's Cardinal train travels to Chicago and Indianapolis to the northwest and to Washington, D.C., Philadelphia and New York City to the east. It goes in each direction three times each week and arrives in Cincinnati between 1 and 3:30am. Its ticket office and station are at Cincinnati Union Terminal.

Greyhound operates a 24-hour bus terminal (formerly in Downtown Cincinnati, now in Arlington Heights) with trips to all major nearby cities and connections to the rest of the country. Regional carriers GO Bus and Barron's Bus also serve the terminal. For the last couple of years, Megabus has also operated several trips a week between Cincinnati and a few major cities in the midwest. Chinatown bus lines connect Cincinnati with New York City.

=== Abandoned subway ===
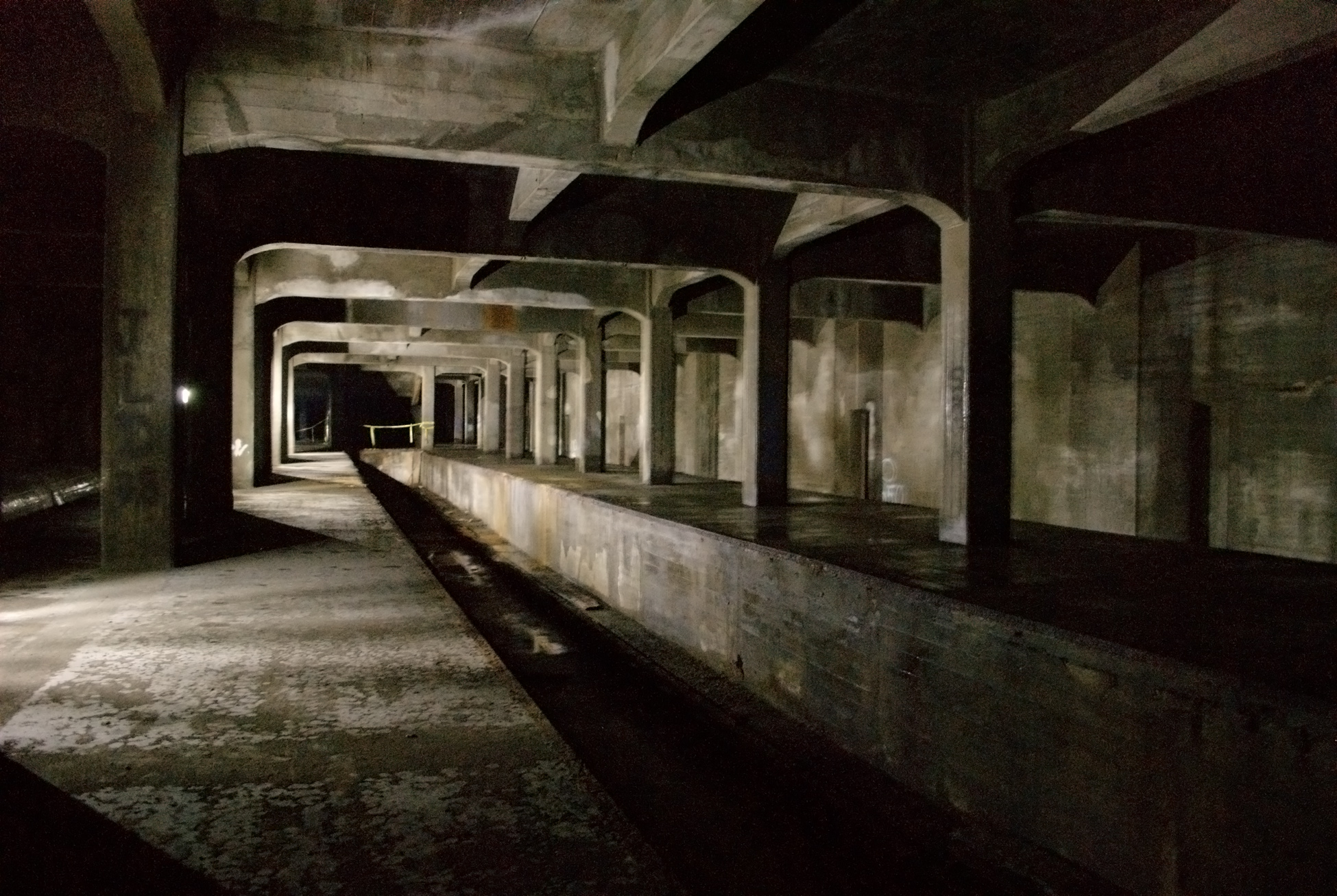
Cincinnati Subway - Race St. Station

Cincinnati has an incomplete subway system. Construction stopped in 1924 when unexpected post-World War I inflation doubled the cost of construction and the funds originally set aside weren't enough to complete the project. There have been several attempts in recent decades by the SORTA to use the subway tunnels for a light rail system, but ballot initiatives to generate funds for such projects have so far all failed. The most recent attempt was the 2002 MetroMoves plan which would have generated $2.7 billion for a comprehensive transit plan, but it failed by a 2–1 margin. Today the subway is used as a conduit for fiber optic and water lines. It's sealed off from the public, but is occasionally used by urban explorers and the homeless.

== Bridges ==
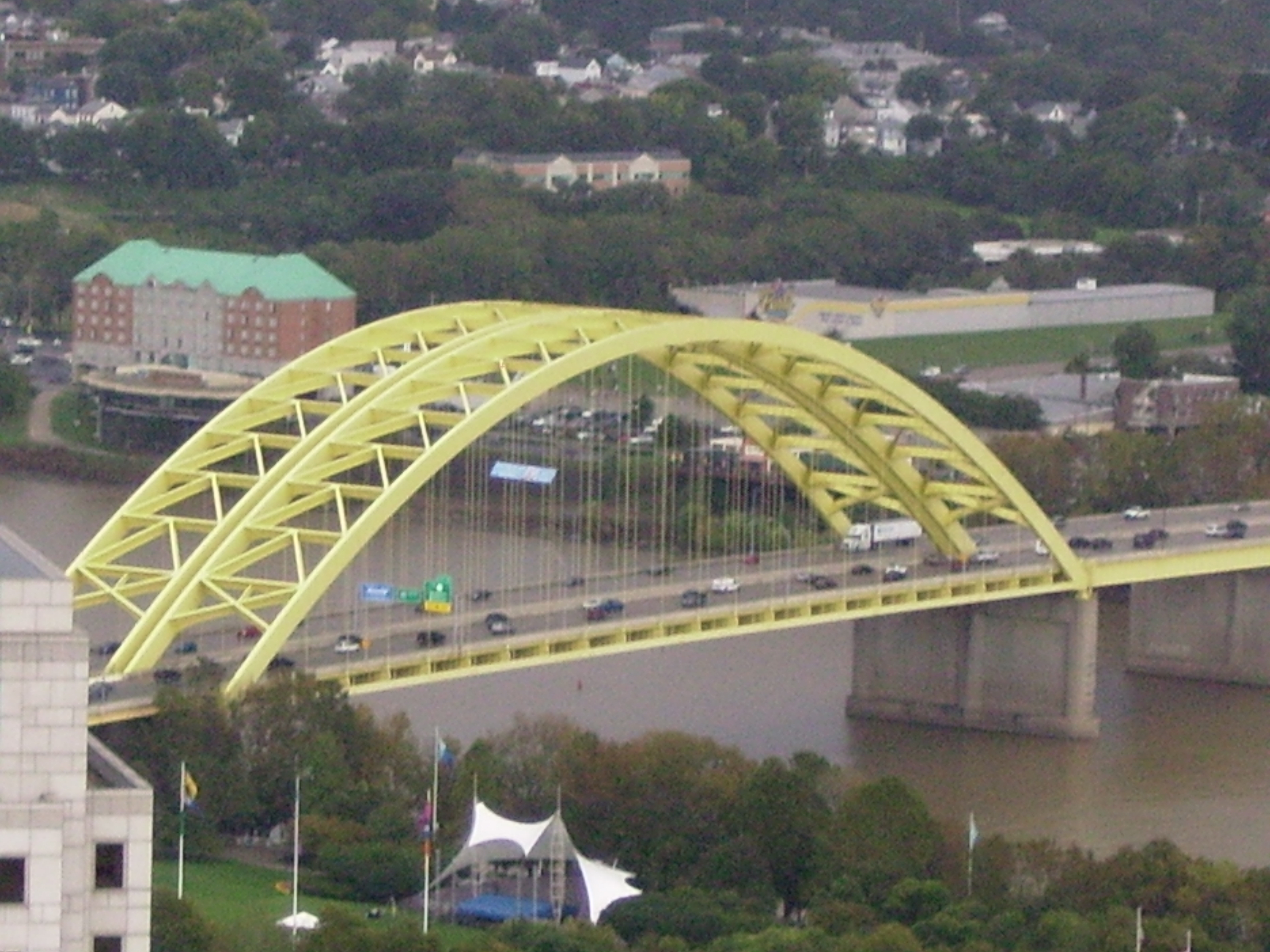
The Daniel Carter Beard Bridge is more commonly called the "Big Mac" bridge because of its resemblance to McDonald's iconic arches.

The city has a river ferry and many bridges. The Anderson Ferry has been in continuous operation since 1817. Cincinnati's major bridges include:

- The Newport Southbank Bridge (a.k.a. the Purple People Bridge because of its status as a pedestrian-only bridge as well as its color)
- The John A. Roebling Suspension Bridge Opened in 1866, this bridge was the prototype for the Brooklyn Bridge, also designed by Roebling.
- The Daniel Carter Beard Bridge (a.k.a. the Big Mac bridge for its yellow arches, reminiscent of the McDonald's logo) carries I-471 and connects Cincinnati with Newport, Kentucky
- The Brent Spence Bridge A double-decker truss bridge carrying I-71/75 connecting Cincinnati with Covington, Kentucky
- The Clay Wade Bailey Bridge
- The Taylor-Southgate Bridge
- The Combs-Hehl Bridge a twin-span truss, part of the I-275 loop and commonly called "The 275 Bridge", it travels through Fort Thomas, Kentucky and connects to the neighborhood of California, the easternmost neighborhood in the city limits.

== Airports ==
Cincinnati/Northern Kentucky International Airport (IATA: CVG) is the major international airport serving the metropolitan area and is located across the river in Hebron, Kentucky. CVG stands for Covington, the nearest and largest city by the airport when it was built. Although CVG serves Cincinnati, many people do not know it is actually located in Kentucky. The airport is focus city for Allegiant Air. The airport also serves as a global cargo super-hub for DHL Express, and is the 40th busiest airport in the world with cargo operations included. The city has three other airports; Lunken Airport, a municipal airfield used for smaller business jets and private planes; the Butler County Regional Airport, located between Fairfield and Hamilton, which ranks just behind Lunken in business jets and has the largest private aircraft capacity of the Cincinnati area; Cincinnati West Airport, a smaller airport located in Harrison, Ohio.

CVG Airport, along with the two other regional international airports, Dayton International Airport 78 miles (130 km) north, and John Glenn Columbus International Airport 128 miles (210 km) northeast, form an important regional transportation network. Combined, they anchor the corners of a triangular region that serves about 50% of the population of Ohio and about 10% of Kentucky. The region encompasses over 6,000 square miles (16,000 km^{2}) with about 50% available for development.

== Commerce ==
According to Forbes Magazine, Cincinnatians spend 20% of their income on transit, which makes the city the sixth most expensive city for commuting in the United States. As of 2003, the port of Cincinnati is ranked 5th by trip ton-miles for an inland port.

Several freight railroads service Cincinnati, the largest being CSX Transportation which operates a railroad yard west of Interstate 75. Other railroads include Norfolk Southern, which operates a large intermodal yard in the west end neighborhood of Queensgate and the Indiana & Ohio Railroad which operates several small predecessor yards throughout the city.

== See also ==
- Miami and Erie Canal
- Plug-in electric vehicles in Ohio § Cincinnati
