= Mill Creek (Ohio) =

Stream in southwest Ohio, U.S.

Coordinates: 39.1006°N 84.5416°W

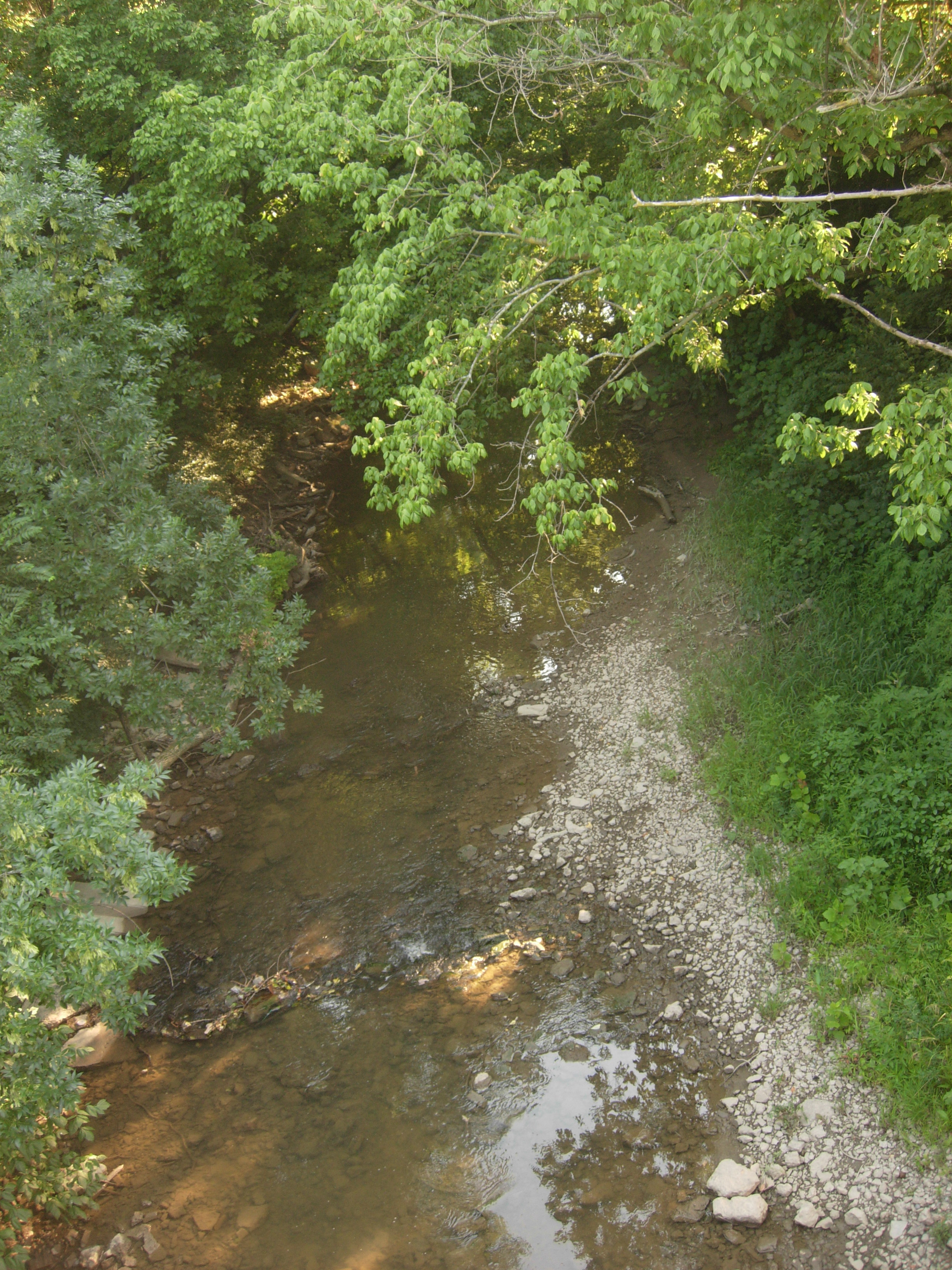
Mill Creek

The Mill Creek is a stream in southwest Ohio. It flows 28.4 miles (45.7 km) southwest and south from its headwaters in Liberty Township of Butler County through central Hamilton County and the heart of Cincinnati into the Ohio River just west of downtown. The section of Interstate 75 through Cincinnati is known as the Mill Creek Expressway.

The Mill Creek Valley is a remnant of the Deep Stage Ohio River from the days of the Last Glacial Maximum. The stream, with its water power and valley, were important to the development of Cincinnati. Then, for a time, the steep hillsides that surround the creek limited expansion and gave impetus to the free growth of surrounding communities that were over that barrier. Finally, inclined planes solved the problem, before highways and automobiles eliminated it.

== Pollution ==
Throughout Cincinnati's history, Mill Creek has been the scene of heavy industry. At the turn of the 20th-century, it was seen as "a great open city sewer". In 1997, it was described as "the most endangered urban river in America."

== Discharge ==
A USGS stream gauge on the creek at Mitchell Avenue in Cincinnati recorded a mean annual discharge of 115.9 cubic feet per second (3.28 m^{3}/s) during the four combined water years 1942-1943 and 1946–1947.

== Crossings ==
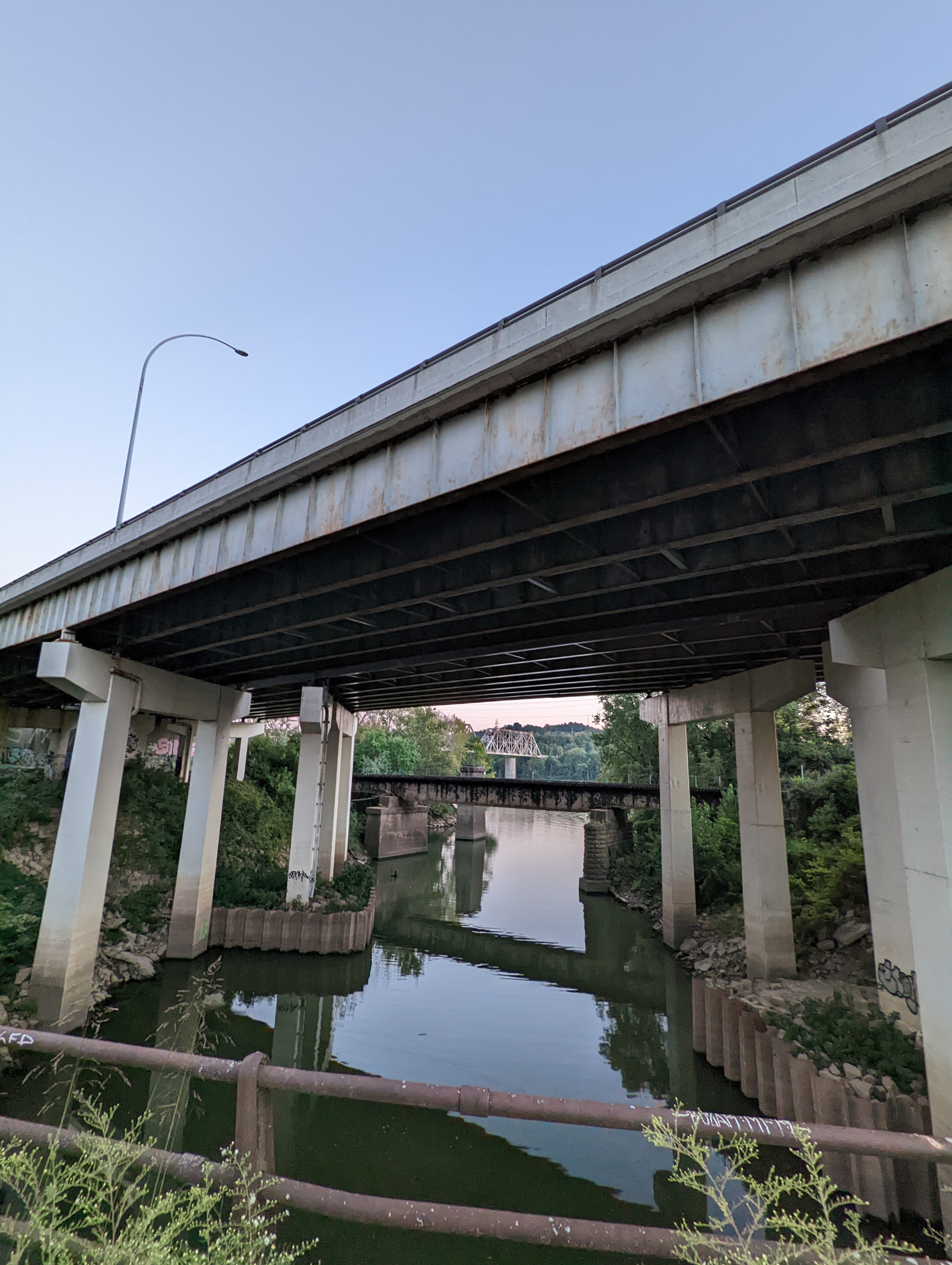
The Mill Creek empties into the Ohio River in Queensgate.

A number of substantial viaducts cross the valley of the Mill Creek high above the water level, as well as many bridges. From south to north, the crossings are:

- CSX Transportation rail spur
- Sixth Street Expressway/Waldvogel Viaduct (U.S. Route 50/State Route 264)
- Sixth Street and the Indiana and Ohio Railway "Ditch Track"
- CSX "Oklahoma Track" on the Indiana Subdivision
- CSX "Cincinnati Industrial Track" (former Toledo Subdivision main track)
- Eighth Street Viaduct
- Gest Street
- Western Hills Viaduct
- Hopple Street Viaduct
- Millcreek Road
- Spring Grove Avenue
- Interstate 74/U.S. Route 27/U.S. Route 52
- Ludlow Viaduct (Hamilton Avenue) (US 127)
- CSX railroad
- Clifton Avenue
- Mitchell Avenue
- Rev Drive
- CSX Railroad
- Spring Grove Avenue
- Cognis Corporation pipe bridge
- CSX rail spur
- CSX railroad
- Cognis Corporation pipe bridge
- Cognis Corporation (private roadway)
- Cognis Corporation (private roadway)
- Cognis Corporation pipe bridge
- Cognis Corporation (private roadway)
- CSX rail spur
- Center Hill Avenue
- West Seymour Avenue
- West North Bend Road
- CSX Railroad
- Vine Street (SR 4)
- Anthony Wayne Avenue
- CSX Railroad
- Private roadway
- Interstate 75
- SR 126 eastbound (Ronald Reagan Highway)
- SR 126 westbound (Ronald Reagan Highway)
- East Galbraith Road
- Clark Road
- Koehler Avenue (Davis Street)
- Interstate 75
- West Benson Street (East Wyoming Avenue)
- Interstate 75
- West Columbia Avenue
- General Electric Aviation (private roadway)
- Norfolk Southern Railroad
- Formica Corporation (private roadway)
- Cunningham Drive
- Glendale-Milford Road
- Norfolk Southern Railroad
- Norfolk Southern Railroad
- Norfolk Southern Railroad
- Norfolk Southern Railroad
- Medallion Drive
- CSX Railroad
- East Sharon Road
- CSX Railroad
- East Kemper Road
- Interstate 275
- CSX Railroad
- East Crescentville Road
- Allen Road
- Village Centre Avenue
- Union Centre Boulevard
- West Chester Road

== See also ==
- List of rivers of Ohio
