= Ronald Reagan Cross County Highway =

Freeway in Hamilton County, Ohio, United States

Route information
- Maintained by Ohio Department of Transportation, Hamilton County Engineer's Office
- Length: 16.4 mi (26.4 km)
- Existed: 1958–present
- Component highways: CR 453 in Colerain Township; SR 126 from Colerain Township to Montgomery

Major junctions
- West end: I-275 in Colerain Township
- US 27 / SR 126 in Groesbeck; I-75 in Cincinnati; I-71 in Montgomery
- East end: US 22 / SR 3 / SR 126 in Montgomery

Location
- Country: United States
- State: Ohio
- Counties: Hamilton

Highway system
- Ohio State Highway System; Interstate; US; State; Scenic
- County roads in Ohio

Ronald Reagan Cross County Highway, formerly and locally known as Cross County Highway, is a west-east freeway in Hamilton County, Ohio, United States. It stretches 16.4 miles (26.4 km) from southern Colerain Township to Montgomery, connecting many of Cincinnati's northern suburbs to Interstate 71 and Interstate 75. State Route 126 is routed over most of the highway, while the remainder is a county-maintained road.

Cross County Highway was built by Hamilton County in seven stages from 1958 to 1997, costing $144 million. Highway revolts in Indian Hill and Crosby Township prevented it from crossing the entire county. On March 17, 1993, it became the first highway to be named after former U.S. President Ronald Reagan. Most of Ronald Reagan Highway was transferred to the state highway system in 1997.

== Route description ==
Ronald Reagan Highway begins as a 2.3-mile-long (3.7 km) county-maintained highway in Colerain Township, from Interstate 275 to Colerain Avenue (U.S. Route 27 / State Route 126) in the community of Groesbeck. This westernmost portion is designated as County Road 453; however, signs indicate this stretch solely by its name.

From Groesbeck, the highway carries State Route 126 along a path roughly parallel to the Norwood Lateral, State Route 562, to a junction with Montgomery Road (U.S. Route 22 / State Route 3) in Montgomery. A girder bridge over Hamilton Avenue (U.S. Route 127) in North College Hill is instrumented with over 640 sensors to serve as a field laboratory for University of Cincinnati researchers and Ohio Department of Transportation (ODOT) bridge engineers. Ronald Reagan Highway has a complex junction with Interstate 75 in Cincinnati's Roselawn and Hartwell neighborhoods: southbound I-75 traffic must take Galbraith Road through Arlington Heights and Reading to access Ronald Reagan Highway, and westbound Ronald Reagan traffic must use the same route to reach northbound I-75.

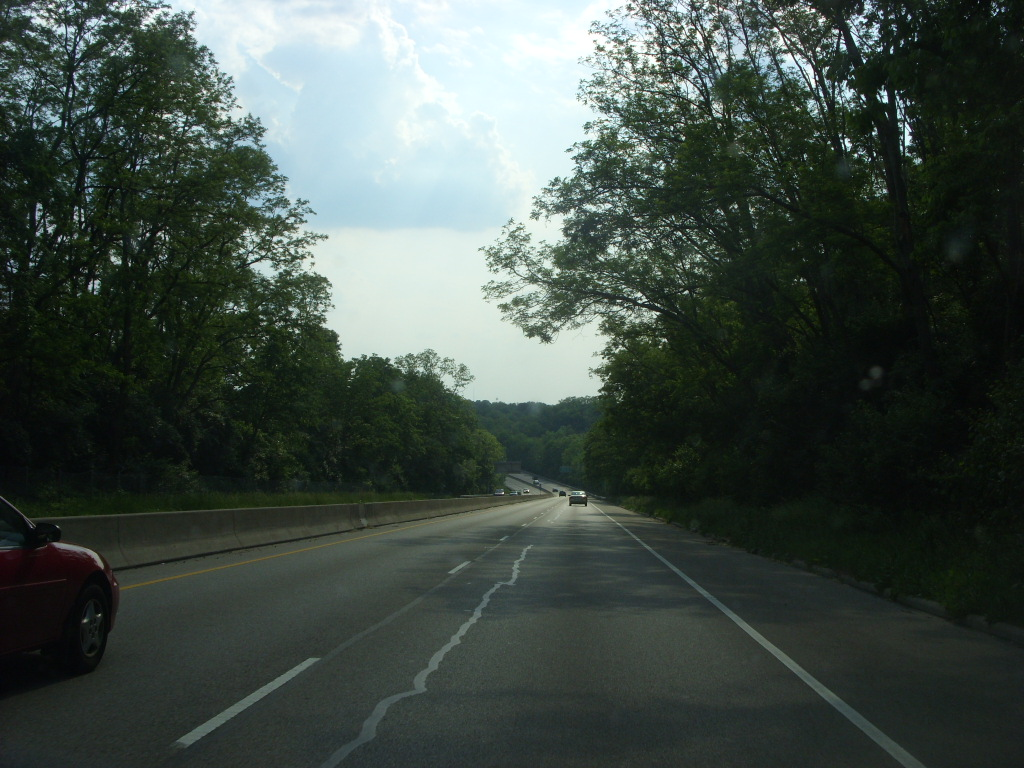
Ronald Reagan Highway at the Amberley Village, Reading, and Blue Ash corporation limits

The short, easternmost stretch from Interstate 71 to Montgomery Road is a limited-access road, with I-71 ramps forming signalized intersections with Ronald Reagan Highway. Ronald Reagan Highway's abrupt end at Montgomery Road is being converted to a turbo roundabout. State Route 126 continues north- and eastward on Montgomery Road through Montgomery and Indian Hill. A redwood sign commemorating the dedication of Ronald Reagan Cross County Highway by former First Lady Nancy Reagan stands at the highway's eastern terminus in the Montgomery Heritage District.

The majority of Ronald Reagan Highway, between Interstates 275 and 71, is included in the National Highway System (NHS). The NHS is a network of highways that are identified as being most important for the economy, mobility, and defense of the nation. The entirety of Ronald Reagan Highway has two lanes in each direction, with speed limits ranging from 50 to 60 miles per hour (80 to 95 km/h). ODOT's State Farm Safety Patrol vans provide assistance to stranded motorists along Cincinnati-area highways, including the entirety of Ronald Reagan Highway, on weekdays from 6:00 a.m. to 7:00 p.m.

Most guide signs for the highway's entrance ramps bear the name Ronald Reagan Highway, sometimes abbreviated Reagan Highway, rather than control cities. However, signs at the ramps from Interstate 71 onto Ronald Reagan Highway indicate Blue Ash as the westbound destination and Montgomery as the eastbound destination.

== History ==
=== East Side planning and construction ===
In the 1948 Cincinnati Metropolitan Master Plan, a short "modified expressway" (limited-access road) connects the "Proposed Cincinnati Metropolitan Airport" to the Northeast Expressway.

Cross County Highway was conceived in the 1940s as a 5-mile-long (8.0 km) connector from the Mill Creek Expressway (Interstate 75) to the Blue Ash Airport, which was expected to become Cincinnati's metropolitan commercial airport. In 1950, the concept was upgraded to an expressway; five years later, it grew into a 22-mile-long (35 km) lateral that would span the proposed Circumferential Highway (Interstate 275). The project, originally estimated at $30 million, was intended to connect the east and west sides of town and relieve congestion on Galbraith Road (State Route 126). In 1959, amid the success of the Greater Cincinnati Airport in Northern Kentucky, officials dropped plans to expand Blue Ash Airport and connect Cross County directly to the airport.

The first leg of Cross County Highway, a 1.3-mile (2.1 km) stretch from Ridge Road to Galbraith Road, was built between 1957 and 1958 and cost $800,000. In 1965, a year after Hamilton County voters passed a one-mill tax levy for Cross County expansion, the highway was extended from Ridge Road 2.7 miles (4.3 km) east to Kenwood Road for $2.9 million. Then, in 1968, it was extended 0.7 miles (1.1 km) further east to Montgomery Road, through the back nine holes of the Swaim Fields golf course, for $1.8 million.

In 1963, Hamilton County commissioners asked the Bureau of Public Roads to add the planned route of Cross County Highway to the Interstate Highway System. However, the designation of the Circle Freeway as Interstate 275 the previous fall meant that no additional Interstate mileage could be allocated to the state. The county's master plan, released the following year, envisioned major junctions at the Circle Freeway and Blue Rock Road; a U.S. 27 Expressway paralleling Colerain Avenue that was never built; the Mill Creek Expressway (Interstate 75); and the Northeast Expressway (Interstate 71).

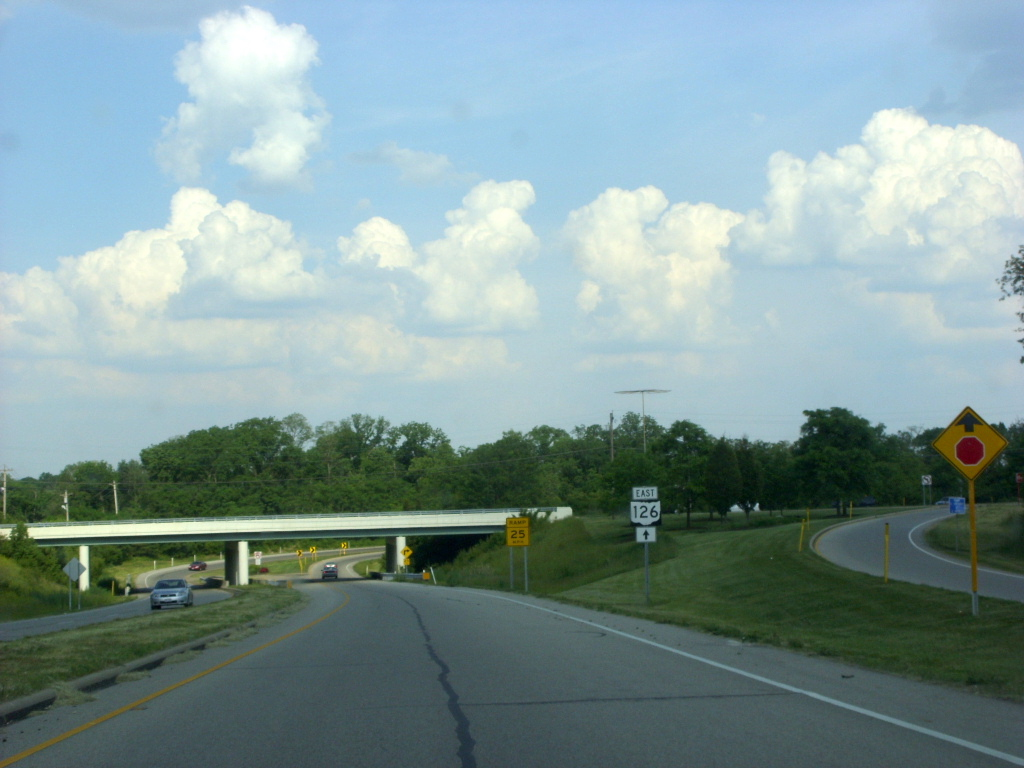
Ronald Reagan Highway's eastern terminus at Montgomery Road. The highway was originally planned to extend eastward from here through Indian Hill. This trumpet interchange was demolished in 2020 and replaced by a turbo roundabout in 2021.

Cross County Highway would have bypassed downtown Montgomery, extending eastward from Montgomery Road to connect with Remington Road halfway to Remington, thus providing better connectivity with Loveland and Milford. However, this easternmost segment was abandoned after Indian Hill refused to pass a resolution of consent, in an effort to preserve the wealthy village's undeveloped greenbelt. The highway's abrupt end in Montgomery contributed to a significant increase in traffic to that city: by 1978, Montgomery Road carried an estimated 18,000 cars per day. In 1984, Montgomery city officials unsuccessfully asked the county to either extend the highway east through Indian Hill or truncate it at Interstate 71. Ohio Department of Transportation (ODOT) straight-line diagrams continue to indicate the unbuilt Montgomery bypass as "future construction".

=== West Side extensions ===
In 1975, the westernmost 2.3 miles (3.7 km) of Cross County, from Interstate 275 to Colerain Avenue, was completed for $8.5 million. Two hundred homes were razed in Mount Healthy and North College Hill to make way for construction that would not begin until the mid-1990s. Three county-proposed routes were rejected by the two villages. Mount Healthy objected to one proposed path because it would have cut through Arlington Memorial Gardens, a major cemetery. In the meantime, the disconnected western segment saw virtually no traffic, encouraging a significant amount of graffiti on bridges and sound barriers.

From 1986 to 1990, Cross County was extended from Vine Street (State Route 4) east to Interstate 75 and East Galbraith Road for $47.7 million. A second phase, completed in 1993, took the highway from Vine Street west to West Galbraith Road for a further $19 million. At the time, these extensions were the most expensive highway project in state history. The project entailed rechanneling part of Mill Creek and building 18 bridges as well as several retaining walls and sound barriers. The right-of-way extended through the north end of the Hamilton County Fairgrounds, forcing the race track's relocation. Under the National Environmental Policy Act and Clean Water Act, portions of previously secured right of way were designated as wetland, forcing the county to secure additional land for environmental mitigation.

=== Renaming and completion ===
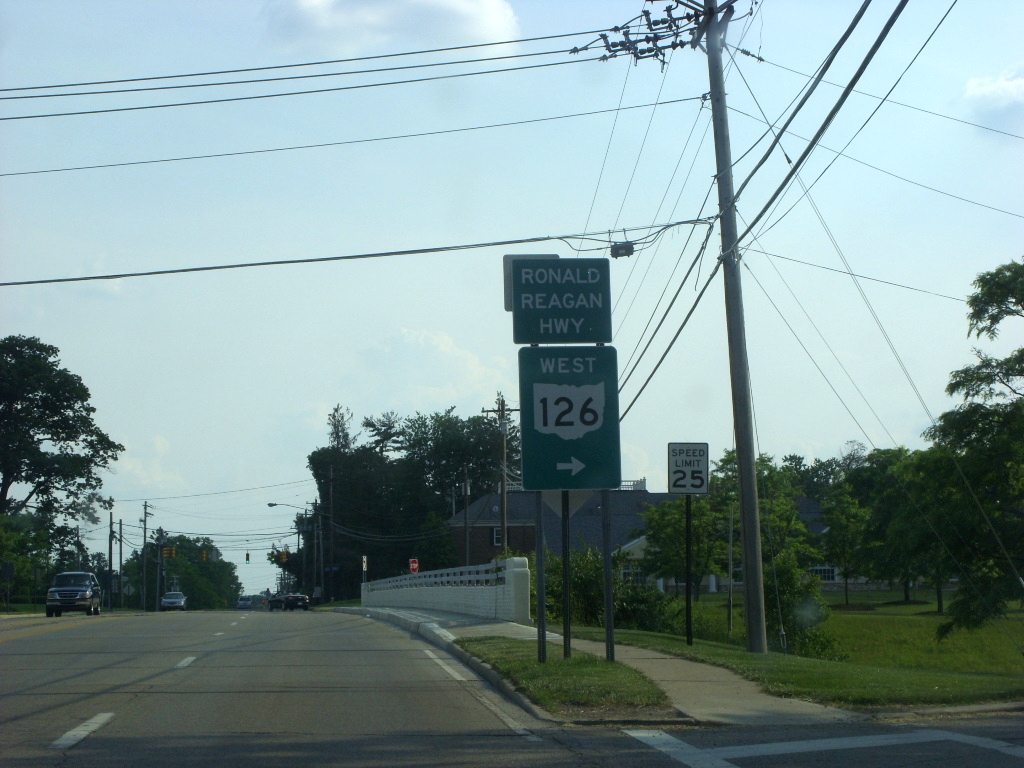
Signage on Montgomery Road directing motorists to Ronald Reagan Highway

On December 16, 1992, an all-Republican Board of County Commissioners, led by Commissioner John Dowlin, proposed naming Cross County Highway after Ronald Reagan, citing his strong showing in the county in the 1980 and 1984 presidential elections. Albert Sabin, the Cincinnati medical researcher, had also been considered for the honor. Reagan wrote to the Cincinnati Enquirer, thanking the county for its gesture and recounting his visit to a Ronald Reagan Pub in the Irish village of Ballyporeen:

… Don't get me wrong: I'm very proud of that pub, and I know what an honor it is. But I must admit when I thought of something being named after me, I was thinking more along the lines of a building or a highway! I'm honored and touched by the news and pleased to be associated with the city of Cincinnati. Thank you all.

— Ronald Reagan

The board officially renamed the highway on March 17, 1993, making it the first highway in the country to be named for Reagan. Since then, a number of highways and other landmarks have been named for him. Following the commissioners' action, local Democrats unsuccessfully pushed to rename the highway for radio and television broadcaster Ruth Lyons, while area residents contacted the Enquirer to suggest Sabin, Lyons, Paul Brown, or Ted Berry. The county raised nearly $15,000 in private donations to install "Reagan Highway" signage. The former President's daughter, Maureen Reagan, dedicated the newly extended highway on September 13, 1994.

Construction on the final 4.4-mile (7.1 km), $39.5 million segment began in October 1994 and completed in 1997. With the highway's completion, travel time across the county dropped from 40 minutes to 17. In recognition of County Engineer William Brayshaw's career-long work on the highway since the late 1950s, Hamilton County Commissioners temporarily renamed the highway in his honor for one day, November 5, 1997.

On October 28, 1997, ODOT took over the highway, except for the segment west of Colerain Avenue. State Route 126 was rerouted over the highway, while the former route along Kemper, Glendale Milford, Kenwood, and Cooper roads was returned to local authorities. As part of the rerouting, ODOT District 8 intended to replace the highway's name with the state route shield on all signage, a standard practice due to space constraints. However, Republican ODOT director Jerry Wray overruled the district office, keeping the President's name alongside the shield. Ronald Reagan Highway also became part of the regional ARTIMIS traffic management system in 1997.

=== Since completion ===
Traffic volume on Ronald Reagan Cross County Highway
Traffic section	Volume
Traffic section	2013
Entrance from I-275 east	8,812
Cheviot Road	27,521
US 27 / SR 126	19,570
Pippin Road	34,960
US 127	48,550
Winton Road	40,010
West Galbraith Road	53,130
I-75	46,720
US 42	38,100
East Galbraith Road	47,170
Ridge Road	50,280
Plainfield Road	48,500
Blue Ash Road / Kenwood Road	49,000
I-71	20,290
US 22 / SR 3 / SR 126	12,850
Volume: Average 24-hour traffic volume; Source: Ohio Department of Transportation

In October 1998, Brayshaw formally requested that ODOT extend Ronald Reagan Highway westward through rural Crosby Township over Blue Rock Road and New Haven Road, to connect the highway to Interstate 74 in Harrison. The roads would be improved in the short term, then eventually widened to a limited-access roadway with four to five lanes. Opposition from Crosby Township residents and trustees scuttled the plan. In 2001, Crosby Township again fought a plan by the county transportation improvement district to extend State Route 126 along the remainder of Ronald Reagan Highway, Blue Rock Road, and a new bypass around New Baltimore to a junction with State Route 128.

The highway's oldest 3.7 miles (6.0 km) were upgraded to modern freeway standards from spring 2000 to summer 2001 for $17.6 million. In addition to repaving the highway, ODOT replaced the center guardrail with a Jersey barrier, replaced curbs with wide shoulders, lengthened on- and off-ramps, and installed new overhead guide signage. West Side communities have seen significantly increased commercial development since the highway's completion, attributed in part to decreased congestion on surface streets.

Originally, Ronald Reagan Highway had an unsignalized, at-grade intersection at the Interstate 71 interchange, requiring traffic from southbound I-71 to cross continuous westbound lanes of Ronald Reagan Highway and merge into continuous eastbound lanes of that highway. In 2017, Montgomery city officials proposed turning the entire interchange into a turbo roundabout. Instead, traffic signals were added to the intersection in 2018.

In July 2020, the trumpet interchange and stub ramp at Montgomery Road were demolished, to be replaced with a two-lane turbo roundabout by June 2021 as part of an $8 million reconstruction project. The City of Montgomery plans to convert a 21-acre (8.5 ha) site abutting the planned roundabout, formerly the site of a car dealership, into the Montgomery Quarter, a $140 million mixed-use development.

== Accidents ==
Before traffic signals were installed in 2018, the intersection between eastbound Ronald Reagan Highway and the entrance ramp from southbound I-71 was the most crash-prone one-tenth-mile-long (0.16 km) stretch of roadway in the Greater Cincinnati area, with 666.39 collisions and 102.53 injuries and fatalities on average annually, The intersection between the westbound exit ramp of Ronald Reagan Highway and Colerain Avenue had 20 collisions in 2014 (none of which involved injuries), making it the fifth most crash-prone intersection on a Hamilton County road that year.

On August 15, 1998, a Cessna 152 departing from Blue Ash Airport bound for Cincinnati/Northern Kentucky International Airport ran out of fuel and collided with a car, killing three, as it attempted an emergency landing on Ronald Reagan Highway.

== Exit list ==
The entire route is in Hamilton County.

Location	mi	km	Exit	Destinations	Notes
Colerain Township	0.00	0.00		I-275 west to I-74 – Indianapolis	Interchange at exit 31 on I-275; westbound exit and eastbound entrance only
Colerain Township	0.85	1.37	—	Blue Rock Road to I-275 east	
Colerain Township	2.68 7.04	4.31 11.33	20	US 27 / SR 126 (Colerain Avenue)	Eastern end of county maintenance and western end of state maintenance; official mileages switch from internal county measurements to SR 126 mileposts; access to Northgate Mall
Mount Healthy–North College Hill city line	8.99	14.47	22	US 127 (Hamilton Avenue) – Mount Healthy, North College Hill	
Springfield Township	10.76	17.32	24A–B	Winton Road	Eastbound exit and westbound entrance only; access to Winton Woods
Springfield Township	11.44	18.41	25	Galbraith Road / Winton Road	Winton Road signed westbound only
Cincinnati	13.54	21.79	27A	I-75 south – Cincinnati	Signed exit 27 westbound; No access from I-75 southbound or from westbound SR 126 to I-75 northbound; Exit 10A on I-75
Cincinnati	13.92	22.40	27B	I-75 north – Dayton	Signed exit 27 westbound; No access from I-75 southbound or from westbound SR 126 to I-75 northbound; Exit 10A on I-75
Reading	14.96	24.08	28	US 42 (Reading Road) / Galbraith Road	Eastbound exit and westbound entrance only
Reading	15.38	24.75	28	Galbraith Road to US 42 (Reading Road) / I-75 north	Westbound exit and eastbound entrance only
Amberley	16.25	26.15	29	Ridge Road	
Blue Ash	18.13	29.18	31	Plainfield Road / Hunt Road	Access to University of Cincinnati Blue Ash College via Plainfield Road and former Cincinnati–Blue Ash Airport via Reed Hartman Highway
Blue Ash	18.77– 19.01	30.21– 30.59	32A	Blue Ash Road / Kenwood Road	
Montgomery–Sycamore Township line			East end of freeway		
Montgomery–Sycamore Township line	19.59	31.53	32B–C	I-71 – Cincinnati, Columbus	Exit 14 on I-71
Montgomery	20.20	32.51		US 22 / SR 3 (Montgomery Road) / SR 126	Roundabout; SR 126 continues north on Montgomery Road
1.000 mi = 1.609 km; 1.000 km = 0.621 mi: Incomplete access; Route transition

== See also ==
- Roads in Cincinnati
