= Lower Price Hill Community School =

Adult education center in Cincinnati, Ohio

Founded in 1971, the former Lower Price Hill Community School was an adult education center located in the Lower Price Hill neighborhood of Cincinnati, Ohio. It was originally housed in the basement of the St. Michael the Archangel Church, and later, moved into the third floor of the parish's nearby former school building. The Lower Price Hill Community School was founded by community organizers in the neighborhood and was originally focused on assisting the large population of Urban Appalachians in the neighborhood to obtain high school credentials through the GED exam.

In 2014, the historic campus of the Lower Price Hill Community School was renovated, and the organization was rebranded as Education Matters.

In 2022, Education Matters merged with Community Matters, a nonprofit organization also operating in the Lower Price Hill neighborhood. Current adult education programming includes GED preparation and testing, college access and tutoring support, and English for Speakers of Other Languages. It provides free tuition, onsite testing, transportation support, childcare services, and other support to students who attend classes.
