= Lower Price Hill Historic District =

Historic district in Ohio, United States

- U.S. National Register of Historic Places
- U.S. Historic district
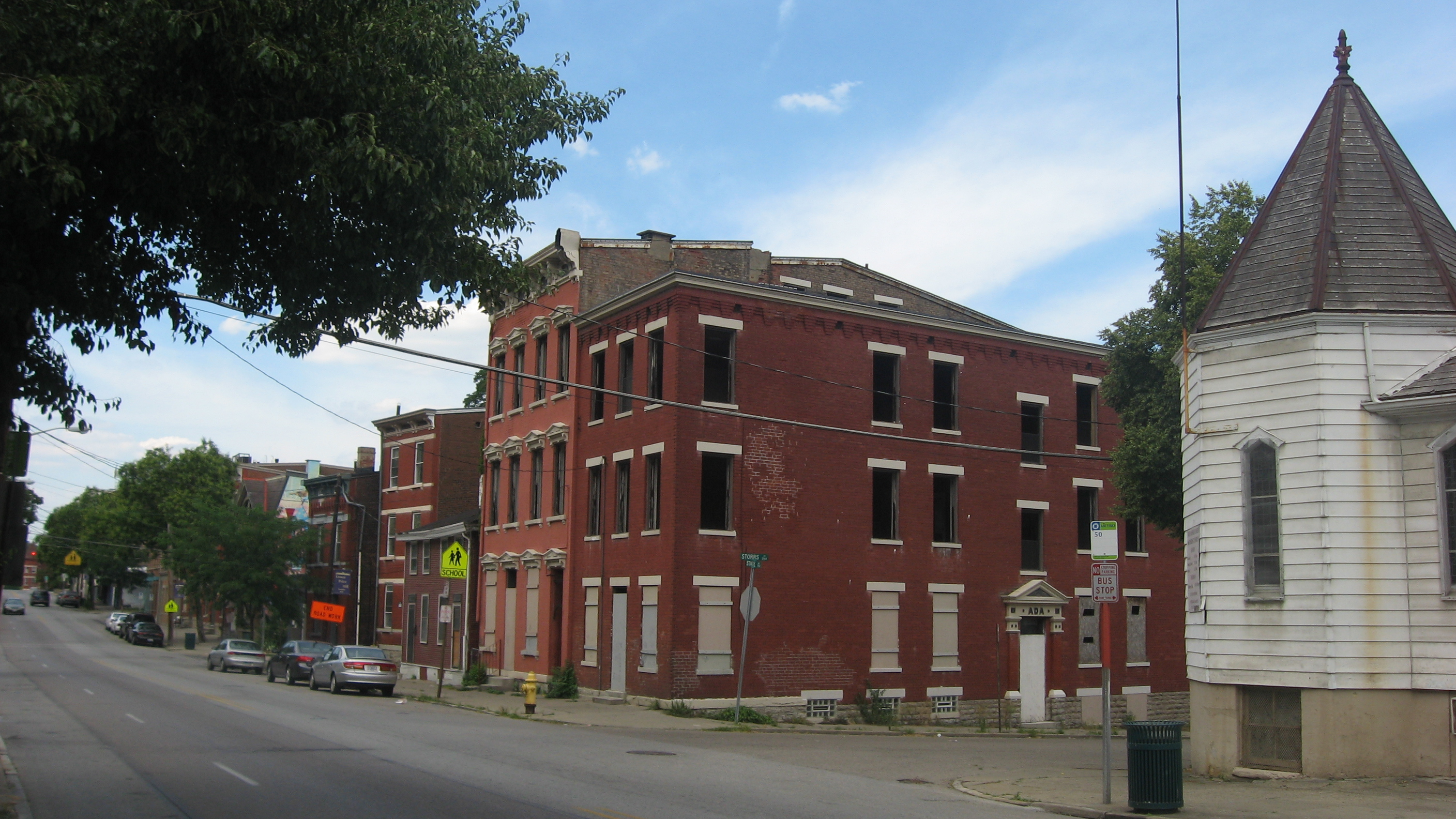
- State Avenue in the district

- Location within Ohio Location within the United States
- Location: Roughly bounded by W. 8th, State, Burns, and English St., Cincinnati, Ohio
- Coordinates: 39°6′13″N 84°33′8″W
- Area: 250 acres (1.0 km^{2})
- Architect: Hannaford, Samuel, & Sons
- Architectural style: Classical Revival, Italianate, Queen Anne
- NRHP reference No.: 88002536
- Added to NRHP: November 15, 1988

Lower Price Hill Historic District is a registered historic district in Price Hill, Cincinnati, Ohio, listed in the National Register on November 15, 1988. It is roughly bounded by West Eighth Street, State Street, Burns Street, and English Street. It is located just across the railroad tracks to the west of downtown Cincinnati. This region contains 196 contributing buildings, including single and multiple dwellings, as well as a few businesses. Lower Price Hill is served by the Lower Price Hill Community School.

== History ==
In the 19th century the Mill Creek Valley, west of downtown, was an important transportation and industrial region. The houses of Lower Price Hill were built to house the people who worked in this area. At the time, the region was not thought of as a part of Price Hill; however it became identified with Price Hill in the 20th century. Many of the homes date from the 1850s. The West End Bank and Trust building, built in 1914, stands at the intersection of Eighth and State streets.

Since the 1990s, Lower Price Hill has seen an influx of Hispanic residents, particularly from Guatemala. The population of Lower Price Hill was 1,070 at the 2020 census.
