= Ohio State Route 263 =

State Route 263

Route information
- Maintained by ODOT

Location
- Country: United States
- State: Ohio

Highway system
- Ohio State Highway System; Interstate; US; State; Scenic
← SR 262	→ SR 264

In Ohio, State Route 263 may refer to:

- Ohio State Route 263 (pre-1927), now part of SR 170
- Ohio State Route 263 (1927), now parts of SR 120 and Holland Sylvania Road
