= Ohio State Route 450 =

State highway in Clermont County, Ohio, US

State Route 450

Route information
- Maintained by ODOT
- Length: 1.18 mi (1.90 km)
- Existed: November 22, 2004–present

Major junctions
- West end: Milford Parkway in Milford
- I-275 near Milford
- East end: US 50 near Milford

Location
- Country: United States
- State: Ohio
- Counties: Clermont

Highway system
- Ohio State Highway System; Interstate; US; State; Scenic
← SR 446	→ I-470

State Route 450 (SR 450) is a short east–west state highway in southwestern Ohio, specifically near the eastern Cincinnati suburb of Milford. The western terminus of State Route 450 is at the Milford city limits, just west of a partial cloverleaf interchange with Interstate 275, with the road continuing into Milford known as Milford Parkway, which passes by the River's Edge Shopping Center and several distribution-oriented businesses prior to meeting U.S. Route 50 at the intersection marking the western terminus of State Route 131. State Route 450's eastern terminus is at U.S. Route 50, less than 1 mile (1.6 km) east of Interstate 275.

State Route 450's primary function is as a connector route between Interstate 275 and U.S. Route 50, as there is no direct access between the two routes at the point where U.S. Route 50 passes underneath Interstate 275.

== Route description ==
The point where Milford Parkway meets the city limits of Milford just west of Exit 59 off of Interstate 275 marks the beginning of State Route 450. Heading easterly from there into Union Township, the four-lane divided State Route 450 intersects Interstate 275 at a seven-ramp partial cloverleaf interchange with the only bi-directional ramp being the one connecting State Route 450 with northbound Interstate 275. East of the freeway, State Route 450 crosses over the East Fork of the Little Miami River, after which the median widens out prior to the state route's endpoint at two signalized intersections with U.S. Route 50. Eastbound SR 450 ends at the southerly intersection, a four-way intersection with U.S. 50 and Eastman Drive, the entrance to the TechneCenter industrial park.

For its entire length, just over 1 mile (1.6 km), there are no driveways along State Route 450. Besides the connection with Milford Parkway at its western end, the only other access points to State Route 450 are at the Interstate 275 interchange and the U.S. Route 50 intersection.

== History ==
As the Ohio Department of Transportation (ODOT) built Interstate 275 through Clermont County in the late 1970s, a cloverleaf interchange was graded just south of Milford in preparation for a direct connection to a relocated U.S. Route 50. The new route would have bypassed Milford, running 7.5 miles (12.1 km) to Fairfax along the northern banks of the Little Miami River and its East Fork. The route would have required channelizing part of the East Fork, demolishing two holes of the Terrace Park Country Club, and relocating part of the Norfolk and Western railroad. The relocation was ultimately rejected due to environmental concerns, objections by Terrace Park village officials, a lack of funds, and a decreased demand for the interchange following the completion of the Appalachian Highway (State Route 32), which connected to I-275. ODOT completed half of the cloverleaf interchange, but a 1/2-mile-long (0.80 km) stub to the west dead-ended in a field.

In 1988, ODOT once again considered connecting the unfinished interchange, connecting it to Round Bottom Road in Union Township. The connection would have provided access to a 240-acre (97 ha) light industrial park that Tipton and Associates proposed for a large farm property to the west of the interchange, known as the Gatch property. However, the plan was opposed by a coalition of 16 groups, including the Cincinnati Nature Center. A team of anthropologists from the University of Cincinnati team also discovered Native American relics dating to 12,000 BCE on the proposed site.

In the early 1990s, a $1.3 million access road, which corresponds to the present-day SR 450, was built from the I-275 interchange directly into the Park 50 TechneCenter entrance on U.S. 50. It was funded by the industrial park's developer and a grant awarded by the Appalachian Regional Commission in 1986. ODOT gave it an internal designation of U.S. Route 50 Temporary (U.S. 50T) but did not put up signs identifying it as such. However, the western half of the I-275 interchange remained unfinished.

The Gatch property was eventually redeveloped in 1995 as Milford Commerce Park. Despite hopes of becoming the county's third largest industrial property, its occupancy rate fell short of expectations. Hoping to attract retail tenants with a more accessible road configuration, the developer, Cincinnati United Contractors, spent $4 million to build Milford Parkway from U.S. 50/SR 131 in Milford, across the East Fork, and through the property, dead-ending about 300 feet (91 m) from the I-275 interchange. The parkway's route had been shifted to avoid a series of archaeological sites associated with the Ohio Hopewell people. Its connection to SR 131 passed through what had been an unplatted portion of Greenlawn Cemetery. After excavation, Miami Township officials discovered that the land may have contained unmarked graves of Black people from the late 1800s and early 1900s.

CUC also paid half of the $2.5 million cost to pave and connect the unfinished interchange to Milford Parkway, with the remainder funded by Clermont County and Milford. The rebuilt interchange opened on November 17, 1999, shortly after CUC turned the parkway over to the City of Milford. Milford Commerce Park was later renamed River's Edge Shopping Center.

On November 22, 2004, the state-owned access road from I-275 to U.S. 50 was redesignated from U.S. 50T to State Route 450.

== Major intersections ==
The entire route is in Clermont County.

Location	mi	km	Destinations	Notes
Union Township	0.00	0.00	CR 500 (Milford Parkway)	Western terminus at Milford city limits.
Union Township	0.06– 0.62	0.097– 1.00	I-275 to I-71 / SR 32 – Columbus, Kentucky	Seven-ramp parclo interchange.
Miami Township	1.06	1.71	US 50 – Milford, Hillsboro	Eastern terminus at two signalized intersections.
1.000 mi = 1.609 km; 1.000 km = 0.621 mi
