= Hamilton County Fair (Ohio) =

Ohio's longest-running county fair

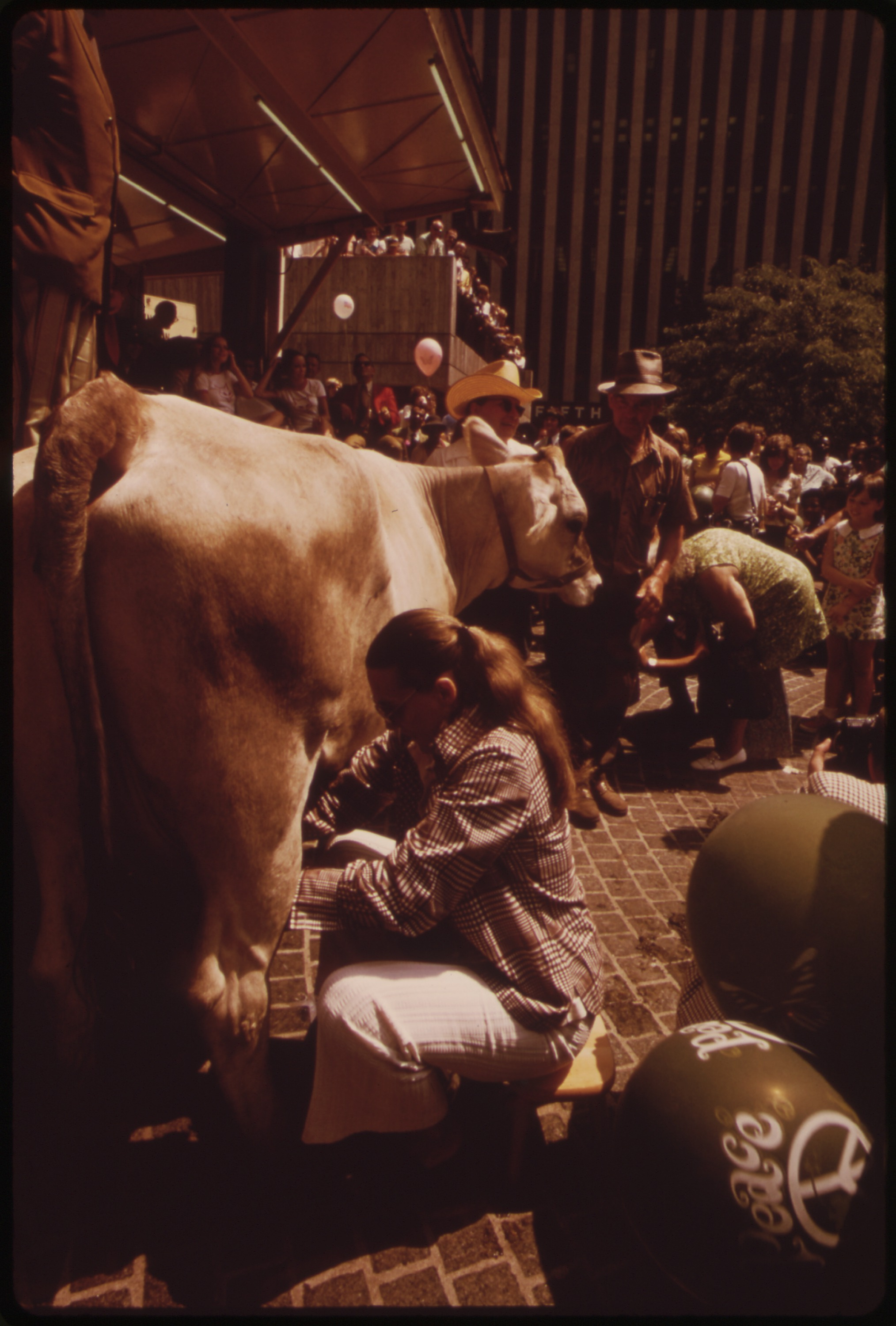
- A celebrity cow milking contest on Fountain Square advertises the 1973 Carthage Fair.
- Status: Active
- Genre: County fair
- Begins: June 27, 2024
- Ends: June 30, 2024
- Frequency: Annually
- Venue: Hamilton County Fairgrounds
- Locations: Carthage, Cincinnati, Ohio
- Coordinates: 39°12′08″N 84°28′24″W
- Country: United States
- Years active: 171
- Inaugurated: 1855
- Founder: William Henry Harrison
- Organizer: Hamilton County Agricultural Society
- Website: hamiltoncountyfair.com

The Hamilton County Fair, formerly known as the Carthage Fair, is the county fair of Hamilton County, Ohio. It was held annually by the Hamilton County Agricultural Society at the Hamilton County Fairgrounds in Cincinnati's Carthage neighborhood. It is the oldest county fair in Ohio, first held in 1820 on the Ezekiel Hutchinson farm and beginning in 1855 at the Fairgrounds location. It was the first fair west of the Allegheny Mountains to offer cash awards in livestock competitions. The fair was canceled in 1861 and 1862 due to the American Civil War, in 1917-18 and 1942-44 due to World Wars; in 2018 due to rain and flash flooding, 2020 due to the COVID-19 pandemic, besides 2021-22 until Fall 2023 for multiple reasons, " ... limited availability of vendors, volunteers, and public sanitation and safety equipment, coupled with vendors’ ongoing concerns for public health ...", but was then cancelled due to Hurricane Ian.
In the 1970s, the racetrack had to be relocated to make room for Ronald Reagan Cross County Highway's West Side extension. The 2023 fair was held at a new location on McDonald Farm in Sale Creek.

Cincinnati Police and Hamilton County, OH Sheriff's Office, besides security guards, are the fair's patrollers.
