= U.S. Route 50 in Ohio =

Segment of American highway

U.S. Route 50
- US 50 highlighted in red

Route information
- Maintained by ODOT
- Length: 209 mi (336 km)

Major junctions
- West end: US 50 at the Indiana state line in Elizabethtown
- I-75 in Cincinnati; I-71 in Cincinnati; I-471 in Cincinnati; I-275 near Milford; US 68 in Fayetteville; US 62 in Hillsboro; US 23 / US 35 in Chillicothe; US 33 in Athens
- East end: US 50 at the West Virginia state line in Belpre

Location
- Country: United States
- State: Ohio
- Counties: Hamilton, Clermont, Brown, Highland, Ross, Vinton, Athens, Washington

Highway system
- United States Numbered Highway System; List; Special; Divided; Ohio State Highway System; Interstate; US; State; Scenic
← SR 49	→ SR 50

U.S. Route 50 (US 50) runs east–west across the southern part of the state of Ohio, passing through Cincinnati, Chillicothe, and Athens. It is mainly a two-lane road except for the easternmost and westernmost parts. Near Athens it runs concurrently with State Route 32 (SR 32), a four-lane divided highway known as Corridor D, and from Coolville to the Ohio–West Virginia border it also overlaps SR 7 before crossing into Parkersburg, West Virginia.

== Route description ==
US 50 enters Ohio from Indiana at a traffic light with State Line Road. The route heads northeast as a four-lane undivided highway, passing through farmland and paralleling the tracks of the former Baltimore and Ohio and Big Four Railroad tracks. The highway passes under Interstate 275 before entering the extreme western suburbs of the greater Cincinnati area. The road has an at-grade crossing with former Big Four branch line railroad track, before curving southeast. US 50 has a traffic signal at the intersection with SR 128. Southeast of SR 128, US 50 becomes a four-lane divided highway and crosses over the Great Miami River. After the river the route enters Cleves and curves due south and passes through residential properties. In Cleves the highway has a traffic signal with SR 264, before leaving Cleves and entering North Bend. In North Bend the road continues to pass through woodland and residential properties, before passing the monument and tomb of President William Henry Harrison. The highway curves east-southeast and becomes a four-lane undivided highway, before leaving North Bend. The road parallels the Ohio River and passes through a mix of woodland, residential and industrial properties. The route begins to curve northeast and enters Cincinnati.

US 50 begins a concurrency with SR 264, at an intersection in the Lower Price Hill neighborhood of Cincinnati. The two routes heads east and is locally known as the Sixth Street Expressway (from Interstate 75 in Queensgate to the Waldvogel Viaduct, which continues to Lower Price Hill). The expressway heads east as a six-lane divided highway passing through industrial properties. As the highway heads east it crosses over a railroad track and the Mill Creek. East of the Mill Creek, the road passes under a railroad track, before an eastbound exit towards Mehring Way. Followed by a westbound entrance from Harriet Street, before passing under another railroad track. The highway has an interchange with Freeman Avenue, this interchange does not have a westbound exit. The expressway passes over some railroad tracks and Linn Street, followed by an eastbound entrance and westbound exit to and from Linn Street. East of the interchange with Linn Street, is a bridge over Gest Street, with a westbound exit. After Gest Street, is an interchange with SR 264, this interchange serves downtown Cincinnati. The Sixth Street Expressway ends at an interchange with Interstate 75 (I–75) and Second Street. US 50 curves southeast and begins a concurrency with I–71.

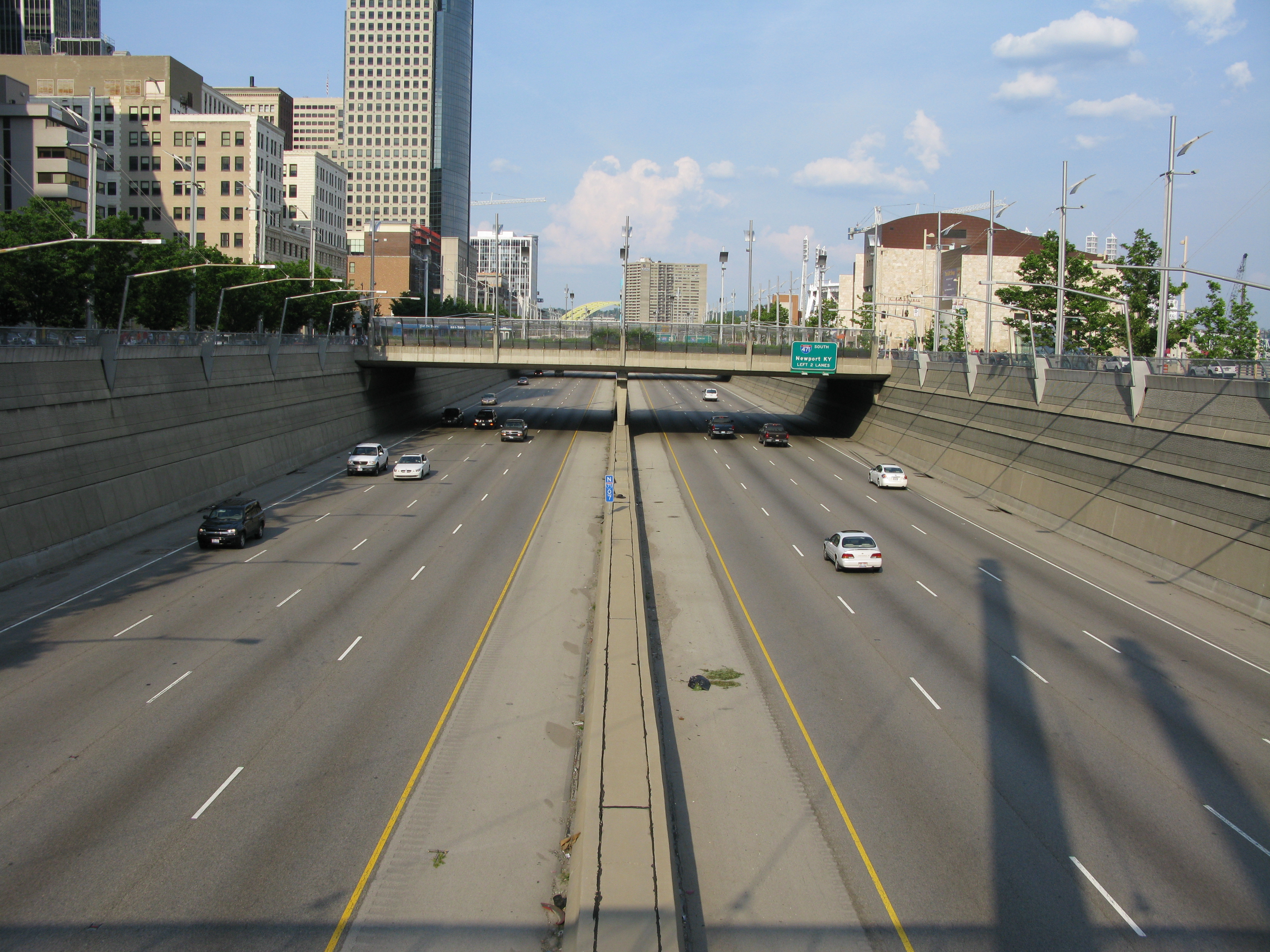
A section of the Fort Washington Way

I–71 and US 50 head east through downtown on an expressway locally known as Fort Washington Way. Fort Washington Way is an eight-lane divided depressed expressway, passing under five city streets. The highway passes Paul Brown Stadium and Great American Ballpark, before I–71 leaves US 50. East of I–71, US 50 is locally known as Columbia Parkway, a four-lane divided highway. The parkway curves northeast having an interchange with I–471, on the east side of downtown. After I–71 the route passes through residential areas, parallel to the Ohio River. The road has an eastbound exit and a westbound entrance interchange with Martin Drive. After Martin Drive the roadway passes through woodland areas as a six-lane undivided highway. The parkway has an eastbound slip ramp with U.S. Route 50 Truck, east of this ramp trucks are not allowed. After the slip ramp the highway curves east, passing over Collins Avenue and having a traffic signal at Torrence Parkway and William Howard Taft Road. East of the traffic signal the route curves southeast having a traffic signal at Delta Avenue. East of Delta Avenue, the roadway becomes a four-lane undivided highway, having a traffic signal at Stanley Avenue. The route becomes a four-lane divided highway, before making a very sharp northeast.

After the sharp curve US 50 heads northeast, having an interchange at SR 32, SR 125, and SR 561, the street is locally known as Beechmont Avenue. Northeast of Beechmont Avenue the parkway crosses over both Linwood Avenue and Heekin Avenue, before an interchange with Eastern Avenue. The Eastern Avenue interchange only allows for westbound exit and eastbound entrance, it is also the eastern terminus of US 50 Truck. From this interchange east truck are allowed. The route enters Fairfax and crosses a few small bridges before an interchange with Red Bank Road. The highway passes through commercial properties having a traffic signal at Wooster Pike. The traffic signal at Wooster Pike is the eastern terminus of the Columbia Parkway.

US 50 heads northeast, locally known as Wooster Pike. The route heads through commercial properties as a two-lane undivided highway, passing through Fairfax and into Mariemont. In Mariemont US 50 becomes a two-lane divided highway passing through residential properties. The roadway becomes a four-lane divided highway in the business area of Mariemont. After leaving the business area of Mariemont the route becomes a four-lane undivided highway, passing through Plainville. The route becomes a two-lane highway with a center turn lane, at an intersection with Newtown Road. The road curves northeast, passing north of the Kroger Hills State Reserve The highway enters Terrace Park, having an intersection with SR 126, this intersection is also the western terminus of SR 28. Just before crossing the river, the route passes under an old railroad bridge that now hosts the Little Miami Scenic Trail. Both US 50 and SR 28 cross over the Little Miami River and enters the City of Milford. The route curves southeast, before turning northeast, passing through the downtown area of Milford. North of downtown the roadway curves east, passing through residential properties, with some commercial properties.

The concurrency turns northeast and has a six-way intersection, where US 50 turns southeast and SR 28 continues northeast. US 50 heads southeast as a four-lane undivided highway, passing through commercial properties. The highway has a traffic signal at SR 131 and Milford Parkway, Milford Parkway gives access to I–275. Southeast of this intersection the roadway narrows to a two-lane divided highway. The highway passes under I–275, with no access. The route curves due south and has an intersection with SR 450 (Milford Parkway), SR 450 has access to I–275.

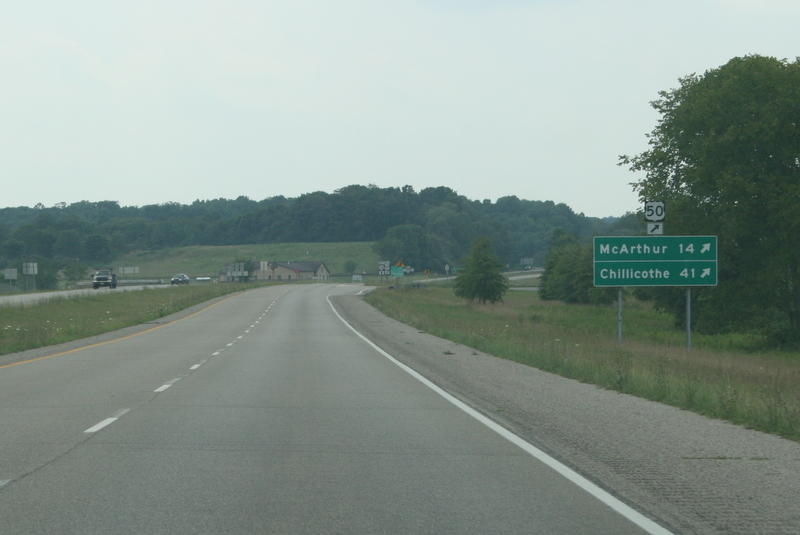
A view of U.S. 50 (traveling west) near Albany, Ohio as it is about to leave the concurrency with SR 32

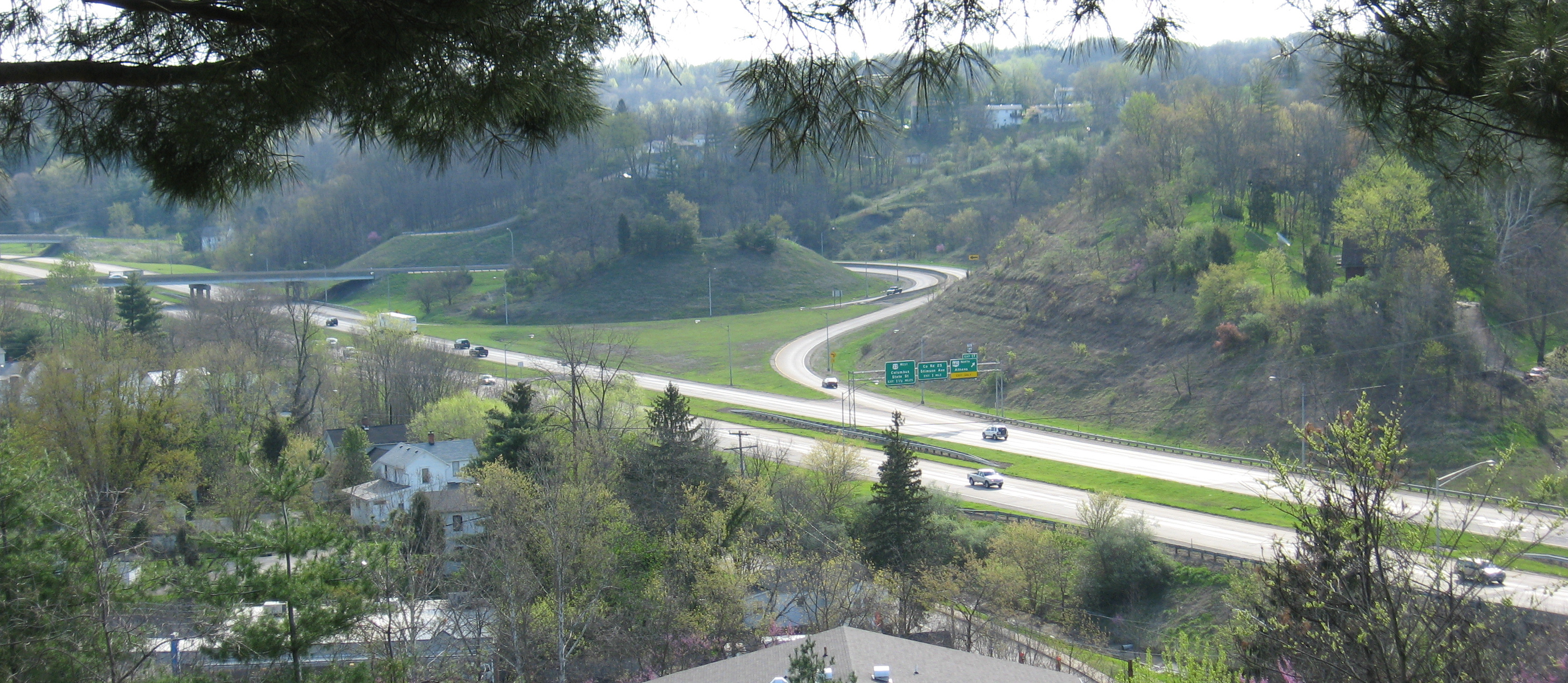
U.S. Route 33 during its brief concurrency with U.S. Route 50 and Ohio State Route 32 in Athens.

East of Milford, US 50 becomes a two-lane highway as it travels through Hillsboro and Bainbridge before reaching the outskirts of Chillicothe. In Chillicothe, US 50 becomes Western Avenue and then Main Street before merging with U.S. Route 23 and U.S. Route 35 east of the city. State Route 104 overlaps US 50 through downtown Chillicothe. As US 50 leaves Chillicothe it becomes a two-lane highway once again as it winds its way through McArthur and heavy forested Southern Ohio before reaching the outskirts of Athens where it becomes a four-lane highway. It remains four-lane until reaching the Ohio River. US 50 joins with State Route 32 near the Ohio University Bush Airport–Snyder Field in Albany, west of Athens. US 50 intersects with U.S. Route 33 east of the city before continuing eastward toward Belpre and the Ohio River. US 50 begins to overlap SR 7 near Reedsville as it heads north along the river, and splits from SR 7 before it crosses the river on the Blennerhassett Island Bridge to Parkersburg, West Virginia.

== History ==
In 1912 the route that would become US 50 was designated Main Market Route 45. In 1923, Main Market Route 45 was decommissioned and SR 7 replaced it from Indiana to Cincinnati. SR 27 from Cincinnati to Milford and SR 26 from Milford to Athens. US 50 replaced SR 144 from Athens to Coolville and SR 7 from Coolville to West Virginia state line. At this time the route that later became US 50 was paved between Indiana and Highland–Ross county line. In 1926 US 50 was signed on a route similar to today. The current route that US 50 between Athens and West Virginia became US 50S in 1929, with the current SR 550 becoming US 50N. US 50S and US 50N would be replaced with US 50 and US 50 Alt, in 1935.

The Columbia Parkway in Cincinnati was completed in 1941 and US 50 was rerouted onto the parkway. The road west of Cincinnati became a four-lane divided highway in 1949. In 1965 the Sixth Street Expressway open and US 50 was rerouted onto the expressway. Also in that year the section of US 50 that is concurrency with SR 7 became a four-lane divided highway. US 50 was routed onto the eastern section of the Athens bypass when it open, in 1977. The western section was opened in 1979 and US 50 was route onto that year. US 50 between Athens and Coolville became a four-lane divided highway between 1997 and 1999. Between 2003 and 2007 a new bridge across the Ohio River was built.

The section of the Columbia Parkway between William Howard Taft Road/Torrence Parkway and Delta Avenue has numerous abandoned staircases built into the Art Deco retaining walls (which were constructed in 1938 as part of the Works Progress Administration). The City of Cincinnati began the process of sealing up these staircases in 2008. Prior to October 18, 2008, turning left from eastbound Columbia Parkway was restricted to turning onto northbound Torrence Parkway, and turning left from eastbound Columbia Parkway onto William Howard Taft Road was prohibited. In addition, turning left from southbound Torrence Parkway onto eastbound Columbia Parkway was also prohibited until then. Ever since the change, however, traffic on westbound Columbia Parkway turning right onto northbound William Howard Taft Road is now required to use the second right turn lane, as the curb lane is now restricted to northbound Torrence Parkway. Prior to then, the curb lane would be used for both aforementioned right turns.

The section of Wooster Pike between Newtown Road and Milford has a left turn center lane with one traffic lane per direction on either side, except for main intersections. Prior to 2009, it was two traffic lanes per direction, with a set of double yellow lines between them. Prior to August 2007, westbound traffic on Wooster Pike at the intersection between Wooster Pike and Newtown Road did not need to stop, due to a thin concrete barrier and green traffic light arrows pointing up, unless the driver was turning left onto Newtown Road.

== Major intersections ==
County	Location	mi	km	Exit	Destinations	Notes
Hamilton	Whitewater Township	0.00	0.00		US 50 west to I-275 – Lawrenceburg	Indiana state line
Hamilton	Whitewater Township	3.73	6.00		SR 128 north to I-74 / I-275 / US 52 – Miamitown, Hamilton	Southern terminus of SR 128
Hamilton	Cleves	4.49	7.23		SR 264 east	Western terminus of SR 264
Hamilton	Cincinnati	18.61	29.95		SR 264 west (State Avenue)	Western end of SR 264 concurrency
Hamilton	Cincinnati	18.66	30.03		Elberon Avenue / Warsaw Avenue	Westbound exit and eastbound entrance; interchange
Hamilton	Cincinnati	18.89	30.40		Western end of freeway	
Hamilton	Cincinnati	19.54	31.45		Mehring Way	Eastbound exit and westbound entrance
Hamilton	Cincinnati	19.76	31.80		To I-75 north / Freeman Avenue	No westbound exit
Hamilton	Cincinnati	19.93	32.07		Linn Street / Dalton Avenue	Westbound exit and eastbound entrance
Hamilton	Cincinnati	20.13	32.40		Gest Street	Westbound exit only
Hamilton	Cincinnati	20.22	32.54		SR 264 east (Fifth Street) – Downtown	Eastern end of SR 264 concurrency; eastbound exit and westbound entrance
Hamilton	Cincinnati	20.55	33.07		I-75 north – Dayton	Westbound exit and eastbound entrance; US 50 west follows exit 1D
Hamilton	Cincinnati	20.76	33.41		I-71 south / I-75 south – Louisville, Lexington	Western end of I–71 concurrency
Hamilton	Cincinnati	20.91	33.65		Second Street	Eastbound exit only. Permanently closed on June 28, 2026.
Hamilton	Cincinnati	21.27	34.23		Third Street – Downtown, Riverfront	Westbound exit and eastbound entrance
Hamilton	Cincinnati	21.37	34.39		I-71 north – Columbus	Eastern end of I-71 concurrency; eastbound exit and westbound entrance
Hamilton	Cincinnati	22.03	35.45		To I-71 north / Eggleston Avenue	Westbound exit and eastbound entrance
Hamilton	Cincinnati	22.17	35.68		Columbia Parkway west to I-471 south – Newport, KY	Westbound exit and eastbound entrance
Hamilton	Cincinnati	22.25	35.81		Martin Drive	Eastbound exit and westbound entrance
Hamilton	Cincinnati	22.35	35.97		Eastern end of freeway	
Hamilton	Cincinnati	22.53	36.26		US 50 Truck east (Bains Street) to US 52	Eastbound exit only; all trucks must exit
Hamilton	Cincinnati	27.75	44.66		SR 32 / SR 125 (Beechmont Avenue) / SR 561	Eastbound exit and westbound entrance; western terminus of SR 32 and SR 125; southern terminus of SR 561; interchange
Hamilton	Cincinnati	28.25	45.46		US 50 Truck west (Eastern Avenue) to SR 32 / SR 125 (Beechmont Avenue) / SR 561 (Linwood Avenue)	Westbound exit and eastbound entrance; interchange
Hamilton	Fairfax	29.28	47.12		Red Bank Road	Interchange
Hamilton	Milford	36.04	58.00		SR 126 west	Western end of SR 28 concurrency
Clermont	Milford	36.91	59.40		SR 28 east (Main Street)	Eastern end of SR 28 concurrency
Clermont	Milford	37.67	60.62		SR 131 east to Milford Parkway / I-275	Western terminus of SR 131
Clermont	Miami Township	39.19	63.07		SR 450 to I-275	Eastern terminus of SR 450
Clermont	Stonelick Township	43.62	70.20		SR 222 south – Batavia	Northern terminus of SR 222
Clermont	Owensville	46.83	75.37		SR 132 north – Goshen	Western end of SR 132 concurrency
Clermont	Owensville	47.19	75.94		SR 132 south / SR 276 south – Batavia, Williamsburg	Eastern end of SR 132 concurrency; northern terminus of SR 276
Clermont	Jackson Township	50.88	81.88		SR 133 – Blanchester, Williamsburg, Stonelick State Park	
Clermont	Marathon	54.26	87.32		SR 286 east – Five Mile	Western terminus of SR 286
Brown	Vera Cruz	57.35	92.30		SR 131	
Brown	Fayetteville	59.30	95.43		US 68	
Brown	Perry Township	61.22	98.52		SR 251 north – Chatfield College, St. Martin	Southern terminus of SR 251
Highland	Dodsonville	65.69	105.72		SR 134 south	Western end of SR 134 concurrency
Highland	Dodsonville	65.76	105.83		SR 134 north – Lynchburg	Eastern end of SR 134 concurrency
Highland	Allensburg	67.77	109.07		SR 135 north – Lynchburg	Southern terminus of SR 135
Highland	Hillsboro	76.27	122.74		SR 124 west	Western end of SR 124 concurrency
Highland	Hillsboro	76.63	123.32		SR 73 north (West Street)	Western end of SR 73 concurrency
Highland	Hillsboro	76.76	123.53		US 62 / SR 73 south / SR 138 (High Street)	Eastern end of SR 73 concurrency
Highland	Hillsboro	77.19	124.23		SR 124 east – Highland County Airport, Rocky Fork State Park	Eastern end of SR 124 concurrency
Highland	Paint Township	86.30	138.89		SR 753 south – Fort Hill, Rocky Fork	Western end of SR 753 concurrency
Highland	Rainsboro	87.23	140.38		SR 753 north	Eastern end of SR 753 concurrency
Ross	Paxton Township	94.86	152.66		SR 41 south	Western end of SR 41 concurrency
Ross	Bainbridge	95.76	154.11		SR 41 north – Greenfield	Eastern end of SR 41 concurrency
Ross	Twin Township	110.18	177.32		SR 28 west – Greenfield	Eastern terminus of SR 28
Ross	Chillicothe	114.85	184.83		SR 104 north (High Street)	Western end of SR 104 concurrency
Ross	Chillicothe	115.19	185.38		SR 772 south (Paint Street)	Northern terminus of SR 772
Ross	Chillicothe	115.61	186.06		US 23 Bus. north / SR 159 north (Bridge Street)	Western end of US 23 Bus, concurrency; southern terminus of SR 159
Ross	Chillicothe	116.13	186.89		US 23 Bus. south / SR 104 south (Bridge Street)	Eastern end of US 23 Bus. concurrency; eastern end of SR 104 concurrency
Ross	Scioto Township	118.16	190.16		US 23 north to US 35 west – Columbus, Dayton, Portsmouth	Interchange
Ross	Scioto Township	118.62	190.90		US 35 west to US 23 north – Columbus, Dayton	Western end of US 35 concurrency; interchange; eastbound entrance and westbound exit
Ross	Liberty Township	120.14	193.35		US 35 east / Schrader Road – Jackson	Eastern end of US 35 concurrency; interchange
Ross	Londonderry	127.08	204.52		SR 327 north – Adelphi, Tar Hollow	Western end of SR 327 concurrency
Vinton	Harrison Township	131.11	211.00		SR 327 south – Wellston, Ray	Eastern end of SR 327 concurrency
Vinton	Harrison Township	134.30	216.13		SR 671 west – Tar Hollow	Eastern terminus of SR 671
Vinton	Richland Township	139.84	225.05		SR 683 south – Lake Rupert, Hamden	Northern terminus of SR 683
Vinton	McArthur	146.61	235.95		SR 93 (Market Street)	
Vinton	Elk Township	149.25	240.19		SR 677 north – Zaleski	Southern terminus of SR 677
Vinton	Prattsville	151.98	244.59		SR 278 north – Zaleski, Nelsonville	Southern terminus of SR 278
Vinton	Bolins Mills	157.81	253.97		SR 356 north – Mineral	Southern terminus of SR 356
Athens	Lee Township	160.14	257.72		SR 143 south – Middleport	Northern terminus of SR 143
Athens	Lee Township	161.06	259.20		SR 32 west – Jackson	Western end of SR 32 concurrency
Athens	Albany	163.19	262.63		SR 681 – Albany	Interchange
Athens	Athens	171.16	275.46	170	US 33 east / Richland Avenue – Pomeroy, Ravenswood	Western end of US 33 concurrency; interchange
Athens	Athens	171.49	275.99	Western end of freeway		
Athens	Athens	172.03	276.86	198	SR 682 north to SR 56 / Richland Avenue – Athens	Southern terminus of SR 682
Athens	Athens	172.82	278.13	197B	Stimson Avenue / Rock Riffle Road	Eastbound exit and westbound entrance
Athens	Athens Township	173.02	278.45	173A	Stimson Avenue / Rock Riffle Road	Future westbound left exit and eastbound entrance
Athens	Athens Township	173.53	279.27	173B	US 33 west / State Street – Columbus	Eastern end of US 33 concurrency
Athens	Athens Township	175.10	281.80	Eastern end of freeway		
Athens	Canaan Township	176.13	283.45	176	East State Street	Interchange
Athens	Canaan Township	178.57	287.38		SR 690 north – Amesville	Southern terminus of SR 690
Athens	Rome Township	183.28	294.96		SR 329 north – Guysville, Stewart	Southern terminus of SR 329
Athens	Troy Township	192.68	310.09		SR 7 south – Pomeroy, Gallipolis	Western end of SR 7 concurrency; interchange
Athens	Troy Township	194.16	312.47		SR 144 – Stewart, Hockingport	
Athens	Troy Township	197.16	317.30		SR 124 west / CR 61 – Hockingport	Eastern terminus of SR 124
Washington	Belpre Township	201.00	323.48		SR 555 north – Bartlett	Southern terminus of SR 555
Washington	Belpre Township	201.80	324.77		SR 618 – Belpre	Eastbound exit and westbound entrance; interchange; western terminus of SR 618
Washington	Belpre Township	201.80	324.77		Western end of freeway	
Washington	Belpre Township	203.24	327.08		SR 339 – Beverly	
Washington	Belpre Township	203.80	327.98		SR 7 north / SR 32 east – Belpre, Marietta	Eastern end of SR 7 and SR 32 concurrencies
Ohio River		204.24	328.69		Blennerhassett Island Bridge	
Ohio River		204.24	328.69		US 50 east to I-77 – Parkersburg	Continuation into West Virginia
1.000 mi = 1.609 km; 1.000 km = 0.621 mi: Concurrency terminus; Incomplete access

U.S. Route 50
Previous state: Indiana	Ohio	Next state: West Virginia
