= Ohio State Route 264 =

State highway in Hamilton County, Ohio, US

State Route 264

Route information
- Maintained by ODOT
- Length: 16.58 mi (26.68 km)

Major junctions
- West end: US 50 in Cleves
- I-75 / US 50 in Cincinnati
- East end: US 27 / US 42 / US 52 / US 127 in Cincinnati

Location
- Country: United States
- State: Ohio
- Counties: Hamilton

Highway system
- Ohio State Highway System; Interstate; US; State; Scenic
| ← SR 263 | → SR 265 |

State Route 264 (SR 264) is a state highway located entirely in Hamilton County, Ohio. The route runs 16.58 miles (26.68 km) between US 50 in Cleves to intersections with Central Avenue in Downtown Cincinnati.

== Route description ==
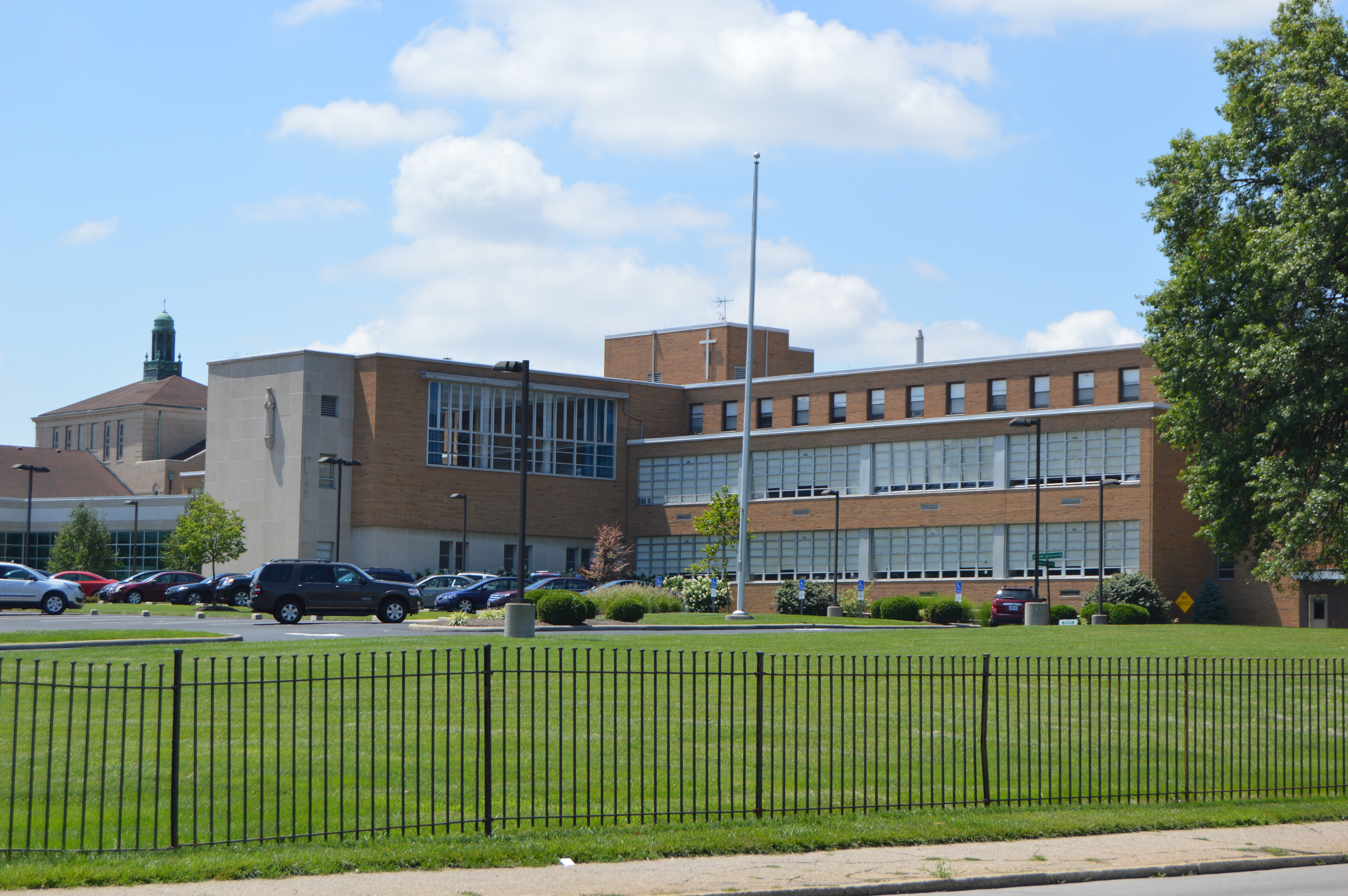
Seton High School, Price Hill

The route runs through southern Hamilton County and serves western Cincinnati suburbs. It acts as an alternate route to US 50 which runs along the Ohio River serving other villages including North Bend and Addyston, as well as the western neighborhoods of Cincinnati (Sayler Park and Riverside).

SR 264 begins at a signalized intersection in downtown Cleves at US 50 (Louisville Pike). It travels east on State Road and heads up a slight incline. Upon leaving the village limits, the road name becomes Bridgetown Road and heads east along ridges through Miami and Green Townships. In the unincorporated community of Bridgetown, the route turns right onto Glenway Avenue. After bypassing the village of Cheviot, the route enters the city limits of Cincinnati, specifically the Westwood neighborhood. After heading southeast and due east through West and East Price Hill, the road begins a steep descent into Lower Price Hill. SR 264 turns right at the bottom of the hill onto State Avenue heading south towards the Ohio River. After passing through a complex interchange with the Waldvogel Viaduct, the road comes to a T-intersection with US 50 (River Road).

SR 264 turns left and becomes concurrent with US 50 onto the Sixth Street Expressway. The multilane elevated expressway runs east through southern Queensgate passing a number of interchanges before cutting away from US 50 at a complex interchange involving I-71, I-75 and US 50. Eastbound SR 264 heads south one block onto Fifth Street in Downtown Cincinnati while westbound travelers must use SR 264-D, an extension of Sixth Street from Downtown to the Expressway. Both SR 264 and SR 264-D have their eastern termini at Central Avenue in Cincinnati adjacent to the Duke Energy Convention Center. Central Avenue in this area carries U.S. Routes 27, 42, 52, and 127. In addition, the two intersections also serve as the western and southern termini of U.S. Route 22 and SR 3 respectively.

== Major intersections ==
The entire route is in Hamilton County.

| Location | mi | km | Destinations | Notes |
|---|---|---|---|---|
| Cleves | 0.00 | 0.00 | US 50 / West State Road – North Bend | |
| Cincinnati | 14.64 | 23.56 | US 50 west (River Road) – Cincinnati | Western end of US 50 concurrency |
| Cincinnati | | | Western end of Sixth Street Expressway | |
| Cincinnati | 15.07 | 24.25 | Elberon Avenue / Warsaw Avenue | Eastbound entrance / westbound exit only |
| Cincinnati | 15.35 | 24.70 | Mehring Way | Eastbound exit / westbound entrance only |
| Cincinnati | 15.80 | 25.43 | Freeman Avenue to I-75 north – Dayton, Cincinnati | No westbound exit |
| Cincinnati | 16.17 | 26.02 | Linn Street / Dalton Avenue | Eastbound entrance / westbound exit only |
| Cincinnati | 16.26 | 26.17 | I-71 / I-75 / US 50 east (Columbia Parkway / Second Street) – Columbus, Dayton, Louisville, Lexington | Exit 1D (I-75), eastern end of US 50 concurrency |
| Cincinnati | | | Eastern end of Sixth Street Expressway | |
| Cincinnati | 16.58 | 26.68 | US 27 / US 42 / US 52 / US 127 (Central Avenue) US 22 east / SR 3 north (Sixth Street) | Western terminus of US 22, southern terminus of SR 3 |
1.000 mi = 1.609 km; 1.000 km = 0.621 mi: Concurrency terminus; Incomplete access
