= Cognis =

Defunct German company

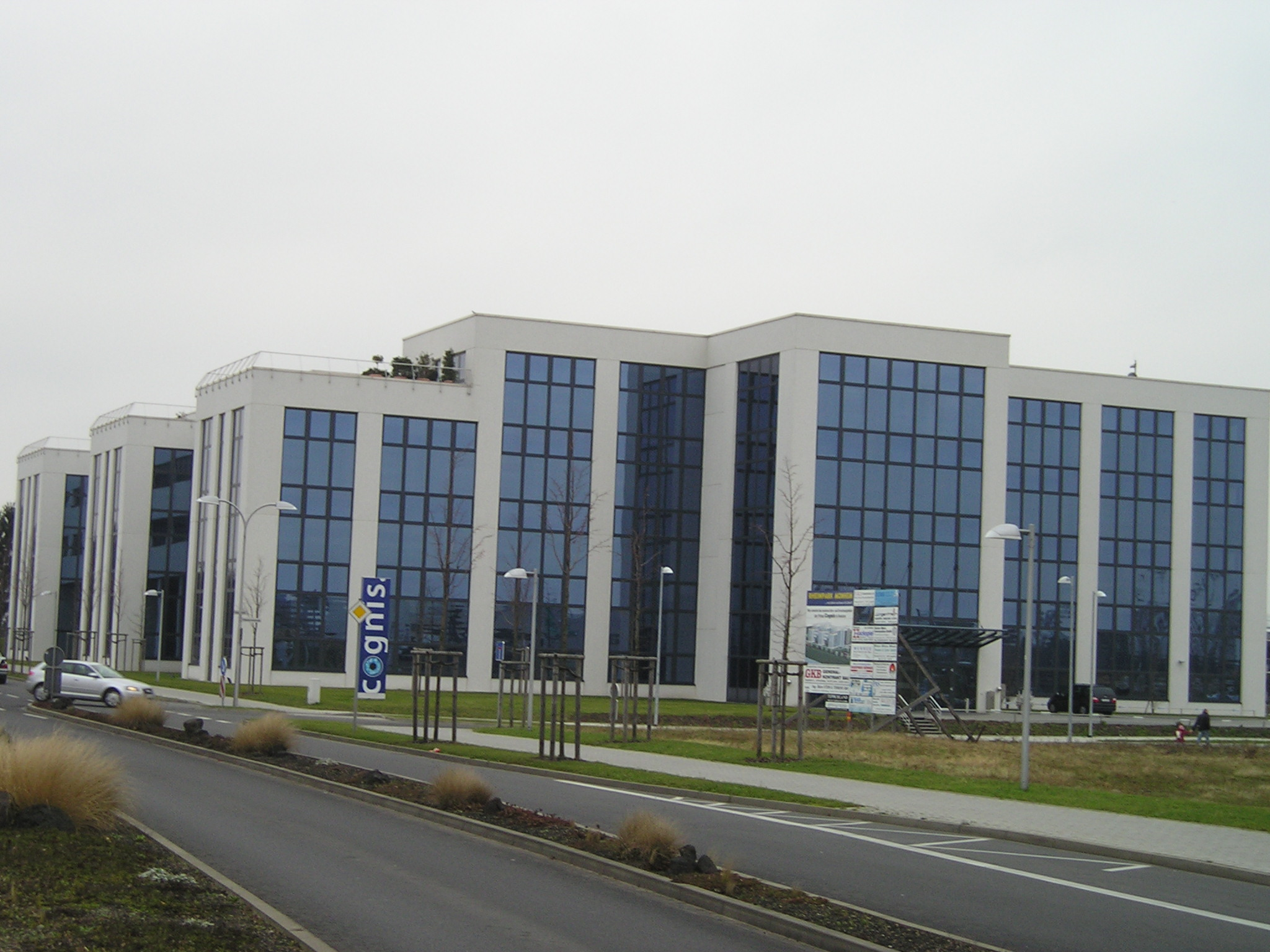
- Head office in Monheim am Rhein
- Company type: Subsidiary
- Industry: Chemicals
- Founded: August 1, 1999; 26 years ago
- Headquarters: Monheim, Germany
- Key people: Antonio Trius (CEO); Helmut Heymann (CAO); Marco Panichi (CFO); Paul S Allen (Functional Products); Richard Ridinger (Care Chemicals); Stéphane Baseden (Nutrition & Health)
- Revenue: € 3.001 billion (2008)
- Number of employees: 5,600 (2009)
- Parent: BASF
- Website: web.archive.org/web/20060222141431/http://www.cognis.com

Cognis was a worldwide supplier of specialty chemicals and nutritional ingredients, headquartered in Monheim am Rhein, North Rhine-Westphalia, Germany. The company employs about 5,600 people and operates production or service centers in almost 30 countries. Cognis was acquired by BASF in 2010.

Cognis was an integrated part of Henkel, a German consumer products company, until 2000, when it became an operationally independent business unit. In November 2001, Cognis was bought by private equity funds Permira, Goldman Sachs Alternatives, and SV Life Sciences.

BASF reached an agreement with Cognis Holding Luxembourg S.à r.l. — which is controlled by Permira Funds, Goldman Sachs Alternatives, and SV Life Sciences — to acquire the specialty chemicals company Cognis for an equity purchase price of €700 million. Including net financial debt and pension obligations, the enterprise value of the transaction is €3.1 billion. The acquisition is subject to clearance by the competent merger control authorities. Closing of the transaction occurred in December 2010.
