= Ohio State Route 561 =

State highway in Hamilton County, Ohio, US

State Route 561

Route information
- Maintained by ODOT
- Length: 7.29 mi (11.73 km)
- Existed: 1938–present

Major junctions
- South end: US 50 in Cincinnati
- I-71 in Norwood; US 22 / SR 3 in Norwood; US 42 in Cincinnati
- North end: Vine Street in Cincinnati

Location
- Country: United States
- State: Ohio
- Counties: Hamilton

Highway system
- Ohio State Highway System; Interstate; US; State; Scenic
← SR 560	→ SR 562

State Route 561 (SR 561) is a north–south state highway in the southwestern portion of the U.S. state of Ohio. Its southern terminus is at U.S. Route 50 approximately 9 miles (14 km) east of Downtown Cincinnati – this point also serves as the western termini for both SR 32 and SR 125; the route’s northern terminus is at its intersection with Vine and Seymour Streets. The route takes many different names along its length, being first known as Linwood Avenue, Observatory Avenue, and Edwards Road in Cincinnati; then it is named Smith Road and Carthage Avenue as it passes through Norwood; its final stretch in Cincinnati once again is as Seymour Avenue.

== Route description ==
No part of SR 561 in Ohio is included as a part of the National Highway System (NHS). The NHS is a network of highways that are identified as being most important for the economy, mobility and defense of the nation.

SR 561 heads north from the southern terminus at an interchange with US 50. The route heads northwest turning north towards Interstate 71. After I–71, the road has a short concurrency with US 22/SR 3 in Norwood. The road heads towards the northern terminus at Vine Street, passing through a traffic light at SR 4 (Paddock Road) just south of exit 9 of I–75.

== History ==
In 1938, the original route was certified. It was originally routed from 2 miles (3.2 km) north of its current southern terminus to U.S. Route 42. SR 561 was then extended to the south to its current terminus on a former segment of U.S. Route 50 in 1941. In 1947, the northern terminus was moved one mile (1.6 km) north of State Route 4. It was moved along a road that was previously not numbered.

== Major intersections ==
The entire route is in Hamilton County.

Location	mi	km	Destinations	Notes
Cincinnati	0.00– 0.13	0.00– 0.21	US 50 west (Columbia Parkway) / SR 32 east / SR 125 east (Beechmont Avenue)	Interchange, no access to eastbound US 50 / from westbound US 50; western termini of SR 32 and SR 125
Norwood	3.08– 3.16	4.96– 5.09	I-71 south – Cincinnati	Exit 6 (I-71), access from I-71 northbound / to I-71 southbound only
Norwood	4.06	6.53	US 22 west / SR 3 south (Montgomery Road) / Sherman Avenue	Southern end of US 22 / SR 3 concurrency
Norwood	4.59	7.39	US 22 east / SR 3 north (Montgomery Road)	Northern end of US 22 / SR 3 concurrency
Cincinnati	6.31	10.15	US 42 (Reading Road)	
Cincinnati	6.98	11.23	SR 4 (Paddock Road) to I-75	
Cincinnati	7.29	11.73	Vine Street / Seymour Street	
1.000 mi = 1.609 km; 1.000 km = 0.621 mi: Concurrency terminus; Incomplete access
