= Ohio State Route 562 =

State highway in Hamilton County, Ohio, US

State Route 562
- Norwood Lateral Expressway

Route information
- Maintained by ODOT, Cincinnati, and Norwood
- Length: 3.43 mi (5.52 km)
- Existed: 1938–present

Major junctions
- West end: I-75 in Cincinnati
- US 42 in Cincinnati; US 22 / SR 561 in Cincinnati
- East end: I-71 in Cincinnati

Location
- Country: United States
- State: Ohio
- Counties: Hamilton

Highway system
- Ohio State Highway System; Interstate; US; State; Scenic
← SR 561	→ SR 563

State Route 562 is an expressway in the Cincinnati metro area of southwestern Ohio. It travels east–west between Interstate 75 and Interstate 71, crossing through the suburban enclave of Norwood. It is generally locally referred to as the Norwood Lateral Expressway. In mid-2025, Gov. Mike DeWine signed a bill into law officially renaming it the “Brigid Kelly Norwood Lateral,” in honor of the late Hamilton County Auditor.

== Route description ==
SR 562, also known as the Norwood Lateral Expressway, begins at an interchange with I-75 in the Bond Hill neighborhood of northern Cincinnati near St. Bernard. The road has an interchange with SR 4 and U.S. Route 42 near Bond Hill. The route then has an interchange with US 22/SR 3 in Norwood. Before the eastern terminus at I-71, the road passes under two different railroad tracks. The eastern terminus of the highway is at a full interchange with I-71.

The entire length of SR 562 in Ohio is included as a part of the National Highway System (NHS).

== History ==
The first section of the Norwood Lateral Expressway was opened to traffic on July 15, 1960, connecting the Mill Creek Expressway (I-75) to Reading Road. Construction of next section, between Reading Road and Montgomery Road, began in April 1970 and was completed on December 12, 1972, at a cost of $6.8 million. The final section, linking to the Northeast Expressway (I-71), opened in late 1973.

== Major intersections ==
The entire route is in Hamilton County.

Location	mi	km	Exit	Destinations	Notes
Cincinnati	0.00	0.00		I-75 – Dayton, Cincinnati	Western terminus of SR 562
Cincinnati	0.65	1.05	1	SR 4 (Paddock Road)	
Norwood	1.21	1.95	2	US 42 (Reading Road)	
Norwood	2.11	3.40	3	US 22 / SR 561 – Norwood	
Cincinnati	3.43	5.52		I-71 – Columbus, Cincinnati	Eastern terminus of SR 562
1.000 mi = 1.609 km; 1.000 km = 0.621 mi
