= Western Hills, Cincinnati =

Area in Cincinnati, Ohio, United States

Coordinates: 39°06′30″N 84°36′30″W

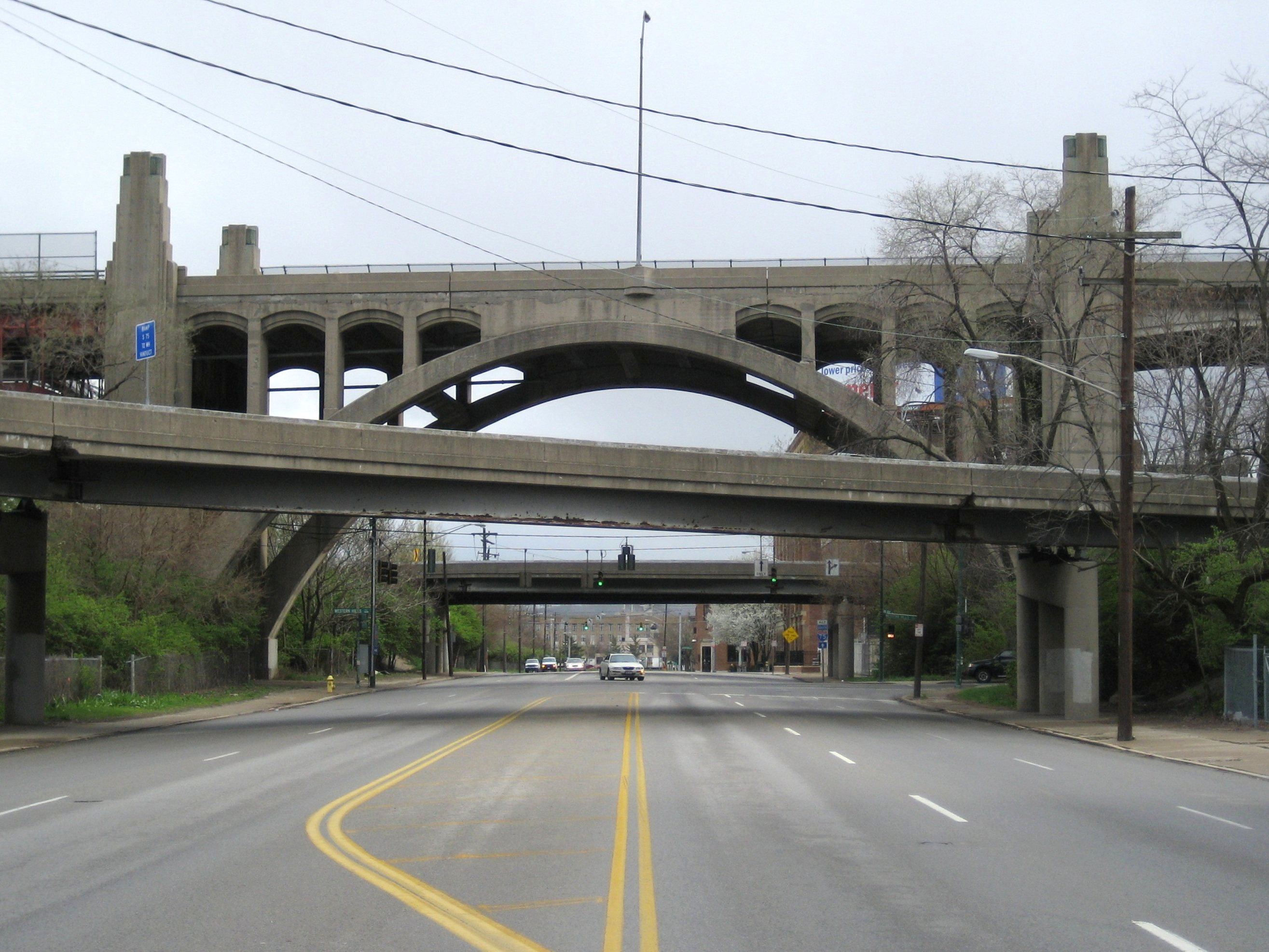
Western Hills Viaduct

Western Hills is an area in Cincinnati, Ohio. Western Hills has been described as "more idea than geography" as it is not a properly defined neighborhood or location. It contains Western Hills High School and various shopping centers and businesses with Western Hills in their names. Areas south of Westwood, Ohio, such as Covedale, Price Hill, and some parts of Green Township are sometimes referred to as Western Hills.

The Western Hills Viaduct is a bridge spanning Interstate 75, exit 2 northbound and exit 2B southbound, providing access to western Cincinnati neighborhoods.The Western Hills Viaduct is 3,500ft. in length, making it is twice as long as any of the Ohio River bridges. The viaduct was built from 1930-32 as part of the Union Terminal project, replacing the much smaller Harrison Ave. Viaduct (1908).
