= Waldvogel Viaduct =

Bridge in Cincinnati, Ohio, United States

Coordinates: 39°06′04″N 84°33′10″W

The Waldvogel Viaduct, also called the Waldvogel Memorial Viaduct, was a bridge on the west side of Cincinnati, Ohio, United States, connecting the Sixth Street Expressway with River Road (U.S. Route 50), Elberon Avenue and Warsaw Avenue. The section of Cincinnati is known as Lower Price Hill.

This viaduct was built to manage automobile traffic and avoid intersecting railroad lines, in order that grade crossings would not be required when the Cincinnati Union Terminal was constructed in 1933. The viaduct was named the Waldvogel Memorial Viaduct after the death of Edward N. Waldvogel (1894–1954), a member of the Ohio senate and mayor of Cincinnati who died in office.

The deteriorating viaduct was replaced in late 2012.

== See also ==
- Roads of Cincinnati, Ohio
