= Cincinnati Fire Department =

Fire department of Cincinnati, Ohio, U.S.

Operational area
- Country: United States
- State: Ohio
- City: Cincinnati

Agency overview
- Established: April 1, 1853; (173 years ago)
- Annual calls: 48,882 (2012)
- Employees: 624 (2015)
- Annual budget: $95,680,440 (2015)
- Staffing: Career
- Fire chief: Frank McKinley
- EMS level: ALS
- IAFF: 48
- Motto: "First in the Nation"

Facilities and equipment
- Divisions: 4
- Stations: 26
- Engines: 26
- Trucks: 12
- Rescues: 2
- Ambulances: 14
- Tenders: 1
- HAZMAT: 1
- Airport crash: 1
- Fireboats: 2
- Rescue boats: 5

Website
- Official website
- IAFF website

The Cincinnati Fire Department provides fire protection and emergency medical services for Cincinnati, Ohio. The department, which was established on April 1, 1853, was the first fully paid and professional fire department in the United States. Along with being responsible for nearly 80 square miles (210 km^{2}) of land, the department also provides response coverage to 25 miles (40 km) of Ohio River shoreline.

== History ==
The Cincinnati Fire Department became the first professional, paid fire department in the United States on April 1, 1853. Miles Greenwood, who co-invented the first steam fire engine, became the department's first chief after a fire in 1852 at Greenwood's Eagle Ironworks, destroyed much of his business. The fire inspired Greenwood to find new and better ways to fight fires.

== Stations and apparatus ==
Cincinnati Fire Department stations and apparatus
Fire Station Number	Neighborhood	Engine Company	Ladder Company	Medic Unit	Special Unit	Chief Unit	District
2	Carthage	Engine 2	Ladder 2	Medic 2			4
3	Downtown	Engine 3	Ladder 3	Medic 3	Boat 3	District Chief 1	1
5	Over-the-Rhine	Engine 5					1
7	Mount Washington	Engine 7					4
8	Pleasant Ridge	Engine 8					4
9	Bond Hill	Engine 9		Medic 9	Heavy Rescue 9, Zodiac Boat 9, Trench Rescue 9		3
12	Camp Washington	Engine 12		Medic 12			2
14	Downtown	Engine 14			Heavy Rescue 14, Hazmat 14, Engine 14B, Zodiac Boat 14	Safety Officer 2	1
17	Price Hill	Engine 17	Ladder 17	Medic 17	Zodiac Boat 17	District Chief 2	2
18	Lunken Airport	Engine 18	Ladder 18		ARFF 18, ARFF 218, Water Tanker 18, Mass Casualty ATVs, Gator 18, Boat 18		4
19	Corryville	Engine 19	Ladder 19	Medic 19			1
20	Northside	Engine 20	Ladder 20			District Chief 3	3
21	South Fairmount	Engine 21			Ventilation Truck		2
23	Walnut Hills	Engine 23	Ladder 23	Medic 23	Zodiac Boat 23		1
24	Price Hill	Engine 24	Ladder 24	Medic 24			2
29	West End	Engine 29	Ladder 29	Medic 29			2
31	Oakley	Engine 31	Ladder 31			District Chief 4	4
32	Avondale	Engine 32	Ladder 32	Medic 32	Mass Casualty 32	ALS 32	3
34	Clifton	Engine 34				ALS 34	1
35	Westwood	Engine 35	Ladder 35	Medic 35	Mass Casualty 35	ALS 35	3
37	Riverside	Engine 37			Foam 37 Boat 37		2
38	Spring Grove Village	Engine 38	Fuel Truck				3
46	Hyde Park	Engine 46		Medic 46			4
49	Madisonville	Engine 49					4
50	Sayler Park	Engine 50					2
51	College Hill	Engine 51		Medic 51			3
