= Ethan Stone =

American politician (1767–1852)

Ethan Stone (1767–1852) was an American lawyer, banker, politician, and philanthropist from Cincinnati, Ohio. A major property investor, he became influential in state politics, but his fortunes waxed and waned with the local property market. His considerable wealth at the time of his death produced the first elections open to local women as part of the longest trust case in state history.

== Career ==
Stone originally lived in Massachusetts. In 1802, he arrived in Cincinnati by covered wagon and established a legal practice. He made extensive property investments, eventually becoming a millionaire. He served as a trustee on the Cincinnati Select Council in 1805 and as clerk of council in 1810. From 1805 to 1806, he represented Hamilton County in the Ohio House of Representatives as a member of the Federalist Party. He also served as a justice of the peace.

In 1810, Stone used his political clout to convince the Ohio General Assembly to lease to him Section 29 of Cincinnati Township, which he would then sublet. In 1814, the Bank of Cincinnati was organized with Stone as president. From 1818 to 1820, he and the bank suffered heavy losses as the property market crashed. The lease was amended in 1821, allowing him to rent the section for $40 annually for 99 years, renewable in perpetuity. It would prove lucrative to Stone.

Stone twice ran unsuccessfully to represent Ohio's 1st congressional district in the United States House of Representatives in 1812 and 1818. By the early 1820s, he had retired from banking due to failing eyesight.

== Mill Creek bridge ==
In 1816 or 1817, the Hamilton County Board of County Commissioners commissioned Stone to build a bridge across Mill Creek. However, a flood in the spring of 1822 washed away the bridge before the commissioners would accept it. He bore the entire loss of more than $100,000, which nearly ruined him. He spent the next 20 years making his contract good, erecting a more elaborate stone and wood structure, which the commissioners purchased and made a free bridge. A flood in 1832 carried the wooden portion down to an island above Louisville, Kentucky, where it was dismantled and shipped back to Cincinnati by flatboat. Years later, the bridge was again destroyed by fire.

== Religion and philanthropy ==
Stone belonged to the Episcopal Church. In 1817, he co-founded Christ Church along with other prominent city leaders. He served as the first warden along with Elijah Bemis and as the first delegate to the Episcopal Diocese of Ohio.

Around 1823, Stone helped Dr. John Locke establish the Cincinnati Female Academy, a nonsectarian school for the city's elite. He was a major donor to the College of Cincinnati at its inception.

== Personal life ==
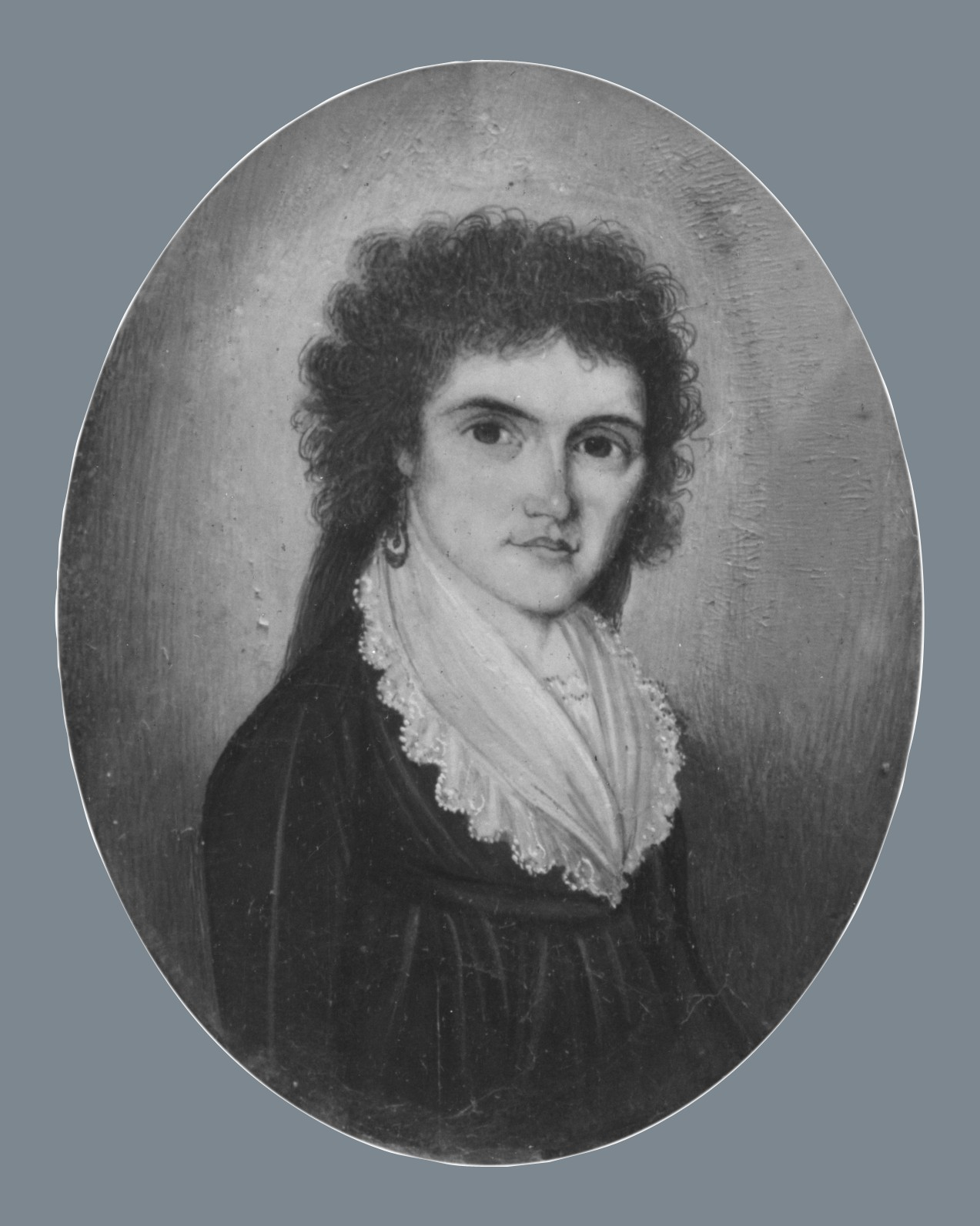
Mrs. Ethan Stone (Abigail Maria Storrs)

Stone married Abigail Maria Storrs in 1795. Though she was known as Mrs. Ethan Stone, he named Storrs Township after her maiden name.

His nephew, Dan Stone, served in the Illinois General Assembly and as an Illinois circuit court judge.

== Death and legacy ==
Stone derived considerable profit from subletting ministerial land in Storrs Township, which was subject to a provision that proceeds from the sale or sublease of land were to be used for the funding of Christian churches and schools in the township. At his death in 1852, the proceeds were valued at over $32,000 annually. His will, drafted by Alphonso Taft, directed the money to the Cincinnati Orphan Asylum, an elderly care facility, Storrs Township churches, and Cincinnati College. After the college declined to use the funds for training Episcopal priests, the funds were instead directed to the Episcopal Diocese of Ohio, later the Episcopal Diocese of Southern Ohio.

After Cincinnati largely annexed Storrs Township in 1869, the city failed to carry out the trust until 1881, when the Hamilton County Probate Court stepped in. In 1893, the Probate Court ordered that trust funds be disbursed to a church chosen in an election every ten years. The elections were open to Protestants at least 15 years of age. These were the only elections open to local women until the Nineteenth Amendment took effect in 1920. The last election, in 1993, awarded the funds to Price Hill United Methodist Church.

By 2003, the land no longer generated a profit and too little money remained in the trust for further elections. In 2012, Stone's trustee asked the Probate Court to award full title to the lessees. By the time the case was closed on March 22, 2019, 167 years after Stone's death, it was the longest open trust case in Ohio and presumably the oldest active court case in the United States.
