= Price Hill, Cincinnati =

Price Hill
- Neighborhoods of Cincinnati
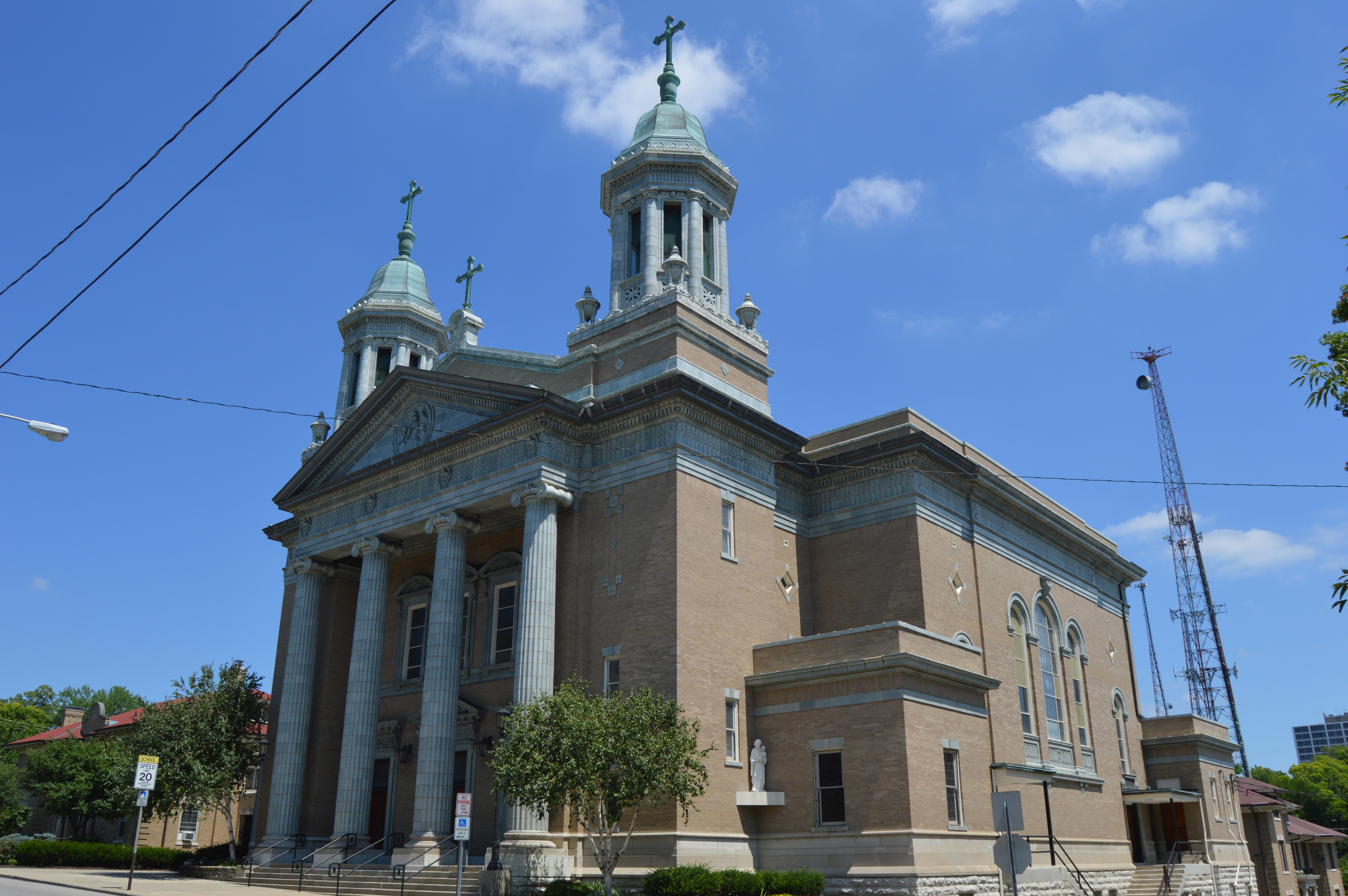
- Holy Family Catholic Church in Price Hill

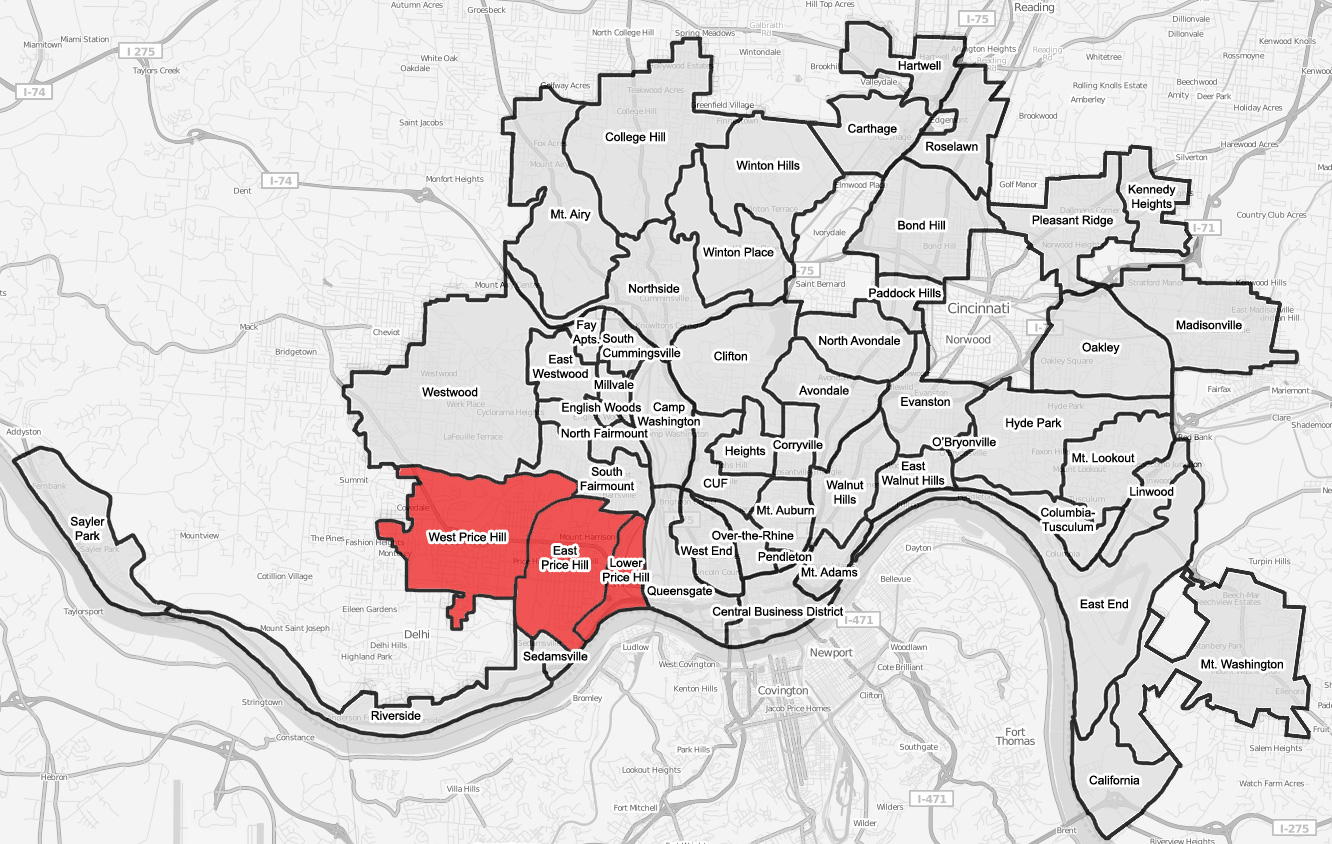
- Price Hill (red) within Cincinnati, OH
- Country: United States
- State: Ohio
- County: Hamilton
- City: Cincinnati

Population (2020)
  - Total: 36,271
- ZIP: 45205, 45238, 45204

Price Hill is a region of Cincinnati, Ohio consisting of three neighborhoods: East Price Hill, West Price Hill, and Lower Price Hill. The region is located in the western part of the city, neighbored by Sedamsville and Riverside to the south, Westwood and South Fairmount to the north, and Queensgate to the west. Originally one of the oldest suburbs of Cincinnati, the region is predominately Catholic, having been an ethnic enclave for both Irish and German Catholics. Price Hill's neighborhoods are residential communities, having a combined population of 36,271 at the 2020 census.

== History ==
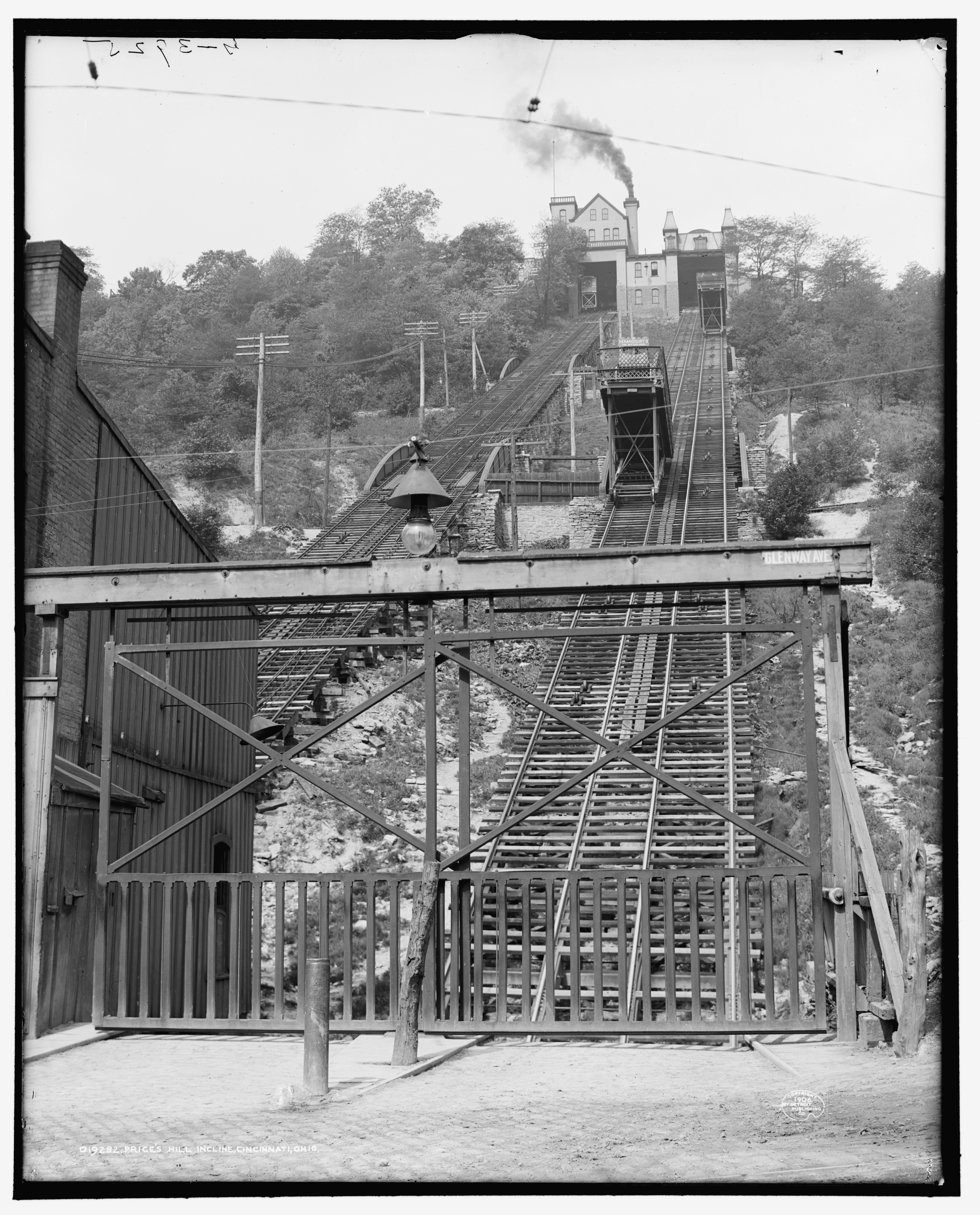
The incline at Price's Hill, c. 1906

Before the Symmes Purchase of the 1780s, the area of Price Hill was sparsely populated Indian territory. The remains of Indian burial mounds and lookout posts were located in the area. Price Hill was originally part of both Delhi and Storrs townships. The eastern portion of the neighborhood, located in Storrs Township, became part of Cincinnati when the city annexed the whole township in 1870. West Price Hill, located in Delhi Township, was annexed three decades later in 1902.

Cincinnati became heavily populated in the 19th century, due to steamboat traffic and hog packing, and some of the city's wealthier residents settled in the nearly inaccessible hill country to the west. This region was high enough and far enough away to escape the pollution and crowdedness of the inner city. One such resident was General Rees E. Price, who purchased and developed large parts of the hill. The area was then called "Price's Hill", later shortened to "Price Hill".

A funicular called locally "the Incline" or "the Incline Plane" was built to help make the region more accessible. With its base on the corner of 8th Street and Glenway Avenue, the Incline climbed 350 feet over the top of the hill. Thanks to the Incline, by the 1870s there were thousands of residents. Most of the residents were Irish or German Catholics. The Eighth Street Viaduct was built by the end of the century, and the more accessible region became a thriving upper-middle-class suburb, with a commercial center along Glenway Avenue. Many of the houses that still stand in the district were built in the early years of the 20th century.

Mount St. Mary's Seminary of the West was first established on a 10-acre (4.0 ha) site at the northwest corner of Grand and Warsaw Avenues. The site was converted to a Catholic school devoted to the care and training of orphaned, dependent, and underprivileged girls. Holy Family Parish was also located on this site. Seton High School was founded as Mount St. Vincent Academy, Cedar Grove in 1854 by the Sisters of Charity of Cincinnati. Union Baptist Cemetery was founded in 1864, it is the oldest Baptist African-American cemetery in Cincinnati.

When Cincinnati was plagued by tuberculosis in the early 20th century, Price Hill housed the Cincinnati Tubercular Hospital, one of the nation's leading centers for treatment and research. The hospital has since been converted into the Arts Center at Dunham, which boasts an Art Deco theater. A Carnegie library was built in Price Hill in 1909. The Covedale Theater was built in 1947.

== Geography ==
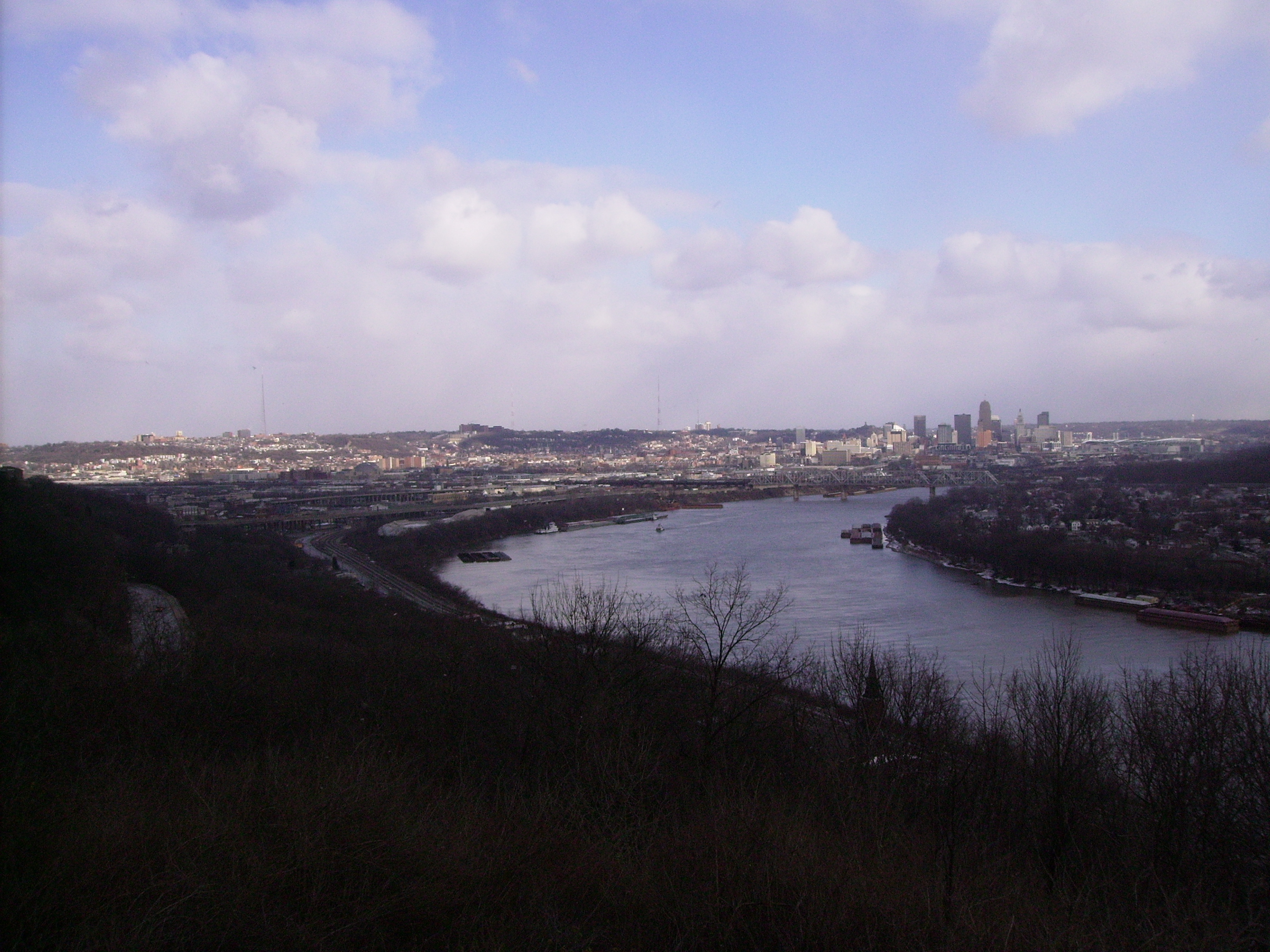
The view of downtown Cincinnati from Mt. Echo Park, in Price Hill

Price Hill covers a little over six square miles. It is subdivided into East Price Hill, West Price Hill, and Lower Price Hill. East Price Hill covers 3 square miles (7.8 km^{2}), West Price Hill covers 2.75 square miles (7.1 km^{2}), and Lower Price Hillcovers 0.57 square miles (1.5 km^{2}). The latter neighborhood located is in the river valley to the southwest of East Price Hill. The city police use the Mill Creek as the border between Lower Price Hill and Queensgate.

== Demographics ==
Population of Greater Price Hill (East, West and Lower) 1900-2020
Year	Pop.	±%
1900	17,182	—
1910	21,825	+27.0%
1920	30,425	+39.4%
1930	42,915	+41.1%
1940	42,870	−0.1%
1950	42,935	+0.2%
1960	49,182	+14.5%
1970	46,861	−4.7%
1980	39,734	−15.2%
1990	40,859	+2.8%
2000	36,388	−10.9%
2010	33,570	−7.7%
2020	36,271	+8.0%

=== East Price Hill ===
As of the census of 2020, there were 15,241 people living in East Price Hill. There were 7,037 housing units. The racial makeup of the neighborhood was 39.4% White, 36.3% Black or African American, 0.9% Native American, 0.7% Asian, 0.0% Pacific Islander, 15.5% from some other race, and 7.2% from two or more races. 19.9% of the population were Hispanic or Latino of any race.

There were 6,063 households, out of which 57.8% were families. 34.9% of all households were made up of individuals.

27.0% of the neighborhood's population were under the age of 18, 57.8% were 18 to 64, and 15.2% were 65 years of age or older. 48.4% of the population were male and 51.6% were female.

According to the U.S. Census American Community Survey, for the period 2016-2020 the estimated median annual income for a household in the neighborhood was $30,112. About 26.8% of family households were living below the poverty line. About 15.1% had a bachelor's degree or higher.

=== West Price Hill ===
As of the census of 2020, there were 19,960 people living in West Price Hill. There were 8,962 housing units. The racial makeup of the neighborhood was 55.7% White, 30.1% Black or African American, 0.5% Native American, 0.7% Asian, 0.0% Pacific Islander, 5.3% from some other race, and 7.7% from two or more races. 8.3% of the population were Hispanic or Latino of any race.

There were 8,108 households, out of which 58.3% were families. 35.5% of all households were made up of individuals.

27.9% of the neighborhood's population were under the age of 18, 63.4% were 18 to 64, and 8.7% were 65 years of age or older. 47.7% of the population were male and 52.3% were female.

According to the U.S. Census American Community Survey, for the period 2016-2020 the estimated median annual income for a household in the neighborhood was $44,664. About 14.5% of family households were living below the poverty line. About 22.0% had a bachelor's degree or higher.

=== Lower Price Hill ===
As of the census of 2020, there were 1,070 people living in Lower Price Hill. There were 434 housing units. The racial makeup of the neighborhood was 40.9% White, 47.8% Black or African American, 0.6% Native American, 0.0% Asian, 0.0% Pacific Islander, 4.9% from some other race, and 5.9% from two or more races. 6.1% of the population were Hispanic or Latino of any race.

There were 369 households, out of which 42.8% were families. 41.7% of all households were made up of individuals.

34.8% of the neighborhood's population were under the age of 18, 57.2% were 18 to 64, and 8.0% were 65 years of age or older. 63.1% of the population were male and 36.9% were female.

According to the U.S. Census American Community Survey, for the period 2016-2020 the estimated median annual income for a household in the neighborhood was $15,987. About 66.5% of family households were living below the poverty line. About 8.7% had a bachelor's degree or higher.

== Culture ==
Price Hill is majority Catholic. There is a community newspaper called "Price Hill Press," which is published by The Cincinnati Enquirer.

Price Hill Chili and the Covedale Center for the Performing Arts are local institutions located in Price Hill.

== Parks ==
Parks in Price Hill include Mt. Echo Park and Rapid Run Park.

== Education ==
- Carson Elementary - A public school serving Kindergarten through 6th grade.
- Rees E. Price Academy - A public school serving Kindergarten through 6th grade.
- Holy Family School - A Catholic school serving Pre-Kindergarten through 8th grade.
- Resurrection School - A Catholic school serving Pre-Kindergarten through 8th grade.
- Roberts Academy - A public school serving Pre-Kindergarten through 8th grade.
- St. Lawrence School - A Catholic school serving Pre-Kindergarten through 8th grade.
- St. Teresa of Avila - A Catholic school serving Pre-Kindergarten through 8th grade.
- St. William - A Catholic school serving Pre-Kindergarten through 8th grade.
- Covedale Elementary - A public school serving Kindergarten through 6th grade.
- Dater Montessori - A public high school, not located in Price Hill but serving children who live in the neighborhood.
- Western Hills University High School - A public high school serving children in Price Hill and other neighborhoods.
- Elder High School - A Catholic boys high school.
- Seton High School - A Catholic girls high school.
- Mother of Mercy High School - A Catholic girls high school, not located in Price Hill but serving girls who live in the neighborhood.
- Oyler School - A public school serving Kindergarten through high school.
- IDEA Public School' - A public charter school currently serving K-2 (Academy), and 6-7th grades (College Prep), and will eventually be K—12.

== Landmarks ==
- Branch Hospital for Contagious Diseases From 1897, this hospital was used for housing and treating victims of tuberculosis. The hospital now forms part of the Dunham Recreation Center.
- Fire Company 24 Constructed in 1889, the fire station is now a private residence with a first-floor art gallery.
- Mount Echo Park Established in 1908, the 73-acre (30 ha) park is known as the viewing platform for one of the best views of Cincinnati's skyline.
- Price Hill Library Finished in 1909, the library was one of the many libraries funded by Andrew Carnegie. It is now a branch of the Cincinnati and Hamilton County Public Library system.
- The Covedale Center for the Performing Arts
