= Administrative divisions of Ohio =

The administrative divisions of Ohio are counties, municipalities (cities and villages), townships, special districts, and school districts.

Elections for county officials are held in even-numbered years, while elections for officials in the municipalities, townships, and local boards of education are held in odd-numbered years.

== Counties ==
Ohio is divided into 88 counties. Ohio law defines a structure for county government, although they may adopt charters for home rule. The minimum population requirement for incorporation is 1,600 for a village and 5,000 for a city.

Unless a county has adopted a charter, it has a structure that includes the following elected officers:

- A three-member board of commissioners exercising both executive and legislative powers.
- County sheriff: The highest law enforcement officer in the county. Many cities and villages, and even some townships, have their own police forces which take over the sheriff's patrolling and response duties in their own areas, but the sheriff remains responsible for the remaining areas of the county. In some counties with large municipalities, the sheriff may have no patrolling and response duties, but the sheriff remains responsible for running the county jail, and acting as an officer of the local courts (serving warrants, transporting prisoners, acting as bailiff, etc.)
- County coroner: Responsible for determining the cause of death in suspicious circumstances. Is the only person in the county with the authority to arrest the sheriff.
- County auditor
- County treasurer
- Clerk of the court of common pleas
- County prosecutor: Responsible for acting on behalf of the state in criminal matters and also acts as the county government's legal counsel. In rural areas, the elected prosecutor may choose to take a reduced salary and act as a "part-time" prosecutor. In such cases, the prosecutor may offer private legal services, but only in non-criminal matters.
- County engineer
- County recorder: Keeps records of changes in title of real property within the county.

Nine of the counties existed at the time of the Ohio Constitutional Convention in 1802. A tenth county, Wayne, was established on August 15, 1796, and encompassed most of Northwest Ohio. During the convention, the county was opposed to statehood, and was not only left out of the convention, but dissolved; the current Wayne County is unrelated to the original.

=== Charter counties ===
The Ohio Constitution allows counties to set up a charter government as many cities and villages do, Currently, the counties of Summit and Cuyahoga have charter status, the latter having been approved by voters in November 2009.

Charter status permits primarily the county to confer on itself all of the powers vested in municipalities by state law and the state constitution. When wishing to exercise exclusive powers of the municipalities upon itself against without the consent of said municipalities, a majority of county electors must approve of such transfer of power. Approval must be won in the county at-large, in the largest municipality of the county, and in the county outside of this municipality. In counties with populations of 500,000 or less, approval must be won in a majority of the combined total of municipalities and townships of the county.

In the 2010 United States Census, the average population of Ohio's counties was 131,096; Cuyahoga County was the most populous (1,280,122) and Vinton County was the least (13,435). The average land area is 464 sq mi (1,200 km^{2}). The largest county is Ashtabula County at 702.44 sq mi (1,819.3 km^{2}) and the smallest is Lake County at 228.21 sq mi (591.1 km^{2}). The total area of the state is 40,860.69 sq mi (105,828.7 km^{2}).

== Municipal corporations ==
Under the 1912 Constitution of Ohio, there are two kinds of incorporated municipalities: cities and villages. The 2008-2009 Roster provided by the Ohio Secretary of State enumerates 251 cities and 681 villages in the state. Municipalities are defined in section 703.01(A) of the Ohio Revised Code:

Municipal corporations, which, at the last federal census, had a population of five thousand or more, or five thousand registered resident electors or resident voters as provided in section 703.011 of the Revised Code, are cities. All other municipal corporations are villages. Cities, which, at any federal census, have a population of less than five thousand, shall become villages. Villages, which, at any federal census, have a population of five thousand or more, shall become cities.

Two exceptions exist:

- A municipality with at least five thousand registered voters is a city
- A municipality with more than five thousand residents is a village if its population falls below five thousand after subtracting out-of-town students and prisoners

When the boundaries of a township are coterminous with the boundaries of a city or village, the township ceases to exist as a separate government.

Since 1992, in order to incorporate as a city, the territory to be incorporated must meet the following conditions per section 707.29 of the Ohio Revised Code:

1. It shall consist of not less than four square miles.
2. It shall have a population of not less than twenty-five thousand and a population density of at least one thousand persons per square mile.
3. It shall have an assessed valuation of real, personal, and public utility property subject, except as otherwise provided in division (A)(3) of this section, to general property taxation of at least twenty-five hundred dollars per capita. In determining per capita assessed valuation under division (A)(3) of this section, the assessed valuation of any tangible personal property, buildings, structures, improvements, and fixtures that are exempt from taxation under division (B) of section 5709.081 [5709.08.1] of the Revised Code shall be added to the assessed valuation of real, personal, and public utility property subject to general property taxation.
4. It shall not completely surround an existing municipal corporation.
5. It shall be contiguous.

Municipalities have full home rule powers, may adopt a charter, ordinances and resolutions for self-government. Each municipality chooses its own form of government, but most have elected mayors and city councils or city commissions. City governments provide much more extensive services than county governments, such as police forces and professional (as opposed to volunteer) fire departments.

Additional municipal services are often financed by local income taxes that townships cannot impose except in a Joint Economic Development District with a municipality. Not all municipalities levy income taxes; those that do range from 0.3% in the Village of Indian Hill to 3.0% in Parma Heights.

Municipality names are not unique: there is a village of Centerville and a city of Centerville; also a city of Oakwood and two similarly named villages: Oakwood, Cuyahoga County, Ohio and Oakwood, Paulding County, Ohio.

The 1802 and 1851 constitutions classified municipalities as towns and cities, as opposed to villages and cities.

== Townships ==
The territory of each county is divided into civil townships. There are more than 1,000 townships in Ohio, ranging from the very small with only a few hundred inhabitants (e.g. Washington in Warren County) to gigantic townships with tens of thousands of residents and bigger than most cities of the state (e.g. Colerain and West Chester). The entire area of the state is encompassed by township governments, except for townships that are coterminous with a city or village.

Townships may have limited home rule powers. Chapter 504 of the Ohio Revised Code outlines the procedures for adopting limited home rule governments: Townships with 2,500 to 5,000 residents in an unincorporated territory may adopt a limited home rule government upon petition of voters, after meeting certain conditions and holding a referendum. Townships with 5,000 to 15,000 residents in their unincorporated area may adopt a limited home rule government upon petition of voters or by a majority vote by the board of township trustees, then holding a referendum. Townships with 15,000 or more population in their unincorporated area may adopt limited home-rule government powers, upon petition of voters or by a majority vote by the board of township trustees, then holding a referendum; such townships may also adopt limited home-rule government powers by unanimous vote of the trustees, subject to a petition by voters to place the question on the ballot for approval or rejection. Limited home-rule townships with 15,000 or more population are called "urban townships".

When the boundaries of a township are coterminous with the boundaries of a city or village, the township ceases to exist as a separate government, creating what is known as a paper township. As a result, there are many townships that do not exist as functioning legal jurisdictions, particularly in southwestern Ohio. For example, the City of Cincinnati is coextensive with Cincinnati Township, which no longer exists as a governmental entity.

Townships have four elected officials: A three-member board of township trustees and a fiscal officer. All are elected to four-year terms in non-partisan elections.

== Special districts ==
As in other states, general law provides for a variety of special districts, including:

- Joint economic development districts
- New community authorities
- Special improvement districts
- Sewer districts
- Transportation improvement districts

== School districts ==
There are more than 600 city, local, and exempted village school districts providing K-12 education in Ohio. There are also about four dozen joint vocational school districts which are separate from the K-12 districts. The borders of the school district do not strictly follow county, township, or municipal borders. A school district can exist in multiple townships, municipalities, or counties. One school district, the College Corner Local School District, is an arrangement in which the State of Ohio reimburses the State of Indiana for the cost of educating Ohio students.

Each city school district, local school district, or exempted village school district is governed by an elected board of education. The board has direct authority over the local schools and appoints the local superintendent of schools. A school district previously under state supervision (municipal school district) may be governed by a board whose members either are elected or appointed by the mayor of the municipality containing the greatest portion of the district's area.

School districts may levy local school taxes and issue bonds with voter approval. Although most tax-financed schools are funded through property taxes, districts may also impose income taxes, which are up to 1.75% of earned income.

In 1914, the Ohio General Assembly created county boards of education to provide support services to local school districts. Subsequently, in 1995 the county boards of education were renamed Educational Service Centers and allowed to merge with neighboring ESCs to form regional agencies. Each ESC is supervised by a locally elected governing board and headed by a superintendent. On average 23.51% of an ESC's funding is provided by the state, 8.75% federal, 3.13% other, and 64.61% is generated through fee-for-service contracts with customer school districts.
