= Rapid Run =

Rapid Run may refer to:

- Rapid Run (Ohio River), a stream in Hamilton County, Ohio
- Rapid Run (Buffalo Creek), a stream in Centre and Union Counties, Pennsylvania
- Rapid Run (Transformers), a character in Transformers:Robots in Disguise
