= Mill Creek Township, Hamilton County, Ohio =

An 1856 map of Hamilton County depicting Millcreek Township at its original size in blue.

Millcreek Township (or Mill Creek Township) is a survey township in south-central Hamilton County, Ohio, that also existed as a civil township from 1810 until 1943. Once the most important township in the county, it was largely absorbed by Cincinnati and its suburbs, nominally remaining as a paper township from 1943 until 1953. It was abolished when the rest of its unincorporated territory, consisting of Wesleyan Cemetery, became part of Cincinnati. As the original survey township covers a large portion of present-day Cincinnati, references to it are frequently encountered by genealogists.

== Name ==
Millcreek Township is named after Mill Creek, which runs through it. Statewide, other Millcreek Townships are located in Coshocton, Union, and Williams counties.

== History ==
In 1809, residents of Cincinnati Township and Springfield Township successfully petitioned the Hamilton County Board of County Commissioners to form a new township corresponding to fractional range two, township three of the Symmes Purchase, a total of 36 square miles (93 km^{2}). Township trustees were first elected in February 1810.

On February 28, 1870, Cincinnati annexed Lick Run and Camp Washington. By 1881, Cincinnati had annexed the village of Cumminsville (now Northside) within the township limits. By 1904, Cincinnati had also annexed the villages of Winton Place (now Spring Grove Village) and Bond Hill. However, there was confusion because no action had been taken to also transfer them from Millcreek Township to Cincinnati Township, which was by then a paper township whose sole purpose was to exclude land from any real township. By 1912, annexations by Cincinnati left Elmwood Place and Wesleyan Cemetery as the only unincorporated portions of the township, prompting an investigation into whether the township should be abolished.

Norwood withdrew from the township around 1938 by forming its own paper township. In 1939 and 1941, Cincinnati attempted to annex the 25-acre (10 ha), unincorporated enclave occupied by the historic Wesleyan Cemetery. However, burial lot owners and relatives of people buried at the cemetery successfully defeated the annexation over fears that the city would run a street through the cemetery. In 1943, St. Bernard and Elmwood Place (now a village) withdrew from the township as well, reducing it to only the cemetery and $517.35 in assets.

Attorney General Thomas J. Herbert issued an opinion that the cemetery enclave should be considered part of Cincinnati and the township should be abolished. However, the matter was not settled: state law required the freeholders within a territory to vote on annexation, but no freeholder remained in the township to vote in favor. The township's one resident of voting age, the cemetery's sexton, did not own the cemetery; conversely, the Wesleyan Cemetery Association's board members did not reside at the cemetery. Meanwhile, the sexton could not simultaneously serve in all three trustee positions that state law requires of a functioning township government. The county also sought to avoid setting up a special polling place for the sexton, which would have required the appointment of six election officers.

In 1950, Cincinnati sued the Wesleyan Cemetery Association in Hamilton County Common Pleas Court to determine whether the city has jurisdiction over the cemetery. Despite being in the middle of an urban area, the cemetery had no provisions for police or fire protection. In 1953, a bill introduced by State Representative Robert F. Reckman to consider remnants of townships with no resident freeholders to be part of municipalities as if they had been annexed was approved by the Governor. On October 20, 1953, the Clerk of Council of the City of Cincinnati issued a certificate and plat stating that that part of Wesleyan Cemetery that was a remnant of Mill Creek Township was then part of the City of Cincinnati. Despite this action by the City, news articles refer to the cemetery as constituting nonfunctioning Millcreek Township as late as 1961.

During the 1990s and 2000s, the cemetery passed from one caretaker to another amid controversy about mismanagement. The cemetery grew unkempt and attracted prostitutes and drug dealers. Attorney General Jim Petro stepped in, obtaining a ruling in Common Pleas Court that removed the caretaker and declared Wesleyan a public cemetery. Cincinnati unsuccessfully fought in court to avoid taking over management of the cemetery.

== Geography ==
The original territory of Millcreek Township was bounded by Cincinnati Township and Storrs Township to the south, Green Township to the west, Springfield Township to the north, and Columbia Township and Spencer Township to the east.

The following villages were at some point located in Millcreek Township:

- Avondale (annexed by Cincinnati)
- Bond Hill (annexed by Cincinnati)
- Carthage (partially in the township; annexed by Cincinnati)
- Clifton (annexed by Cincinnati)
- College Hill (annexed by Cincinnati)
- Cumminsville (annexed by Cincinnati)
- Elmwood Place (incorporated and withdrew)
- Mount Airy (partially in the township; annexed by Cincinnati)
- Norwood (incorporated and withdrew)
- St. Bernard (incorporated and withdrew)
- Winton Place (annexed by Cincinnati)
- Woodburn (annexed by Cincinnati)
