= Murat Halstead =

American journalist (1829–1908)

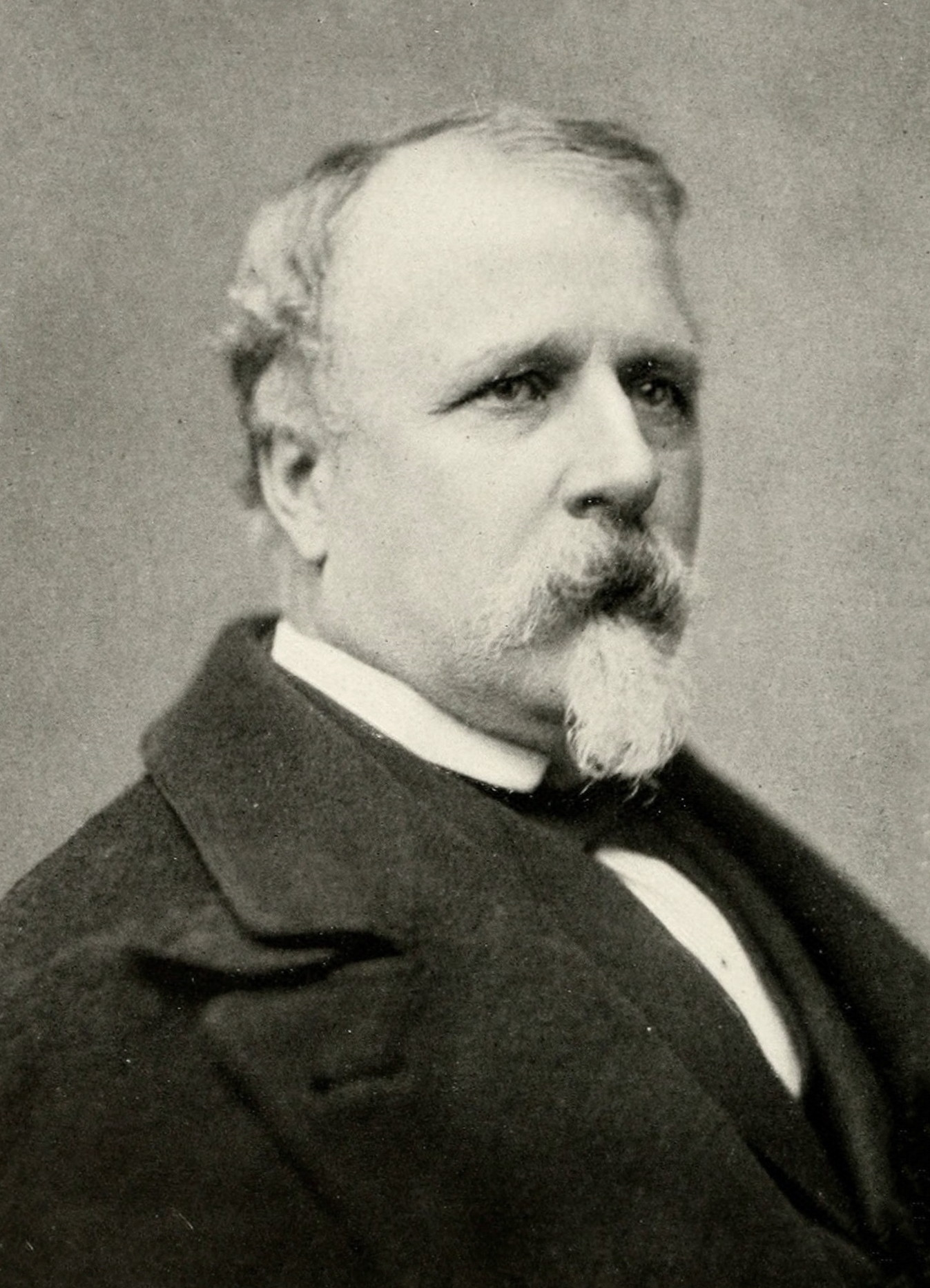
- Born: September 2, 1829; Butler County, Ohio, U.S.
- Died: July 2, 1908 (aged 78); Cincinnati, Ohio, U.S.
- Burial place: Spring Grove Cemetery
- Education: Farmer's College
- Political party: Republican

Murat Halstead (September 2, 1829 – July 2, 1908) was an American newspaper editor and magazine writer. He was an early war correspondent, reporting during three wars, and a zealous ally of the Republican Party.

== Biography ==
Born in Paddy's Run (now Shandon, Ohio) in Butler County, Ohio, he was the son of Griffin Halstead, a farmer. Among Halstead's relatives was Laurence Halstead, the son of Halstead's brother Benton. With his mother's help, he was a reader by the time he was four, and during his boyhood read works such as Plutarch’s Lives, Josephus, Revolutions in Europe and Charles Rollin's Ancient History. He spent the summers on his father's farm and the winters in school until he was nineteen years old, and, after teaching for a few months, in 1848 entered Farmer's College, near Cincinnati, where he graduated in 1851. He then decided to study law.

He had begun writing for newspapers when he was 18, writing for The Hamilton Intelligencer and The Roseville Democrat, two Butler Country papers. While a student near Cincinnati, he contributed to the Commercial and especially to the literary department of the Gazette. After leaving college, he became connected with the Cincinnati Atlas, and then with the Enquirer. He afterward established a Sunday newspaper in Cincinnati, and from 1852 to 1853 worked on the Columbian and Great West, a weekly. He began work on the Commercial on March 8, 1853, as a local reporter, and soon became news editor. The following year, he acquired a pecuniary interest in the paper, which began rapidly to increase in circulation and influence. He reported on the hanging of John Brown in 1859, and later personally reported from several battles during the Civil War. He was also a war correspondent for the Franco-Prussian War, where he sided emphatically with the Germans.

In 1867, he acquired a controlling interest in the Commercial. After pursuing for a time a course of independent journalism, he allied himself with the Republican Party. In 1870, he also played a leading role in the founding of the Western Associated Press, a midwestern agency which was one of the forerunners of the modern Associated Press. The Cincinnati Gazette was consolidated with his paper in 1883, and he became president of the company that published the combined journal under the name of the Commercial Gazette, also a recognized organ of the Republicans.

Halstead attended and reported upon every major party's presidential nominating convention from February 1856, when he attended the "Know-Nothing" convention that nominated Millard Fillmore, until his death in 1908. In an essay for the magazine Quest, American journalist and historian Garry Wills ranked Halstead above H.L. Mencken as "the classic reporter of our conventions," illustrating Halstead's penchant for fun invective with, among other things, his raucous description of Stephen Douglas:

An exposed political empyric; a dishonest truckler for unsound popularity; a false pretender to notions of honor, and a foul-mouthed bully self convicted of cowardice, though a coat of whitewash a foot in thickness would not cause him to pass for a gentleman, it cannot be denied that he will make a most admirable candidate.

In 1890, he moved to Brooklyn, New York, where he edited the Standard Union, though he continued to write for the Commercial Gazette. President Benjamin Harrison nominated him for Minister to Germany, but the nomination was rejected by the Senate, perhaps due to editorials he had written accusing some senators of purchasing their seats.

Halstead in The Story of the Philippines and Our New Possessions (1898)

At the start of the Spanish–American War, he became a war correspondent and went to the Philippines. His later years he spent writing books, mainly biographies, and contributing articles to magazines. He died at his home in Cincinnati on July 2, 1908, being survived by his wife and nine children. He was buried at Spring Grove Cemetery. His son Marshall, at one time United States consul in Birmingham, England, predeceased him.

== Works ==
His reports from the 1860 presidential election have been collected as Three against Lincoln; Murat Halstead reports the caucuses of 1860, ed. William Best Hesseltine. Baton Rouge, Louisiana State University Press, 1960. OCLC 337677.

He also wrote a number of books, including:

- Life of Jay Gould: How he made his millions, 1892
- The story of Cuba her struggles for liberty; the cause, crisis and destiny of the Pearl of the Antilles, 1896 and 1898
- Our Country in War and Relations with All Nations, 1898
- The story of the Philippines. Natural riches, industrial resources, statistics of productions, commerce and population; the laws, habits, customs, scenery, and conditions of the Cuba of the East Indies, and the thousand islands of the archipelagoes of India and Hawaii, with episodes of their early history ... Events of the war in the west with Spain, and the conquest of Cuba and Porto Rico, 1898
- Pictorial history of America's new possessions, the isthmian canals, and the problem of expansion, 1898
- Life and achievement of Admiral Dewey from Montpelier to Manila, 1899
- Galveston the horrors of a stricken city; portraying by pen and picture the awful calamity that befell the Queen city on the gulf and the terrible scenes that followed the disaster, 1900, reprinted 1980
- Life and Reign of Queen Victoria, 1901 (with A. J. Munson)
- The illustrious life of William McKinley: our martyred president, 1901
- War Between Russia and Japan, 1904

He contributed to these newspapers and magazines:

- Editor for Cincinnati Commercial (merged into Cincinnati Commercial Gazette)
- Editor for Brooklyn Standard Union
- Published articles for Cosmopolitan Monthly
