= Laurence Halstead =

United States Army general (1875–1953)

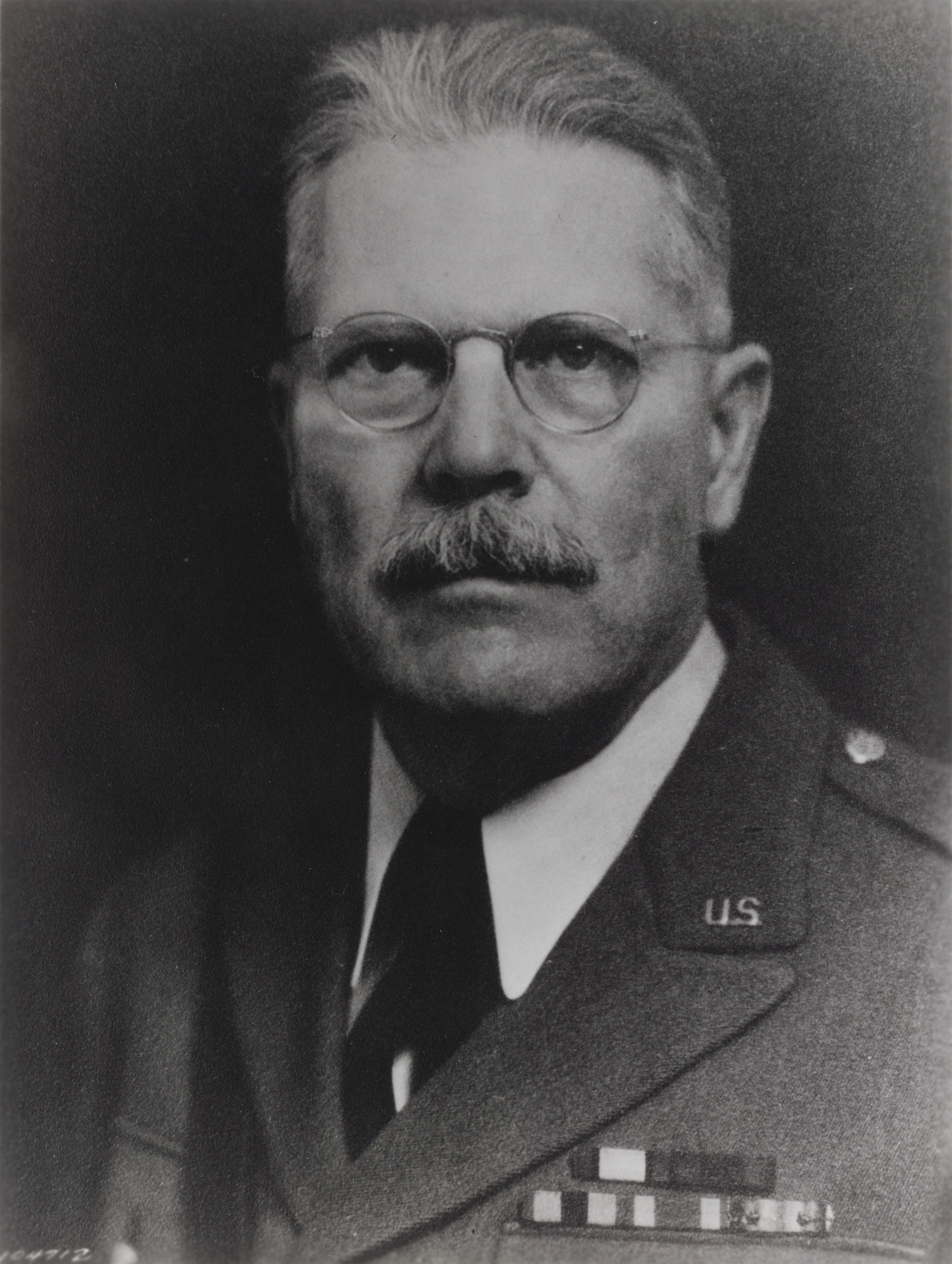
- Halstead as a brigadier general
- Born: 21 October 1875; Riverside, Cincinnati, Ohio, US
- Died: 5 June 1953 (aged 77); Washington, D.C., US
- Burial place: Arlington National Cemetery
- Alma mater: United States Military Academy
- Spouse: Anna Louise Maus (m. 1903–1953)
- Children: 2
- Relatives: Murat Halstead (uncle)
- Military career
- Service: United States Army
- Service years: 1899–1938
- Rank: Brigadier General
- Service number: O-775
- Unit: US Army Infantry Branch
- Commands: Army Disciplinary Barracks, Fort Alcatraz; 27th Infantry Regiment; 12th Infantry Regiment; Fort Howard; Pacific Sector, Panama Canal Zone; 1st Infantry Division
- Wars: Philippine–American War; Moro Rebellion; Mexican Border War; World War I
- Awards: Army Distinguished Service Medal

Laurence Halstead (21 October 1875 – 5 June 1953) was a career officer in the United States Army. A veteran of the Philippine–American War, Moro Rebellion, Mexican Border War, and World War I, he attained the rank of brigadier general. Halstead's commands included the 1st Infantry Division, and he was a recipient of the Army Distinguished Service Medal.

A native of the Riverside neighborhood of Cincinnati, he graduated from the United States Military Academy (West Point) in 1899. Halstead was commissioned in the Infantry and served in the Philippines during the Philippine–American War. Subsequent assignments included commander of the disciplinary barracks on Alcatraz Island, and he was a 1910 graduate of the Army School of the Line and a 1911 graduate of the United States Army Command and General Staff College.

During World War I, Halstead served as chief of staff for the 84th Division, then chief of operations (G-3) for First U.S. Army. After the war, he graduated from the United States Army War College, commanded two Infantry regiments, and commanded the Pacific Sector of the Panama Canal Zone. Halstead commanded the 1st Infantry Division in late 1937 and early 1938, and retired for disability as a brigadier general in May 1938.

In retirement, Halstead resided in Washington, D.C. He died in Washington on 5 June 1953. He was buried at Arlington National Cemetery.

== Early life ==
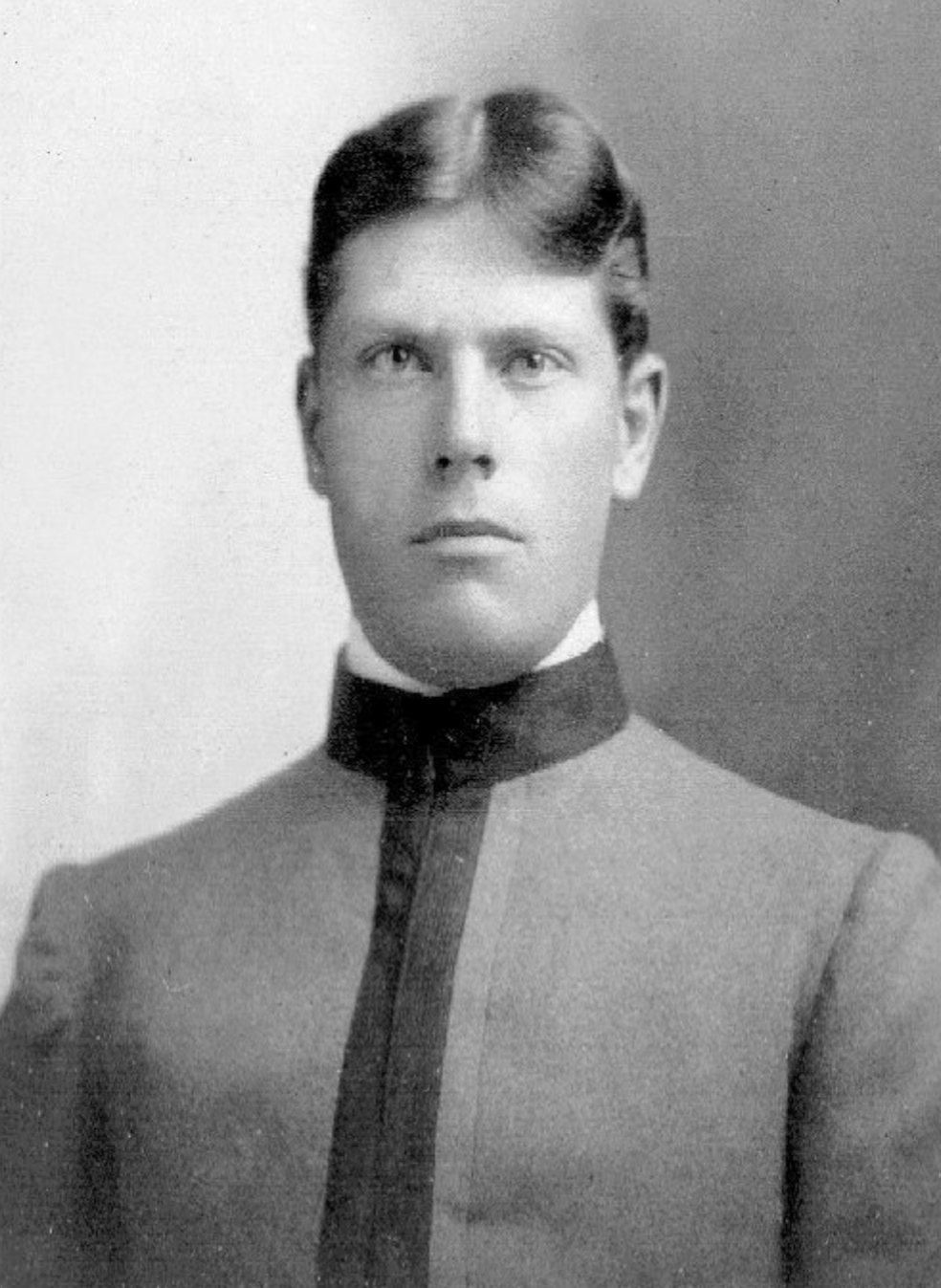
Halstead at West Point c. 1899

Laurence Halstead (Note: His name is spelled "Lawrence" in some records and news articles.) was born in the Riverside neighborhood of Cincinnati, Ohio on 21 October 1875, a son of Colonel Benton Halstead, a Union Army veteran of the American Civil War, and Rowena (Smith) Halstead. Among his relatives was journalist Murat Halstead, who was his uncle. Halstead was raised and educated in Cincinnati, and was a graduate of Hughes High School. In July 1894, Halstead received an appointment to the United States Military Academy at West Point from US Representative John A. Caldwell. He passed the entrance examinations in 1895 and joined the class that began courses in June.

Halstead graduated in February 1899 ranked 46th of 72 and received his commission as a second lieutenant of Infantry. Among his classmates who attained prominence as general officers were: James A. Woodruff; Edward Murphy Markham; Leon Kromer; Charles Romeyn; George S. Simonds; Stanley Dunbar Embick; Clement A. Trott; George Van Horn Moseley; Wilson Bryant Burtt; Stuart Heintzelman; and Charles D. Herron. After receiving his commission, Halstead was assigned to the 11th Infantry Regiment, which was performing post-Spanish–American War duty in Puerto Rico.

== Start of career ==
Halstead served with the 11th Infantry from March 1899 to August 1900. From April 1901 to July 1902, he served with his regiment in the Philippines during the Philippine–American War. In October 1900, he received promotion to first lieutenant. From July 1902 to October 1903, he was adjutant of a battalion of the 11th Infantry at Fort McDowell, California. From October 1903 to October 1905, he commanded the Army Disciplinary Barracks at Fort Alcatraz, California.

From November 1905 to November 1907, he was assigned to recruiting duty in Huntington, West Virginia. In October 1906, he was promoted to captain in the 6th Infantry Regiment. From December 1907 to July 1909, Halstead commanded a company of the 6th Infantry at Fort Missoula, Montana. In 1910, Halstead graduated from the Army School of the Line. In 1911, he completed the program of instruction at the United States Army Command and General Staff College, 1911. From August 1912 to June 1913, he was a member of the faculty at the staff college. In March 1913, Halstead was transferred to the 8th Infantry.

== Continued career ==
Halstead commanded a company of the 8th Infantry at Pettit Barracks, Philippines from July to October 1913, near the end of the Moro Rebellion. He remained in command of his company during its duty in Manila from November 1913 to January 1914. From January 1914 to September 1915, he commanded his company at Fort Mills. He transferred to the 24th Infantry in September 1915, and he returned to the United States in October. From October 1915 to February 1916, he was posted to the Presidio of San Francisco. In February and March 1916, he served at Fort D. A. Russell, Wyoming.

From March to July 1916, Halstead carried out Mexican Border War duty in Columbus, New Mexico. In July, he was detailed to duty with the Quartermaster Corps in Laredo, Texas. In March 1917, he was assigned as assistant to the quartermaster at the Philadelphia Quartermaster Depot. He was promoted to major in May 1917, and he performed staff duty in the office of the army's Quartermaster General in July and August 1917. With the army expanding following American entry into World War I in April 1917, Halstead was promoted to temporary lieutenant colonel on 5 August.

Halstead served as chief of staff of the 84th Division during its initial organization and training at Camp Zachary Taylor, Kentucky. From December 1917 to February 1918, he took part in an observation tour of front lines in France in order to view firsthand the most current combat tactics and techniques. He continued to serve with the division after its arrival in France and was promoted to temporary colonel in July 1918. In October, he was attached temporarily to the staff of the 3rd Division. From the end of the war in November 1918 until April 1919, he performed post-war Occupation of the Rhineland duty as chief of operations (G-3) on the staff of First U.S. Army. In April and May 1919, he was an instructor at the Army Center of Artillery Studies in Trier, Germany. Beginning in May 1919, Halstead was assigned to the American Expeditionary Forces headquarters staff in Chaumont, Haute-Marne, where he was a member of the historical section.

== Later career ==
From August 1919 to July 1920, Halstead was an instructor at the Command and General Staff College and he was reduced to his permanent rank of major on 31 August 1919. He was promoted to lieutenant colonel in July 1920 and served as chief of staff of the 6th Division at Camp Grant, Illinois from September 1920 to January 1921. From January 1921 to June 1922, he was assigned as assistant chief of staff of the Fifth Corps Area. Halstead was promoted to colonel in July 1921. He was assigned to the staff at the United States Department of War from June 1922 to June 1924, after which he attended the United States Army War College, from which he graduated in 1925. From July to November 1925, Halstead served in the Office of the Chief of Infantry. From January 1926 to August 1928, he commanded the 27th Infantry Regiment at Schofield Barracks, Hawaii.

From December 1928 to June 1929, Halstead was chief of National Guard affairs for Fourth Corps Area in Atlanta. From July 1929 to March 1931, he served as chief of staff for the Seventh Corps Area based at Fort Omaha, Nebraska. From April 1931 to October 1934, he was based in Washington, D.C. as executive officer to the army's Chief of Infantry. From October 1934 to August 1935, he commanded the 12th Infantry Regiment and the post of Fort Howard, Maryland. From August to November 1935, Halstead commanded the Pacific Sector of the Panama Canal Zone, and he was promoted to brigadier general in September 1935. In December 1937 and January 1938, he commanded the 1st Infantry Division at Fort Wadsworth, New York. Halstead applied to retire for disability in early 1938, which was approved in May, a few months before he would have reached the mandatory retirement age of 64.

In retirement, Halstead was a resident of Washington, D.C. Among his hobbies were painting and poetry writing, and he shared his works with family and friends. He also became a boating enthusiast, was active in Washington's Corinthian Yacht Club, and operated his own cabin cruiser. He requested a return to active duty for World War II, which was denied because he had been diagnosed with heart disease. Halstead died in Washington on 5 June 1953. Halstead was buried at Arlington National Cemetery.

== Awards ==
In 1922, Halstead was awarded the Army Distinguished Service Medal to commend his superior performance during the First World War. The citation read:

The President of the United States of America, authorized by Act of Congress, July 9, 1918, takes pleasure in presenting the Army Distinguished Service Medal to Colonel (Infantry) Laurence Halstead, United States Army, for exceptionally meritorious and distinguished services to the Government of the United States, in a duty of great responsibility during World War I. As Officer in Charge of Quartermaster Schools and Assistant to Officer in Charge of Administrative Division, Office of the Quartermaster General from April to August 1917, Colonel Halstead rendered valuable service in the organization and operation of these schools. As Chief of Staff, 84th Division, from August 1917 to November 1918, by his marked efficiency, loyal devotion to duty, and high military attainments, he played an important part in the successful organization, training, and operations of that Division. Later as Assistant Chief of Staff, G-3, 1st Army, from November 1918 to April 1919, he performed many tasks of great responsibility in a highly meritorious manner.

Service: United States Army Rank: Colonel (Infantry) Division: 1st Army Corps, American Expeditionary Forces Action Date: World War I Orders: War Department, General Orders No. 49 (1922)

== Dates of rank ==
Halstead's dates of rank were:

- Second Lieutenant, 15 February 1899
- First Lieutenant, 9 October 1900
- Captain, 20 October 1906
- Major (National Army), 15 May 1917
- Lieutenant Colonel (National Army), 5 August 1917
- Major, 16 October 1917
- Colonel (National Army), 30 July 1918
- Major, 31 August 1919
- Lieutenant Colonel, 1 July 1920
- Colonel, 26 July 1921
- Brigadier General, 1 September 1935
- Brigadier General (Retired), 31 May 1938
