= Paper township =

Type of civil township in Ohio

The term paper township refers to a civil township under Ohio law that nominally exists for certain purposes but does not act as a functioning unit of civil government. Such townships usually exist on paper as a legal fiction due to municipal annexation.

== Formation ==
Almost all territory within Ohio is at least nominally part of a township. Whenever a township falls entirely within a single municipality, or is coextensive with a single municipality, the township government is automatically abolished and consolidated with the municipal government under Ohio Rev. Code §703.22. This condition can be met in multiple ways:

- A municipality may annex territory until it becomes coextensive with the township. For example, the City of Cincinnati was originally located in Cincinnati Township in Hamilton County; the city annexed the township's remaining unincorporated territory in 1834.
- A township may be incorporated wholesale as a municipality. For example, in 1955, the residents of Van Buren Township in Montgomery County voted to incorporate as the Village of Kettering.
- A municipality may withdraw from its surrounding township, creating a township coextensive with the municipality that only exists on paper for the purpose of satisfying the requirement that the entire county lies within a township.

Under other provisions of state law, a township can exist nominally in rump form without a government if the remaining unincorporated portion of a township does not meet the requirements for incorporation or annexation.

In limited cases, territory may fall in no township when either:

- a township successfully petitions under Ohio Rev. Code §503.09 to create a new township exclusive of that part included in municipalities; or
- a township merges into a municipality under Ohio Rev. Code §709.43 through Ohio Rev. Code §709.48.

=== Withdrawal ===
The City of Loveland is divided into three paper townships named Loveland Township, each in a different county. From 2003 to 2010, annexed property in the northeastern corner of the city was part of Hamilton Township rather than Loveland Township.

In a legal procedure known as withdrawal, a municipality may request that the board of county commissioners modify the overlapping township's boundaries to exclude the municipality, and erect a new township coextensive with the municipality. The township effectively never exists because its government is immediately abolished. This legal fiction is common among the state's largest cities and popular among cities and villages in southwestern Ohio, where township government is seen as redundant to municipal government and a cause of higher taxation.

A city or village that overlaps with multiple townships only needs to create a single paper township to withdraw from each township. Because Ohio law does not forbid townships from being located in multiple counties, a municipality in multiple counties may petition multiple county boards of commissioners to create a single paper township shared among all the counties, or petition to create separate paper townships in each county. For example, both Butler and Hamilton counties share a nominal Heritage Township that corresponds with the City of Fairfield; on the other hand, Hamilton, Clermont, and Warren counties each have a separate, nominal Loveland Township that corresponds to part of the City of Loveland. When the municipality annexes additional land, township boundaries must be explicitly adjusted to reflect the change; otherwise, the annexation remains in the original township as well as the municipality. Under 1953 case law, a paper township may not be considered an adjoining township for the purpose of dissolving a township.

=== Unpopulated townships ===
A township can consist of unincorporated territory but lack a government because it has no resident population. On January 23, 1981, Wayne Township in Montgomery County was re-incorporated as the city of Huber Heights. However, a small portion of Wayne Township east of the Mad River was part of Wright-Patterson Air Force Base. Under Ohio Rev. Code §709.01, territory on military installations can not be incorporated without the approval of the Secretary of Defense. Thus, that portion of Wayne Township still nominally exists, but has no local government. It is currently the only unpopulated township in Ohio. Decades earlier in 1943, Millcreek Township in Hamilton County became defunct, leaving no local government, after annexations by Cincinnati and withdrawals by other villages reduced the township to only a cemetery without even a resident property owner eligible to vote for annexation.

== Prevalence ==
As of the 2010 Census, 15 townships in Ohio had no government because a city or village had become coextensive with it, and one because it had no population. A total of 258 municipal corporations (179 cities and 79 villages) have fully or partially withdrawn from functioning townships to create paper townships. Of those partially withdrawn, 24 are cities and three are villages.

== Naming convention ==
A paper township may or may not share the municipality's name. County commissioners may assign a distinct name to avoid giving a paper township the same name as an existing township in the same county. For example, when Fairfield withdrew from Fairfield Township, Butler County officials named the paper township "Heritage" to avoid the confusion of two adjacent but distinct Fairfield Townships. The United States Census Bureau does not recognize these names, instead creating a fictitious name.

Examples of paper townships named differently than municipalities
Municipality	Paper township	Meaning of name
Canal Fulton	Milan Township	One of two villages that Canal Fulton annexed in the 1850s.
Celina	Wayne Township	The original name of Noble Township, Auglaize County, from when that township was part of Mercer County.
Delaware	Delaware City Township	The township is coextensive with the city.
Fairfield	Heritage Township, Butler County; Heritage Township, Hamilton County	A failed 1995 proposal would have incorporated two nearby townships in Hamilton and Warren counties as the City of Heritage.
Grafton	Rawsonville Township	Grafton was previously named Rawsonville from 1852 to 1877.
Louisville	Constitution Township	Louisville is nicknamed "The Constitution Town".
North Canton	Hoover Township	William Henry Hoover, the first mayor of North Canton.
Vermilion	Old Vermilion Township	
Wadsworth	Pardee Township	Aaron Pardee, the first mayor of Wadsworth. Unnamed from 1964 to 2003.

== Economic implications ==
Municipalities can dramatically reduce a real township's territory and tax base by withdrawing from the township and subsequently annexing additional territory. Columbia Township in Hamilton County and Lemon Township in Butler County were once large and populous but gradually shrank to small, discontiguous neighborhoods as surrounding cities and villages withdrew and continued to annex township land. To remain viable, a township may merge with another township or municipality either through a referendum or with the consent of the relevant boards of trustees or councils.

Since 2002, a municipality must reimburse a township for lost tax revenue when land is transferred to a paper township after annexation. Previously, the reimbursement had to take place upon annexation, even if the land remained within the original township.

In 1965, the paper Boston Heights Township was used as part of a legal maneuver to grant a liquor license to a motel, circumventing state law that prohibited such licenses in incorporated areas.

== Political implications ==
Paper townships are a relatively obscure phenomenon that can create major surprises in election administration. In 1890, a defunct, largely forgotten Storrs Township in Hamilton County upended the Ohio Democratic Party's gerrymandering scheme, potentially affecting the balance of power in the United States House of Representatives, when a state redistricting act was inadvertently worded in a way that failed to place the township's residents in any congressional district. A joint congressional resolution was introduced to temporarily revert the districts to their former boundaries.

== See also ==
- Administrative divisions of Ohio
- Coterminous municipality
- Defunct townships of Cuyahoga County, Ohio
- Paper street
- Urban secession
