= Rapid Run Park =

Park in Hamilton County, Ohio, United States of America

Coordinates: 39°07′02″N 84°35′23″W

Rapid Run Park is an urban park in the Price Hill neighborhood of Cincinnati, Ohio, United States.

The park features a lake with a stone park shelter, built in 1941. There are hiking paths along the hilly terrain, a playground, and a baseball diamond.
