= Storrs Township, Hamilton County, Ohio =

Coordinates: 39.106°N 84.569°W

An 1856 map of Hamilton County depicting Storrs Township at its original size in yellow.

Storrs Township was a civil township in south-central Hamilton County, Ohio. It was established in 1835 and annexed to Cincinnati in 1870 but remained in nominal form until at least 1890 due to an oversight.

== Name ==
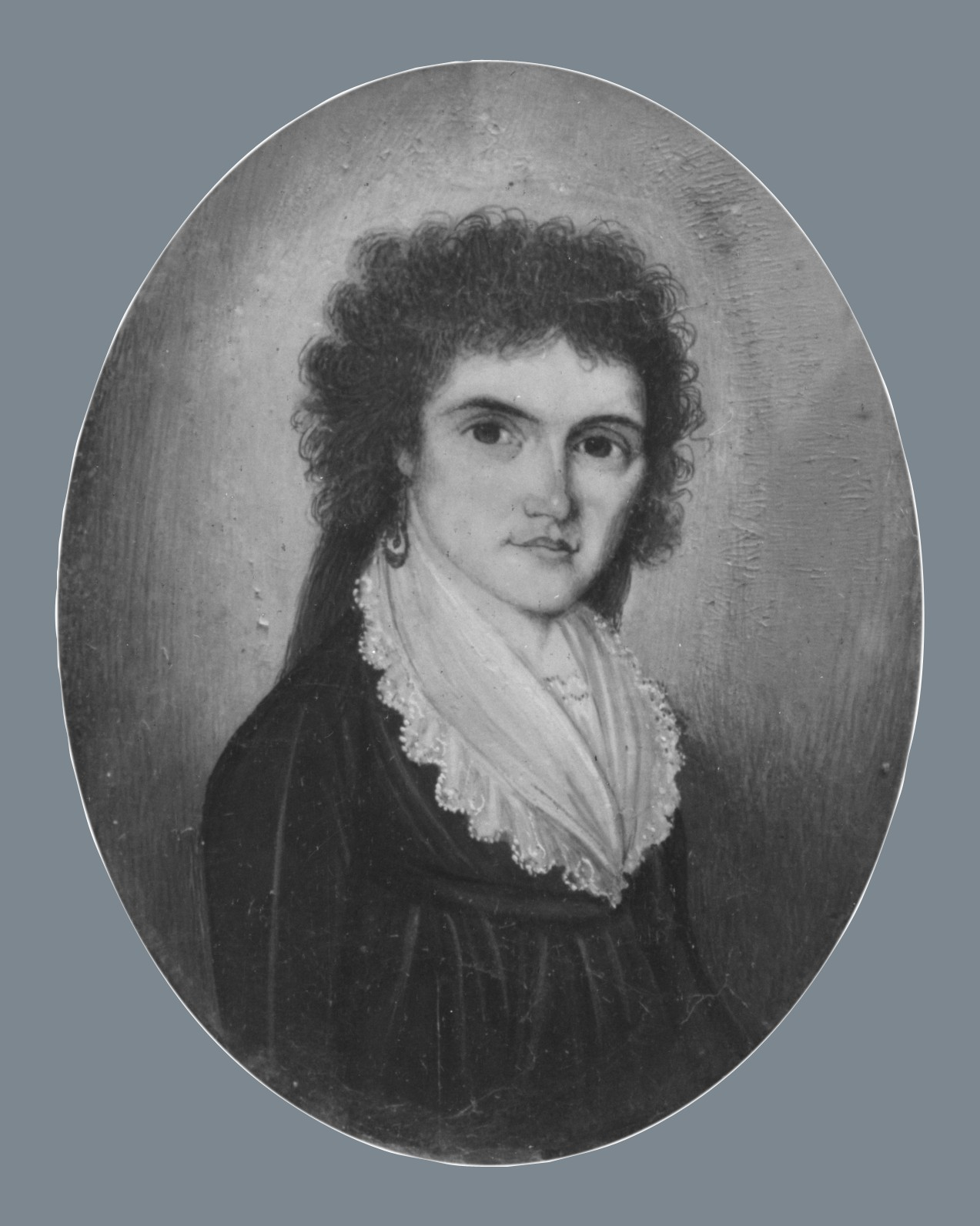
Mrs. Ethan Stone (Abigail Maria Storrs)

Storrs Township was named after Abigail Maria Storrs, the wife of Ethan Stone. Stone was a lawyer who went into banking after becoming blind. He was a Federalist member of the Ohio General Assembly from 1805 to 1806 and became president of the Bank of Cincinnati in 1814.

== History ==
The land that would become Storrs Township was included in the 1794 Symmes Purchase. In 1810, Ethan Stone, an influential former state representative and investor, convinced the Ohio General Assembly to lease to him Section 29 of Cincinnati Township, which he would then sublet. The lease was amended in 1821, allowing him to rent the section for $40 annually for 99 years, renewable in perpetuity. It would prove lucrative to Stone.

In 1835, Cincinnati Township was abolished due to annexations by the City of Cincinnati, and Storrs Township was erected from the western portion of Cincinnati Township that included the Stone estate. The same year, Sedamsville was incorporated as a village within the township limits.

Storrs Township's location on the Ohio River near Cincinnati made it a stop for fugitive slaves following the Underground Railroad into Ohio. In a high-profile incident in 1856, Margaret Garner escaped into Storrs Township with her family before killing or wounding her children in a bid to keep them out of the hands of slave catchers. Under the Fugitive Slave Act of 1850, she was returned to her enslaver in Kentucky.

On November 12, 1869, the Hamilton County Board of County Commissioners granted Cincinnati's request to annex Storrs Township, including the villages of Sedamsville and Price Hill, but excluding the small portion already incorporated as the Village of Riverside. These annexations took effect on February 28, 1870. In 1887, the annexed territory was also transferred from Storrs Township to Cincinnati Township, to ensure that Cincinnati and its paper township remained coextensive.

In 1890, at the end of a congressional redistricting process, the Ohio Republican Party discovered that, when the county commissioners annexed the eastern portion of Storrs Township to Cincinnati Township, they had neglected to attach the remaining 22 square miles (57 km^{2}) within Riverside to Delhi Township. The 200 eligible voters in Riverside voted in their own precinct, still nominally in Storrs Township. The wording of the redistricting act inadvertently omitted this precinct from any congressional district. This discrepancy had been overlooked in the 1882, 1884, and 1886 redistricting acts but gave the Republicans a last-minute opportunity to invalidate the Ohio Democratic Party's newest gerrymandering scheme and gain multiple seats in the United States House of Representatives.

== Geography ==
In its original form, Storrs Township was bounded by the Ohio River to the south, Delhi Township to the west, Millcreek Township to the north, and Cincinnati to the east across Mill Creek. This area today corresponds to the Cincinnati neighborhoods of Sedamsville, Lower Price Hill, and East Price Hill, as well as the easternmost part of Riverside.

== Transportation ==
In 1847, the Ohio General Assembly established a road district within the township for the purpose of grading and paving streets. In the 1850s, two plank roads ran through the township, one of them a toll road called the Storrs Township Turnpike and the other a free road leading to the Anderson Ferry.

== Ministerial lands ==
The section leased to Ethan Stone was the township's ministerial land, with a stipulation that proceeds from the sale or sublease of land were to be used for the funding of Christian churches and schools in the township. The state administered the land, collected rent, and disbursed the funds to the churches. In 1949, five churches in the former Storrs Township filed with the City of Cincinnati to receive disbursements totaling $3,000. In 1968, the Ohio State Auditor stopped disbursing the funds after the United States Supreme Court declared such arrangements unconstitutional. In 1973, the auditor was authorized to sell the land to the 145 lessees of 791.10 acres (320.15 ha) in Green, Delhi, and Storrs townships for one year's rent, with the proceeds going to local school districts.

Stone's considerable profit from sublets was also subject to the ministerial provision. At his death in 1852, the proceeds were valued at over $32,000 annually. The funds were originally directed to the Episcopal Diocese of Southern Ohio, but in 1893, the Hamilton County Probate Court ordered that trust funds be disbursed to a church chosen in an election every ten years. By the time the case was closed on March 22, 2019, 167 years after Stone's death, it was the longest open trust case in Ohio and presumably the oldest active court case in the United States.
