= Cincinnati Township, Hamilton County, Ohio =

Paper township in Ohio, US

Cincinnati Township is a paper township and former civil township in south-central Hamilton County, Ohio. Originally one of Ohio's largest townships by area at its inception in 1791, it was abolished in 1834 when the City of Cincinnati became coextensive with it through annexation. Since then, it has remained solely as a paper township.

== Name ==
Cincinnati Township is named after Cincinnati, the second white settlement in the historical Miami Valley, after Columbia. At the time of the township's establishment, Cincinnati was an unincorporated settlement. Statewide, no other township is named Cincinnati.

== History ==
Cincinnati Township was formed on February 2, 1791, a year after Hamilton County was organized, when the court of general quarter sessions of the peace divided the southern part of the county into Columbia, Cincinnati, and Miami townships, each extending from the Ohio River north past the present-day Butler County line. Each township was assigned a standard cattle brand; historians have considered Cincinnati Township to be the county's second township, on account of its cattle brand of "B". The boundaries were defined as:

Beginning at a point where the second meridian east of the town (Cincinnati) intersects the Ohio; thence down that stream about eleven miles to the first meridian east of Rapid Run; thence north to the Big Miami; thence up that stream to the south line of the military range; thence south to the place of beginning.

Cincinnati Township was one of the largest townships in Ohio. The three townships included virtually all the white residents of the Symmes Purchase; in the midst of the Northwest Indian War, conflicts with indigenous peoples continued to take place to the north until the Treaty of Greenville.

The township gradually shrank as Hamilton County's population grew. By the signing of the Treaty of Greenville in 1795, the court of general quarter sessions of the peace had created Colerain and South Bend townships out of the western part of Cincinnati Township and Springfield and Fairfield townships out of its northern reaches. In 1803, the township's boundaries were changed again:

Commencing at the southeast corner of Miami township, on the Ohio river; thence north to the northwest corner of section seventeen, in fractional range two, township two; thence east nine miles; thence south to the Ohio; thence westward along the Ohio to the place of beginning.

In 1809, residents of northern Cincinnati Township and southern Springfield Township successfully petitioned the Hamilton County Board of County Commissioners to form Millcreek Township, effective the next year.

Cincinnati incorporated as a town in 1802 and was chartered as a city in 1819.

Cincinnati steadily grew by annexing adjacent territory within Cincinnati Township. In 1829, J.D. Garrard and Sarah Bella Garrard sold 10 acres (4.0 ha) of land to the township's board of trustees. In 1834, the township trustees swapped this land for an outlot owned by the City of Cincinnati. The Garrard land eventually became Lincoln Park, later the parking lot for Union Terminal's shopping mall, while the outlot became Music Hall.

Also in 1834, Cincinnati annexed the last remaining unincorporated neighborhood within the township, Mount Adams, and abolished township elections in a new city charter adopted on March 1 of that year. In 1835, Storrs Township was erected from the unincorporated western part of Cincinnati Township.

Cincinnati Township's boundaries grew with the city's expansion northward into Millcreek Township, beginning with the "Northern Liberties" district around Findlay Market on April 14, 1849. Cincinnati also expanded eastward into Spencer and Columbia townships, beginning with Fulton in 1855. To the west, most of Storrs Township was annexed in 1869 but was not added to Cincinnati Township until 1887.

Cincinnati's rapid expansion into neighboring townships repeatedly created confusion over the status of those townships. In 1890, at the end of a congressional redistricting process, the Ohio Republican Party discovered that, when the county commissioners annexed the eastern portion of Storrs Township to Cincinnati Township, they had neglected to attach the remaining 22 square miles (57 km^{2}) within Riverside to Delhi Township. The 200 eligible voters in Riverside voted in their own precinct, still nominally in Storrs Township. The wording of the redistricting act inadvertently omitted this precinct from any congressional district. This discrepancy had been overlooked in the 1882, 1884, and 1886 redistricting acts but gave the Republicans a last-minute opportunity to invalidate the Ohio Democratic Party's newest gerrymandering scheme and gain multiple seats in the United States House of Representatives. By 1904, officials were again uncertain whether township boundaries would need to be amended following further annexations by the city into Millcreek and Columbia townships.

== Geography ==
At its inception and greatest extent, Cincinnati Township was bounded by the northern bank of the Ohio River to the south, Miami Township to the west, the "Indian boundary line" to the north, and Columbia Township to the east. Today, this area encompasses most of the City of Cincinnati and most of Springfield, Colerain, Green, and Delhi townships, extending north into Butler County.

At its nadir from 1834 to 1869, when it had already been fully incorporated into the City of Cincinnati, Cincinnati Township was bounded by the Ohio River, Storrs Township to the west, Millcreek Township to the north, and Spencer Township to the east.
