= Ministerial Lands =

Ohio lands granted to clergy 1785-1911

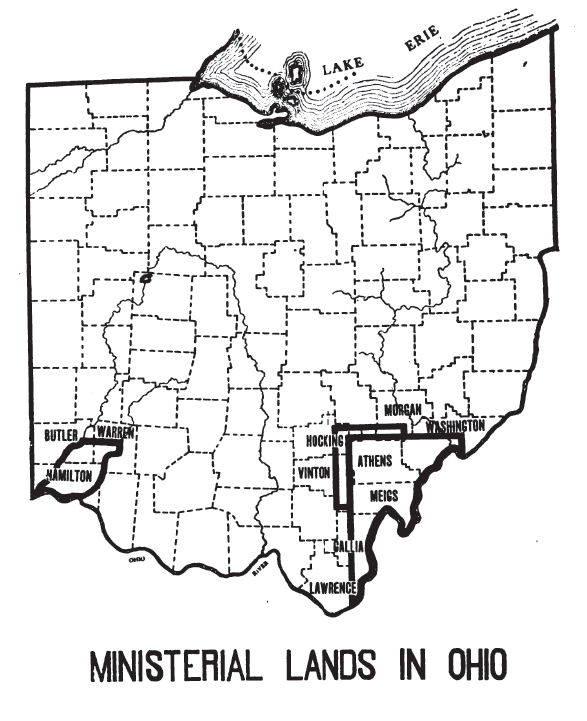
Areas in Ohio with Ministerial Lands

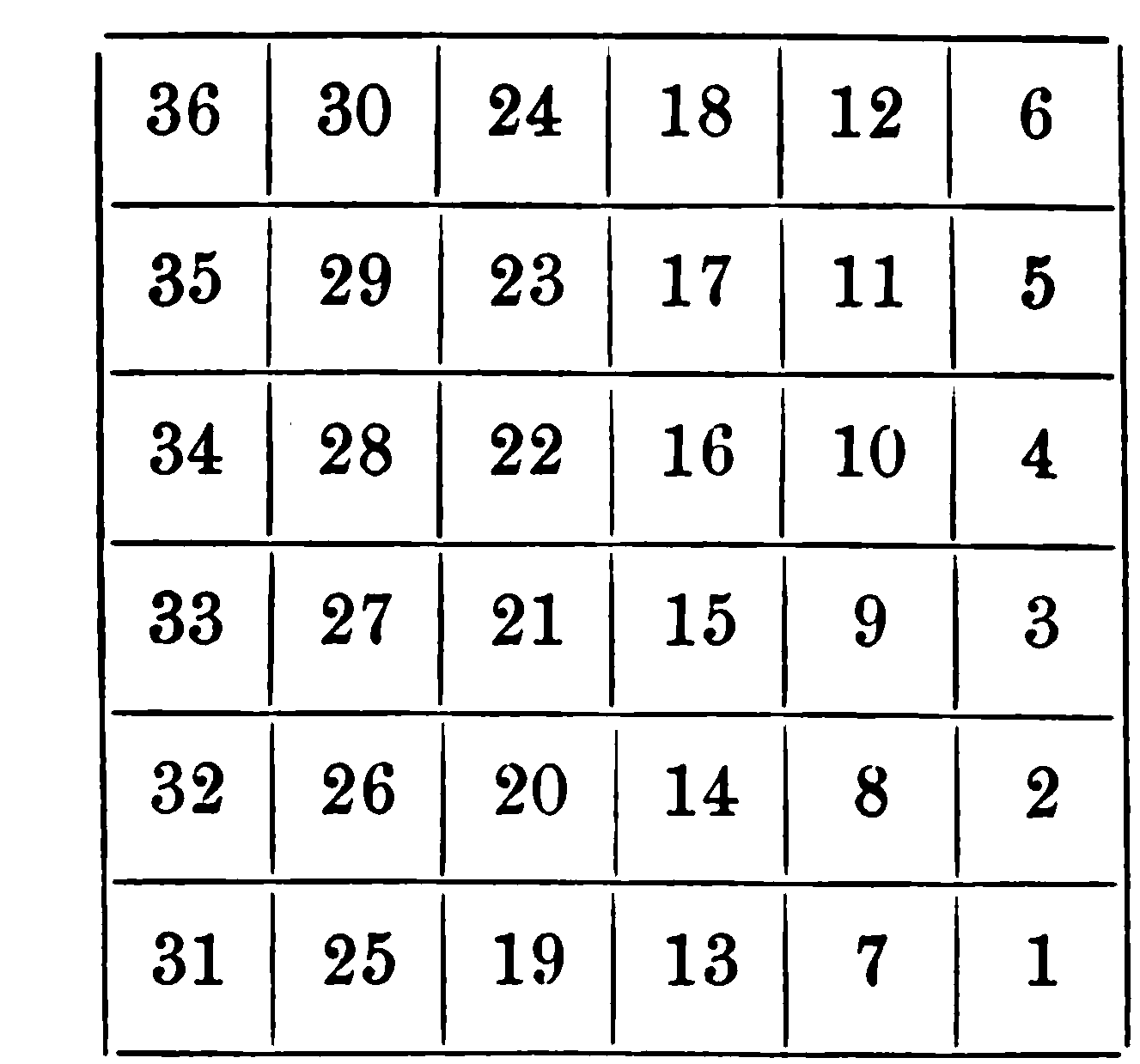
The plan for numbering sections of a township was adopted May 20, 1785. Section 29 was devoted to support of clergy in two land sales.

The Ministerial Lands were tracts of land in the Northwest Territory, later Ohio, that the Congress donated for the support of clergy.

In the contracts that the Congress wrote for purchases of large tracts of land in the Northwest Territory in the 1780s by the Ohio Company of Associates and John Cleve Symmes, tracts of land were set aside for support of religion. This was before the passage of the Bill of Rights. These land purchases were divided into townships six miles square arranged on a checkerboard pattern. Each township was further divided into one mile square sections numbered systematically from 1 to 36. In the Ohio Company and Symmes purchases, section 29 of each township, except the two townships set aside to support Ohio University, was set aside for support of religion. Ohio’s Ministerial Lands totaled 43,525 acres (176.14 km^{2}). Monies realized from the leasing or sale of section 29 were to be distributed to the township’s churches on a pro rata basis according to each denomination’s membership. The legislature of the state was designated to be the trustee for the ministerial lands in the first purchase of the Ohio Company and the Symmes Purchase by Congress, while the trustees of the Ohio Company designated the legislature as trustee of the sections in their second purchase.

In 1833, Congress authorized Ohio to sell Ministerial Lands and invest proceeds in a fund to support religion in the various townships in which they sat. This lasted until 1968, when the constitutionality of such church-state relationships was challenged. Congress then authorized the remaining ministerial funds to be disbursed for schools. In May 1968, Ohio voters approved a constitutional amendment that directed any future ministerial income be used solely for educational purposes.

Grants by the government for support of religion came to an end in 1811, when President Monroe vetoed a bill providing relief for a Baptist society that had built a church on government land in Salem, Mississippi. He argued that the bill “comprises a principle and precedent for the appropriation of funds of the United States for the use and support of religious societies, contrary to the article of the Constitution which declares that Congress shall make no law respecting a religious establishment.”

== See also ==
- Ohio Lands
- Storrs Township, Hamilton County, Ohio
