= Bond Hill, Cincinnati =

Neighborhood of Cincinnati, Ohio

Bond Hill
- Neighborhood of Cincinnati
- Flag

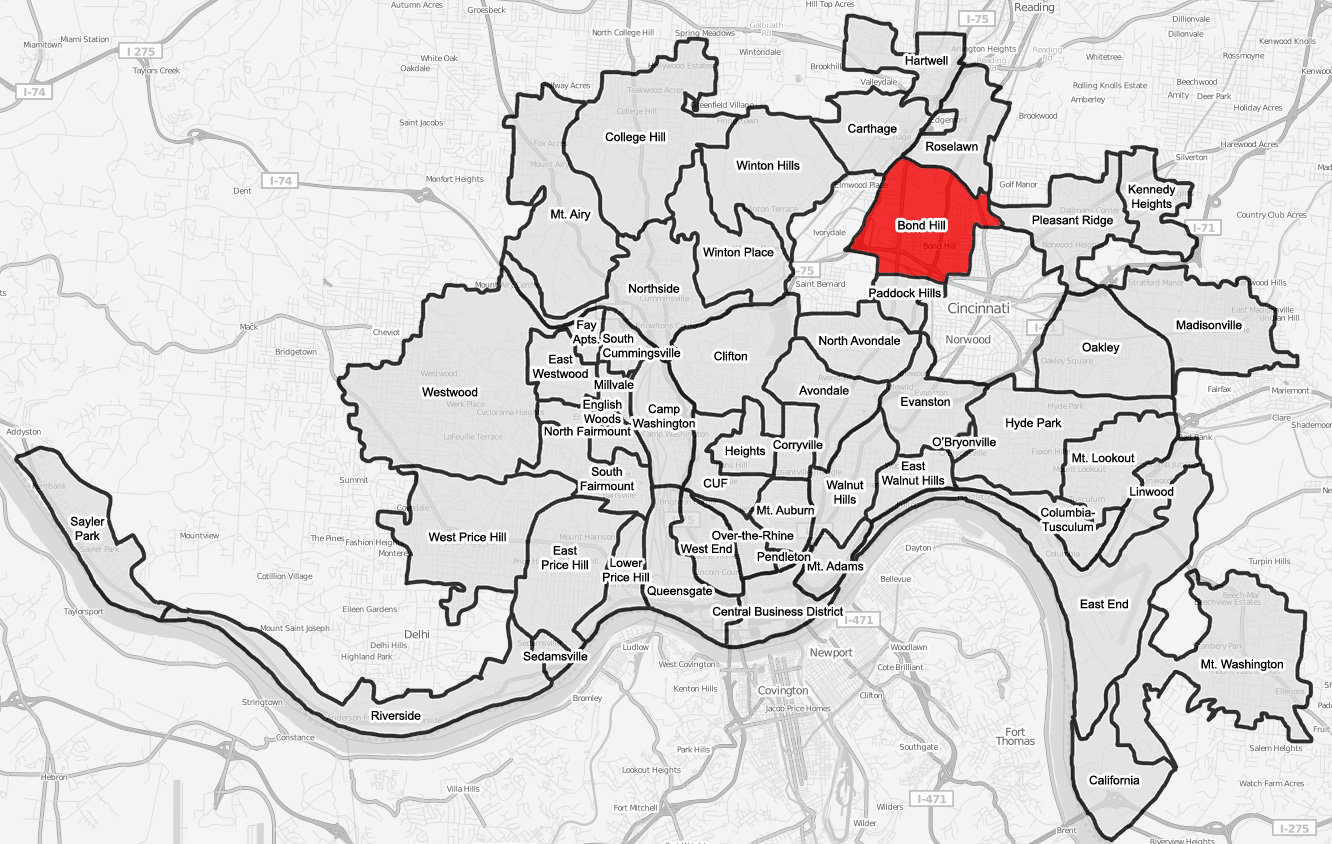
- Bond Hill (red) within Cincinnati, OH
- Coordinates: 39°10′29″N 84°28′02″W
- Country: United States
- State: Ohio
- County: Hamilton
- City: Cincinnati
- Founded: 1870

Population (2020)
  - Total: 7,002
- ZIP code: 45237

Bond Hill is one of the 52 neighborhoods of Cincinnati, Ohio. Founded as a railroad suburb and temperance community in 1870 in northeastern Millcreek Township, it is one of a number of neighborhoods lining the Mill Creek. The population was 7,002 at the 2020 census.

== History ==
=== Early history ===
Bond Hill began as a commuter suburb connected to Cincinnati via the Marietta-Cincinnati Railroad. It was founded by a cooperative building association, the Cooperative Land and Building Association No.1 of Hamilton County, Ohio, the first post-Civil War housing cooperative in Cincinnati and the first building association to be organized along ideological and not ethnic lines. The cooperative was organized in 1870 by five men including several teetotallers from nearby Cumminsville. The cooperative initially planned on building in Cumminsville but for unknown reasons, the co-op changed the site of their development to the area, which they renamed Bond Hill. The change was likely suggested by a founding member of the cooperative, Henry Watkin, an utopian socialist and expatriate English printer.

For at least 11 years after its founding in 1870, the sale of liquor was prohibited in Bond Hill according to the Constitution and By-Laws of the Cooperative. In the early 1880s, a disagreement centered on Bond Hill's church, considered by some to be non-denominational and by others to be Presbyterian, likely caused a schism within the early community and the cooperative. The role of Watkin and the early founders in the leadership of the community declined after the schism, and Bond Hill incorporated as the Village of Bond Hill in 1886.

The origin of the name Bond Hill remains something of a mystery. Newspaper articles documenting the founding and naming of the railroad suburb by the cooperative indicate that Bond Hill was the name of the area in the 1830s: "This was the name of that particular locality forty years ago, and carries with it associations not easily forgotten by the oldest inhabitants," (January 10, 1871, Cincinnati Daily Enquirer). An oral history transcribed in 1961 by George E. Patmor, one of the village's earliest residents, indicates that the name was first given by visitors to a sawmill operated by a man named Bond: "In these days the people of St. Bernard and Cincinnati would use a footpath through the woods 'for a shortcut from St. Bernard to Bond’s sawmill to work or transact business.' It got to be a common saying that they were going up on Bond Hill, so this is how we got the name 'Bond Hill'." Local historian, Aharon Varady, speculates that like other mills in upper Millcreek Township, Bond's Mill may have been a gathering site for gambling and traveling teamsters—associations which nearby residents may have wished to be forgotten.

=== Annexation and Development ===
The village was annexed by Cincinnati in 1903. Until the mid-1930s, Bond Hill was largely rural and surrounded by orchards and dairy farms. New parkways, such as Bloody Run (later Victory) Parkway, replaced the Miami-Erie Canal as the main route into and out of the neighborhood. As a result, residential and industrial developments replaced the agricultural zones. In the north, a regional high school, parking lot and shopping complex were built in the 1950s. Further development occurred in the 1960s due to the construction of the Interstate 75 Millcreek Expressway in western Bond Hill and the Norwood Lateral (State Route 562) extension in southern Bond Hill. Community residents opposed these developments but were largely ignored.

The environmental degradation and urbanization of the neighborhood presaged the exit of whites from Bond Hill in the 1960s and 1970s. Realtors and local banks actively encouraged the demographic transition of the neighborhood through redlining, blockbusting, and racial steering. The Bond Hill-Roselawn Community Council was founded in 1965 to combat this change. Throughout the next twenty years the Bond Hill Community Council attempted to develop a community plan and to halt white flight. Their achievements included the creation of a Bond Hill Community Master Plan in 1977 and the recognition of the "Old Bond Hill Village" Historic District in 1982.

In 2016, the 1977 Community Master Plan was superseded by the publication of the Bond Hill + Roselawn Community Plan, created by the Bond Hill + Roselawn Collaborative, which replaced the Bond Hill-Community Council. The BH+R Community Plan was finalized after two years of input from community volunteers and leaders, business owners, pastors and parishioners.

== Demographics ==
Population of Bond Hill 1900-2020
Year	Pop.	±%
1900	1,325	—
1910	1,925	+45.3%
1920	2,000	+3.9%
1930	4,923	+146.2%
1940	7,899	+60.5%
1950	9,178	+16.2%
1960	11,672	+27.2%
1970	12,324	+5.6%
1980	11,408	−7.4%
1990	10,822	−5.1%
2000	9,682	−10.5%
2010	6,972	−28.0%
2020	7,002	+0.4%

As of the census of 2020, there were 7,002 people living in the neighborhood. There were 3,581 housing units. The racial makeup of the neighborhood was 6.7% White, 87.0% Black or African American, 0.2% Native American, 0.6% Asian, 0.0% Pacific Islander, 1.4% from some other race, and 4.0% from two or more races. 3.1% of the population were Hispanic or Latino of any race.

There were 3,243 households, out of which 51.5% were families. 45.3% of all households were made up of individuals.

25.7% of the neighborhood's population were under the age of 18, 54.1% were 18 to 64, and 20.2% were 65 years of age or older. 48.6% of the population were male and 51.4% were female.

According to the U.S. Census American Community Survey, for the period 2016-2020 the estimated median annual income for a household in the neighborhood was $39,637. About 20.4% of family households were living below the poverty line. About 18.0% had a bachelor's degree or higher.

== The Bond Hill Bella Vista Historic District ==
On October 16, 2019, The Cincinnati City Council unanimously voted to designate The Bond Hill Bella Vista Historic District the city's 25th historic district. The Bond Hill Bella Vista Historic District runs east of Reading Road, for the entirety of Bella Vista Street, which is a one-block, no outlet road with all underground utilities. The Bond Hill Bella Vista Historic District is Cincinnati's first predominantly Tudor Revival historic district as well as its first predominantly 1920s–1930s historic district.
