= Riverside, Cincinnati =

Coordinates: 39°04′48″N 84°35′25″W

Riverside
- Neighborhood of Cincinnati
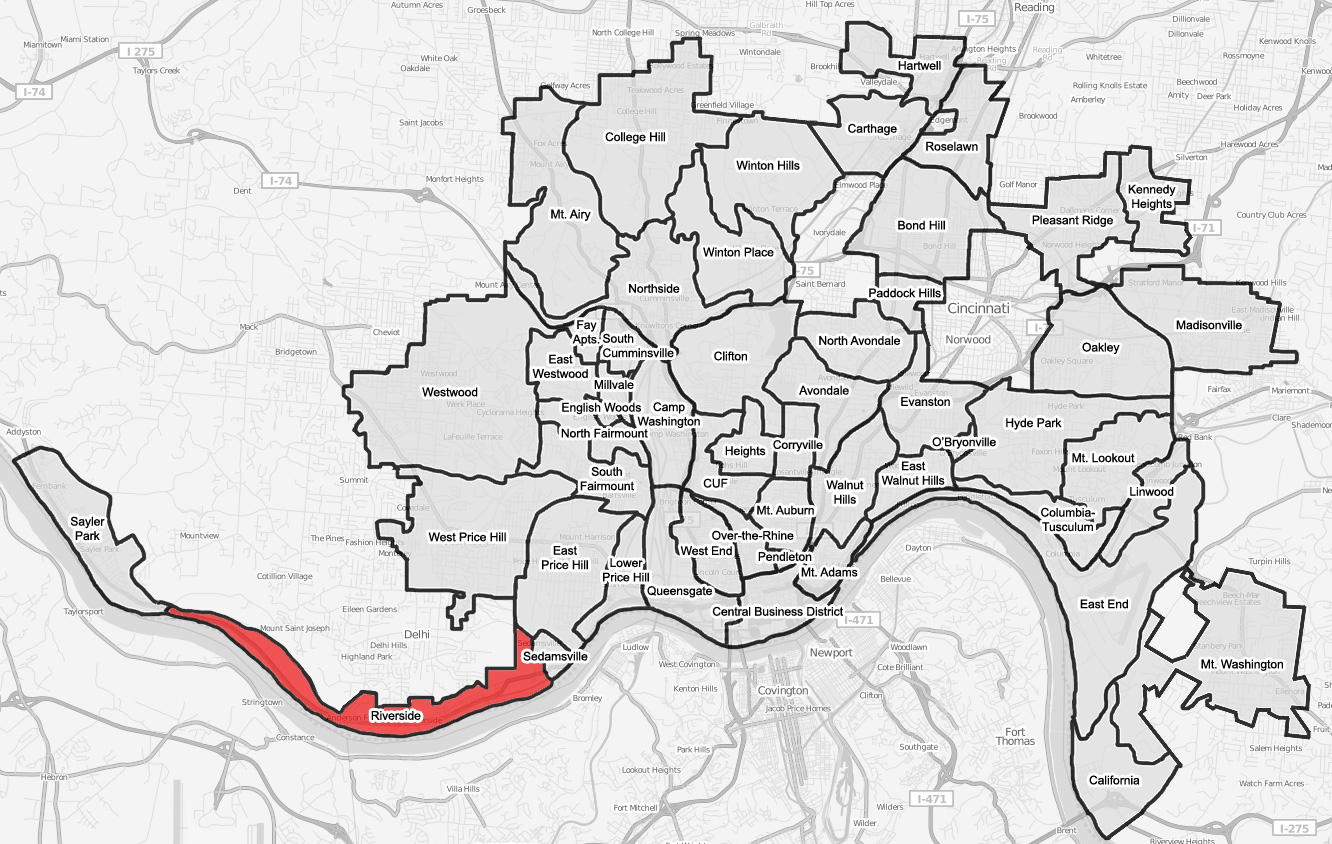
- Riverside (red) within Cincinnati, Ohio
- Country: United States
- State: Ohio
- County: Hamilton
- City: Cincinnati

Population (2020)
  - Total: 1,257

Riverside is one of the 52 neighborhoods of Cincinnati, Ohio. The neighborhood is contained in a narrow strip of land along the Ohio River on the city's west side, between Sayler Park and Sedamsville. Predominantly industrial, the neighborhood has few residential areas, with a population of 1,257 at the 2020 census.

== History ==
Riverside incorporated as a village on August 20, 1867, covering 833 acres (337 ha): 509 acres (206 ha) in Delhi Township and 124 acres (50 ha) in Storrs Township. Peter Zinn was the village's first mayor. The village was annexed by the City of Cincinnati in 1896.

== Demographics ==
As of the census of 2020, there were 1,257 people living in the neighborhood. There were 672 housing units. The racial makeup of the neighborhood was 74.5% White, 14.6% Black or African American, 0.2% Native American, 1.8% Asian, 0.0% Pacific Islander, 1.6% from some other race, and 7.3% from two or more races. 3.6% of the population were Hispanic or Latino of any race.

There were 506 households, out of which 42.1% were families. 52.4% of all households were made up of individuals.

5.5% of the neighborhood's population were under the age of 18, 79.4% were 18 to 64, and 15.1% were 65 years of age or older. 53.7% of the population were male and 46.3% were female.

According to the U.S. Census American Community Survey, for the period 2016-2020 the estimated median annual income for a household in the neighborhood was $45,714. About 0.9% of family households were living below the poverty line. About 20.4% of adults had a bachelor's degree or higher.

== Infrastructure ==
U.S. Route 50 runs directly through all of Riverside. It also has railroad tracks going through and is the main way trains get from the west to Cincinnati. Riverside is also home to the historic Anderson Ferry that was established in 1817. Anderson Ferry is the only ferry in the county.

== Notable people ==
- Laurence Halstead, US Army brigadier general
- Pete Rose, Major League Baseball player
