= Sedamsville, Cincinnati =

Coordinates: 39°05′26″N 84°34′15″W

Sedamsville
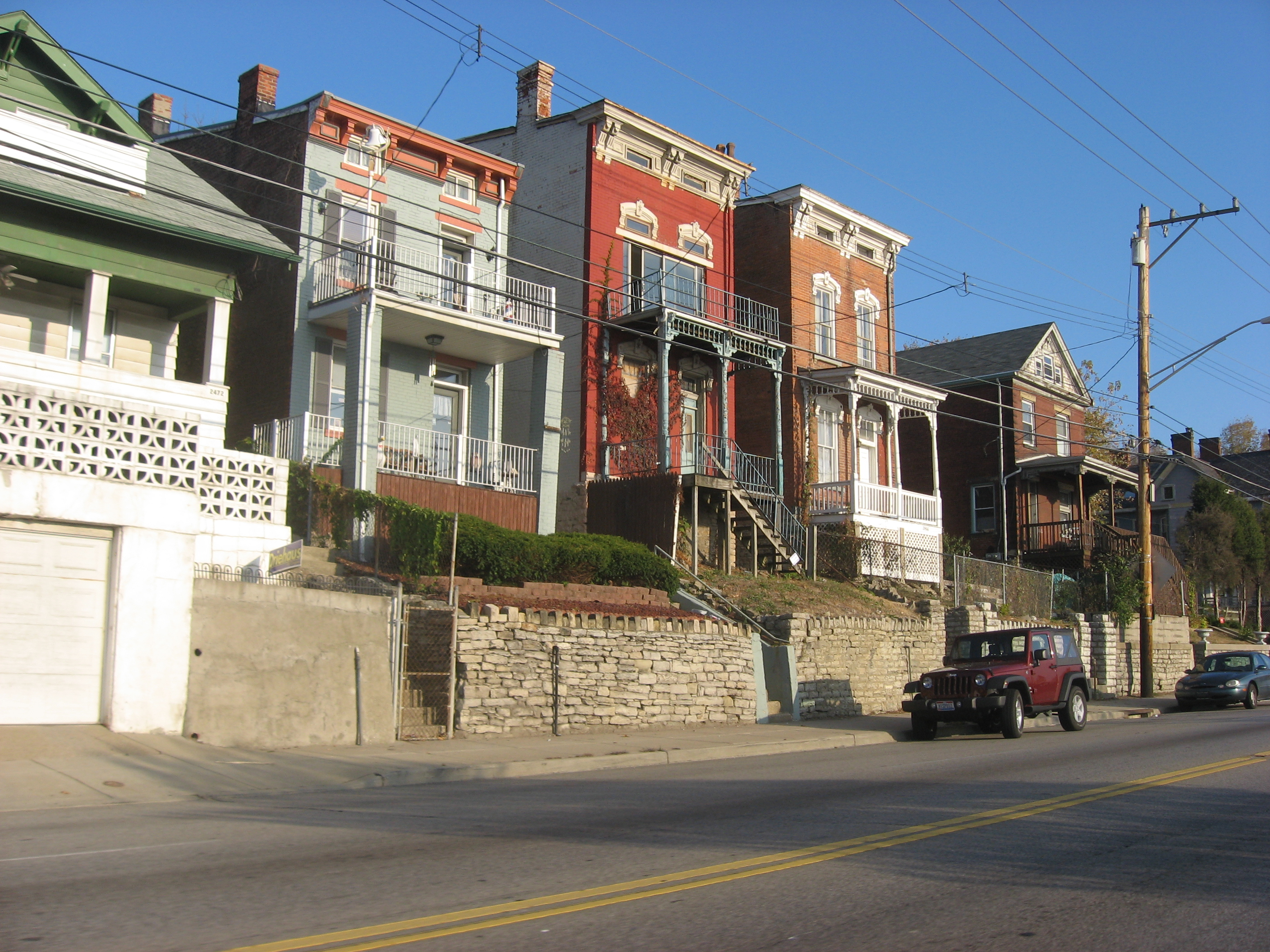
- Houses on River Road in Sedamsville

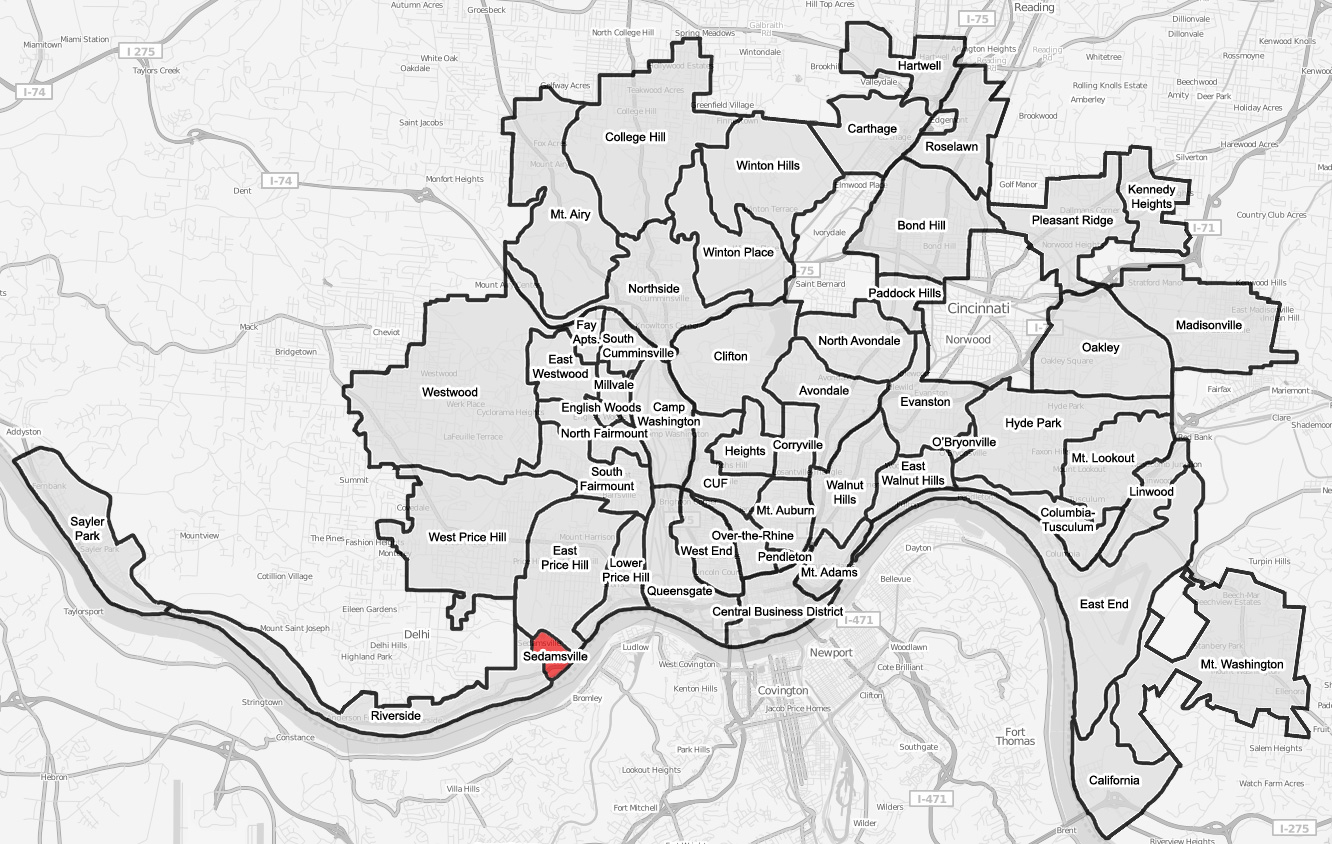
- Sedamsville is a neighborhood of Cincinnati, Ohio
- Country: United States
- State: Ohio
- City: Cincinnati

Population (2020)
  - Total: 1,256

Sedamsville (/səˈdæmzvɪl/ sə-DAMZ-vil) is one of the 52 neighborhoods of Cincinnati, Ohio. Established in 1795 and annexed in 1870, the neighborhood lies along the Ohio River in the western part of the city. The population was 1,256 at the 2020 census.

== History ==
Sedamsville was established in 1795 by Colonel Cornelius Sedam, a veteran of the Revolutionary War, who moved to the area to assist in the building of Fort Washington. The neighborhood was also home to one of the first Fleischmann's Yeast factories in the US and was founded by Louis Fleischmann, his brother Maximilian, and James Gaff. In 1835, Sedamsville incorporated as a village in the newly organized Storrs Township. Cincinnati annexed the township, including Sedamsville, in 1870.

The Industrial Revolution changed the landscape bringing commerce and large factories to the area along with a new influx of residents. Unfortunately the Great Depression saw many of those businesses close their doors, and then the disastrous flood of 1937 made it impossible for many to rebuild. Many more buildings were destroyed with the widening of River Road in the 1940s which nearly wiped out the business district completely. The neighborhood further declined in the late 20th and early 21st century due to negligent landlords owning several of the area's buildings.

With help from the Cincinnati Preservation Association, many historic buildings have been saved from demolition. Nearly the whole neighborhood is now listed on the National Register of Historical Places.

== Demographics ==
Population of Sedamsville 1900-2020
Year	Pop.	±%
1900	3,418	—
1910	4,341	+27.0%
1920	3,975	−8.4%
1930	4,368	+9.9%
1940	4,234	−3.1%
1950	3,897	−8.0%
1960	3,777	−3.1%
1970	3,922	+3.8%
1980	3,007	−23.3%
1990	2,639	−12.2%
2000	2,223	−15.8%
2010	680	−69.4%
2020	1,256	+84.7%
Before 2010 Sedamsville had parts of the Riverside neighborhood included in its census tract.

As of the census of 2020, there were 1,256 people living in the neighborhood. There were 638 housing units. The racial makeup of the neighborhood was 69.3% White, 20.5% Black or African American, 0.3% Native American, 0.5% Asian, 0.6% Pacific Islander, 1.8% from some other race, and 7.1% from two or more races. 2.5% of the population were Hispanic or Latino of any race.

There were 674 households, out of which 62.8% were families. About 27.7% of all households were made up of individuals.

20.7% of the neighborhood's population were under the age of 18, 65.3% were 18 to 64, and 14.0% were 65 years of age or older. 50.3% of the population were male and 49.7% were female.

According to the U.S. Census American Community Survey, for the period 2016-2020 the estimated median annual income for a household in the neighborhood was $45,568. About 20.6% of family households were living below the poverty line. About 7.3% of adults had a bachelor's degree or higher.
