= Spring Grove Village, Cincinnati =

Coordinates: 39°10′N 84°31′W

Spring Grove Village
- Neighborhood of Cincinnati
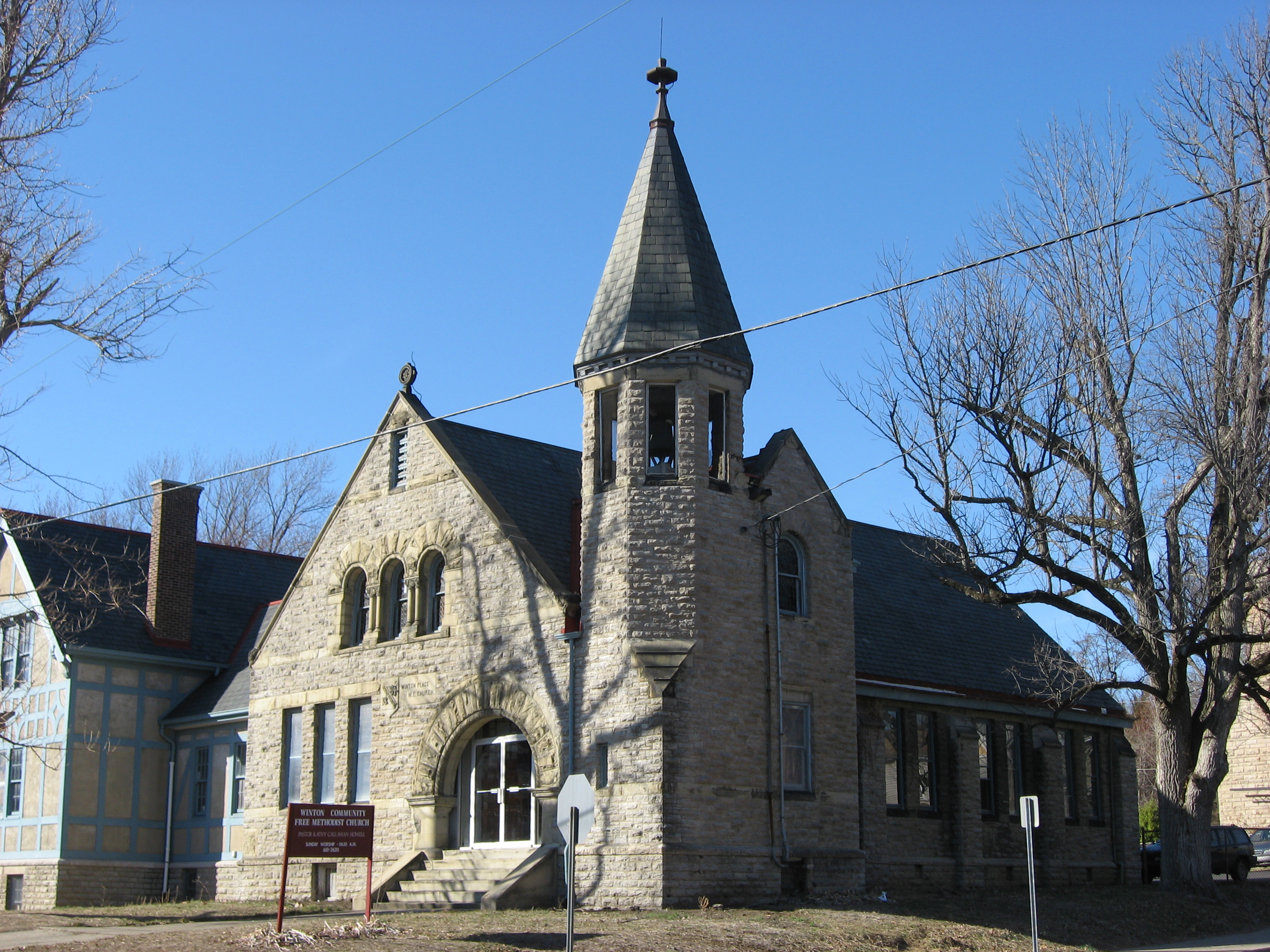
- Winton Place Methodist Episcopal Church

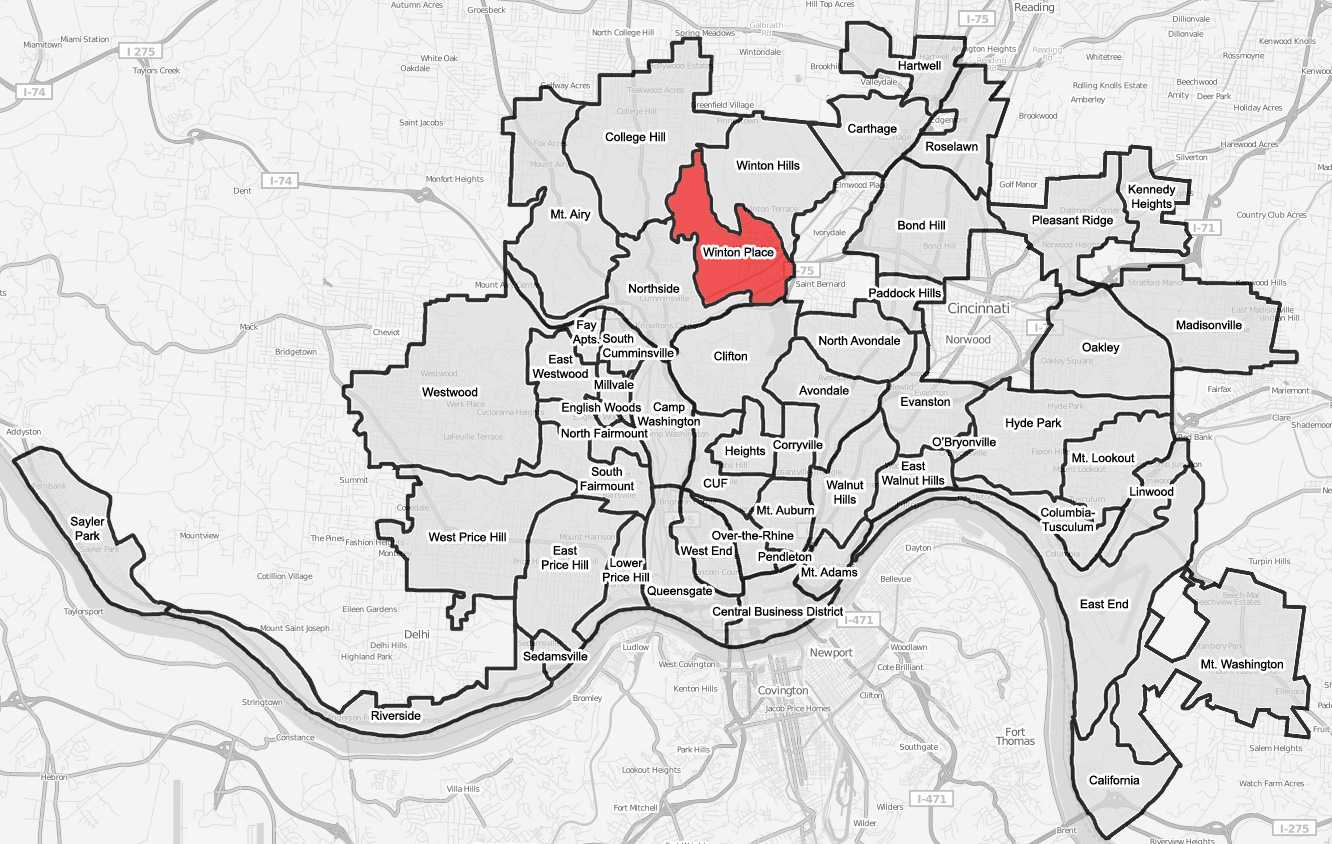
- Spring Grove Village (red) within Cincinnati, Ohio
- Country: United States
- State: Ohio
- County: Hamilton
- City: Cincinnati

Population (2020)
  - Total: 1,916

Spring Grove Village is one of the 52 neighborhoods of Cincinnati, Ohio. Annexed in 1903, the neighborhood was known as Winton Place until 2007. It is located off Interstate 75 in the Mill Creek Valley. The population was 1,916 at the 2020 census.

== History ==
Historically known as both The Mill Creek Township Farm and Spring Grove, this canal and railroad town was incorporated in 1882, then annexed to the city of Cincinnati in November 1903.

Railroad lines to the north from Cincinnati Union Terminal passed through the Winton Place station.

For many years the neighborhood was known as Winton Place. In early 2007, the residents of Winton Place voted to change the name to Spring Grove Village. The neighborhood's community council attributed the name change to a desire to distinguish the neighborhood from nearby locations with similar names, such as Winton Woods, as well as to reflect the presence of Spring Grove Cemetery within the community.

== Geography ==
Spring Grove Village is bordered by the neighborhoods of Clifton, Northside, College Hill, and Winton Hills, and the city of St. Bernard.

== Demographics ==
As of the census of 2020, there were 1,916 people living in the neighborhood. There were 984 housing units. The racial makeup of the neighborhood was 37.3% White, 50.1% Black or African American, 0.4% Native American, 1.3% Asian, 0.1% Pacific Islander, 4.3% from some other race, and 6.7% from two or more races. 5.8% of the population were Hispanic or Latino of any race.

There were 889 households, out of which 57.4% were families. About 36.0% of all households were made up of individuals.

33.7% of the neighborhood's population were under the age of 18, 53.1% were 18 to 64, and 13.2% were 65 years of age or older. 47.9% of the population were male and 52.1% were female.

According to the U.S. Census American Community Survey, for the period 2016-2020 the estimated median annual income for a household in the neighborhood was $36,964. About 14.1% of family households were living below the poverty line. About 23.8% of adults had a bachelor's degree or higher.
