= Rapid Run (Ohio River tributary) =

Coordinates: 39°05′58″N 84°40′17″W

Rapid Run is a stream located entirely within Hamilton County, Ohio. The 4.7-mile (7.6 km) long stream is a tributary of the Ohio River.

Rapid Run was so named on account of its relatively steep stream gradient.

== See also ==
- List of rivers of Ohio
