= Preble County District Library =

Coordinates: 39°44′20″N 84°38′09″W

- Preble County District Library: Helping You Connect to the World Preble County District Library: Helping You Connect to the World
- Location: 450 S. Barron Street
- Type: Public library
- Established: December 15, 1959
- Branches: 7 branches + administration/genealogy

Access and use
- Circulation: 244,198 (2016)
- Members: 29,202 (2016)

Other information
- Budget: $1,912,187.74 (2016)
- Director: Lauren Robinson
- Website: preblelibrary.org

Preble County District Library (PCDL) is a multi-branch library system that serves the various cities and villages of Preble County, Ohio. It has seven branches across the Preble County, along with the Library Administration and Resource Center and the Preble County Room (local history and genealogy), both located at 450 S. Barron Street in Eaton.

The Library Administration and Resource Center hours are Monday through Friday, 8:00 a.m. – 5:00 p.m.

The main library branch, located in downtown Eaton, is open Monday through Thursday, 9:00 a.m. – 8:00 p.m., and Friday through Saturday, 9:00 a.m. – 5:00 p.m.

The hours at the other branches vary according to location.

== History ==
The Preble County District Library was formed in 1959 with the consolidation of six small, independent libraries (located in Camden, Eaton, Eldorado, New Paris, West Elkton, and West Alexandria). That year, the Campbellstown Library closed and turned their holdings over to the newly formed system. In 1961, a library was created in West Manchester; it joined PCDL later in the year. In February 1996, the library administration and the genealogy department moved from the Eaton branch into a new building (the former Traditions Restaurant) on the south end of Eaton.

== Locations and hours ==
=== Library Administration and Resource Center ===
450 S. Barron Street
Eaton, Ohio 45320

Monday-Friday: 8-5

=== Camden Branch Library ===
104 S. Main Street
Camden, Ohio 45311

Monday: 12-8
Tuesday: 2-8
Wednesday: 12-8
Thursday: 12-8
Friday: 10-2
Saturday: 10-2

=== Eaton Branch Library ===
301 N. Barron St.
Eaton, OH 45320

Monday-Thursday: 9-8
Friday-Saturday: 9-5

=== Eldorado Branch Library ===
150 N. Main St.
Eldorado, Ohio 45321

Tuesday: 12-6
Thursday: 12-6
Saturday: 1-4

=== New Paris Branch Library ===
115 N. Washington Street
New Paris, OH 45347

Monday-Wednesday: 2-8
Friday: 10-4
Saturday: 10-2

=== Preble County Room (Genealogy) ===
450 S. Barron Street
Eaton, Ohio 45320

Tuesday-Thursday: 9-5
Friday: 9-3
1st and 3rd Saturdays: 9-5

=== West Alexandria Branch Library ===
16 N. Main Street
Town Hall
West Alexandria, Ohio 45381

Monday, Wednesday: 12-7
Tuesday: 1-7
Friday: 12-4
Saturday: 10-2

=== West Elkton Branch Library ===
135 N. Main St.
Town Hall
West Elkton, Ohio, 45070

Monday, Wednesday: 1-6
Thursday: 1-6

=== West Manchester Branch Library ===
212 S. High Street
West Manchester, Ohio 45382

Monday: 12-6
Wednesday: 12-6
Saturday: 9:30-12:30
