= New Hope, Preble County, Ohio =

New Hope, Ohio
- Unincorporated community
- Location within Ohio Location within the United States
- Coordinates: 39°47′30″N 84°42′48″W
- Country: United States
- State: Ohio
- County: Preble
- Elevation: 1,152 ft (351 m)
- Time zone: UTC-5 (Eastern (EST))
  - Summer (DST): UTC-4 (EDT)
- Area codes: 937, 326
- GNIS feature ID: 1065120

New Hope is an unincorporated community in eastern Jackson Township, Preble County, Ohio, United States. It is located along U.S. Route 35 approximately 2.5 miles (4 km) east of Campbellstown and 5 miles (8 km) northwest of Eaton. The community is part of the Dayton Metropolitan Statistical Area. The community is served by National Trail High School and the National Trail Local School District.

== History ==
New Hope was laid out in 1841. The post office in the community was called Upshur. This post office was established in 1844, and remained in operation until 1906.
