= Cedar Springs =

Cedar Springs and Cedar Spring may refer to:

== United States ==
- Cedar Springs, Arizona
- Cedar Spring, Kentucky
- Cedar Springs, Georgia
- Cedar Springs, Michigan
- Cedar Springs, Missouri
- Cedar Springs, Ohio
- Cedar Springs, Oklahoma, in Major County on U.S. Route 60 southwest of Fairview
- Cedar Springs, Texas
- Cedar Springs Historic District, South Carolina

== Canada ==
- Cedar Springs, Chatham-Kent, Ontario
- Cedar Springs, Halton Regional Municipality, Ontario

== Other uses ==
- Battle of Cedar Springs, Spartanburg County, South Carolina
