= Monroe Township, Preble County, Ohio =

Township in Ohio, US

- Township
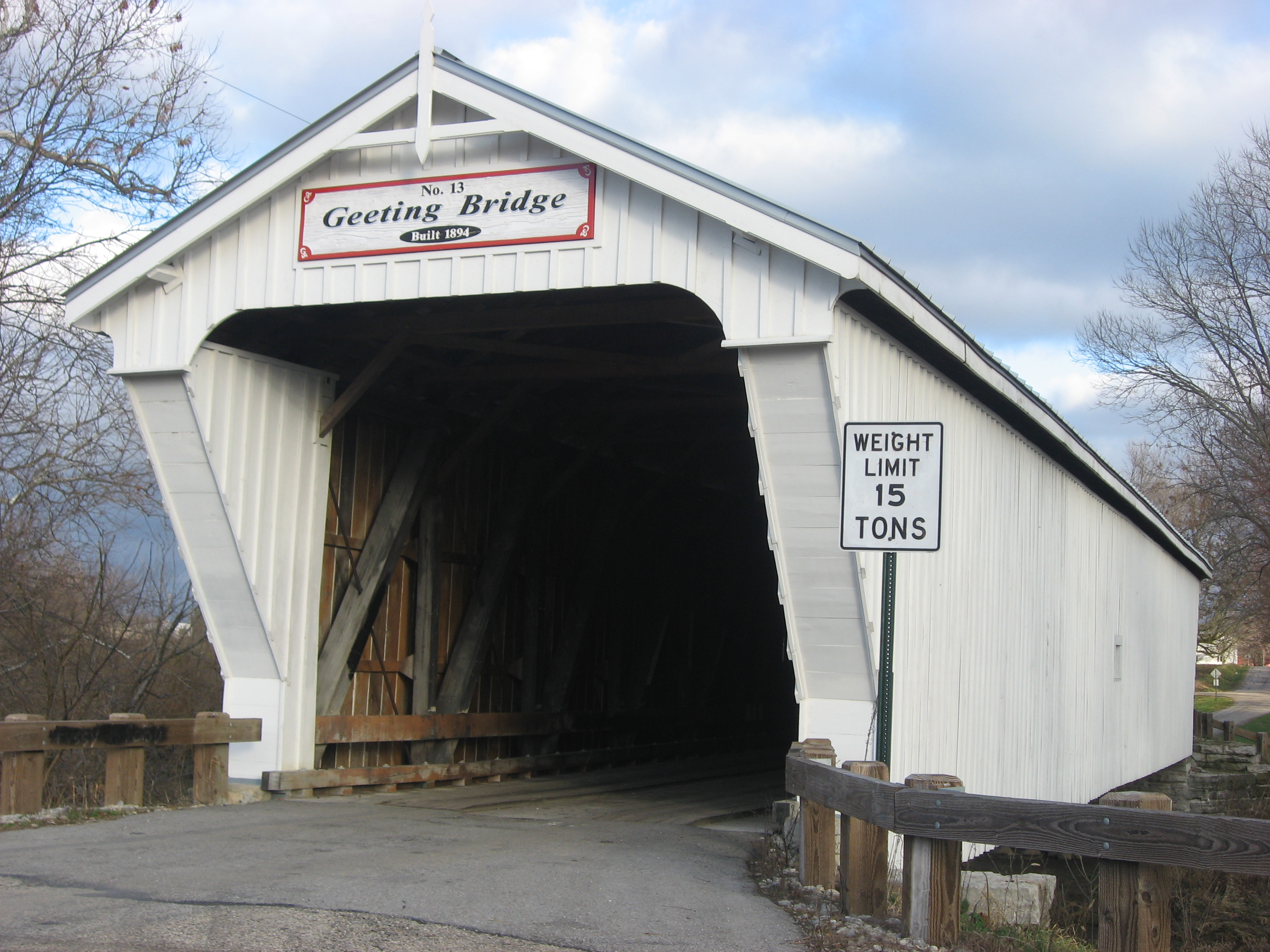
- Geeting Covered Bridge, a historic site in the township

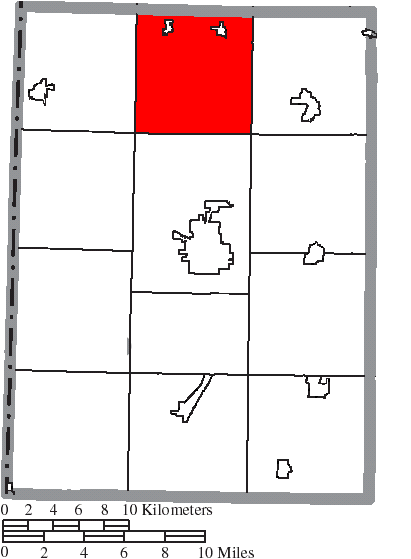
- Location of Monroe Township in Preble County
- Coordinates: 39°53′5″N 84°39′27″W
- Country: United States
- State: Ohio
- County: Preble

Area
  - Total: 35.2 sq mi (91.2 km^{2})
  - Land: 35.2 sq mi (91.2 km^{2})
  - Water: 0 sq mi (0.0 km^{2})
- Elevation: 1,109 ft (338 m)

Population (2020)
  - Total: 2,084
  - Density: 59.2/sq mi (22.9/km^{2})
- Time zone: UTC-5 (Eastern (EST))
  - Summer (DST): UTC-4 (EDT)
- FIPS code: 39-51548
- GNIS feature ID: 1086853

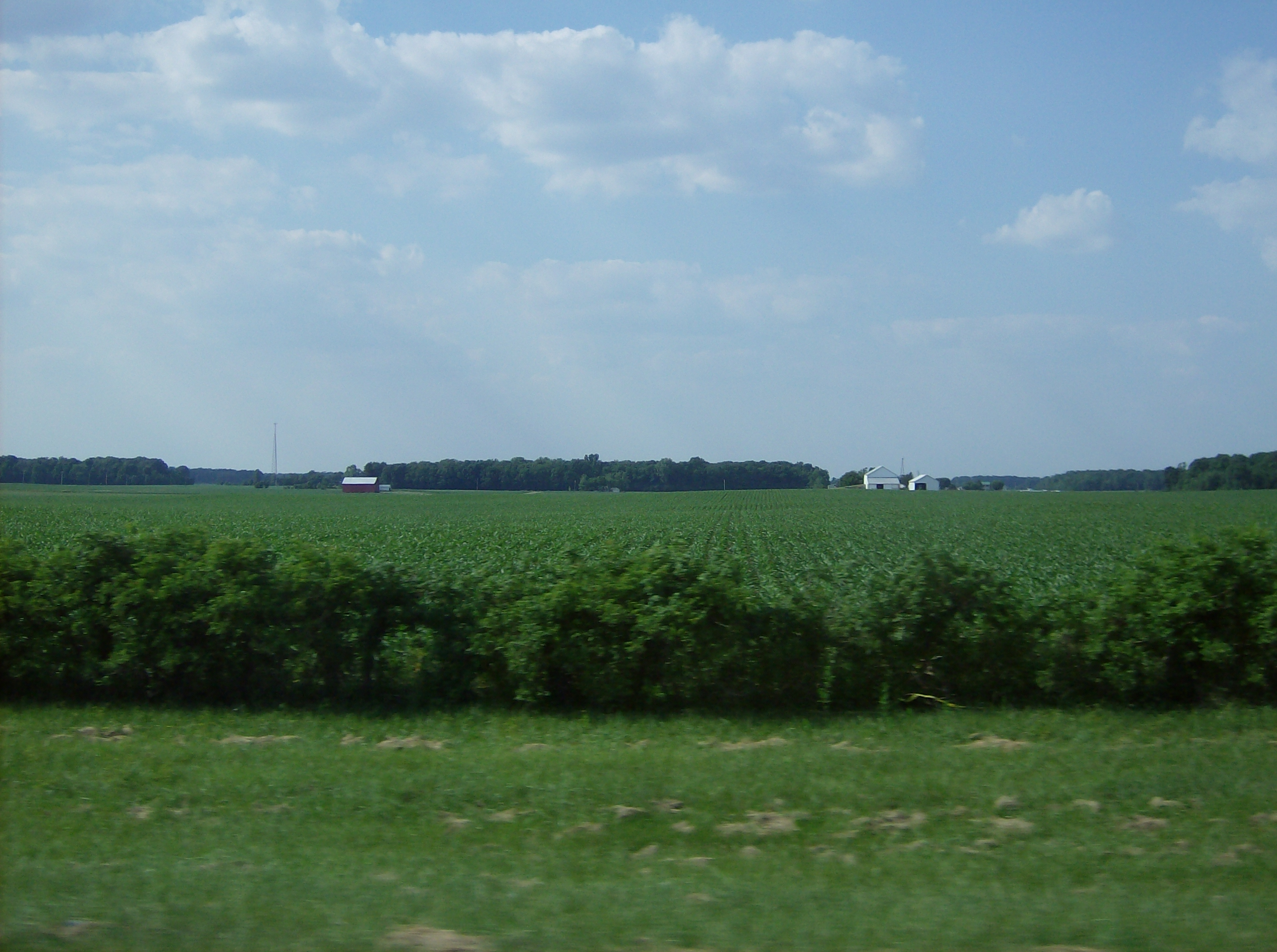
Countryside in Monroe Township

Monroe Township is one of the twelve townships of Preble County, Ohio, United States. The 2020 census found 2,084 people in the township. The Monroe community is served by National Trail High School and the National Trail Local School District. Interstate 70 runs along the southern part of the township and has a major interchange at U.S. Route 127.

== Geography ==
Located in the northern part of the county, it borders the following townships:

- Butler Township, Darke County - north
- Twin Township, Darke County - northeast corner
- Harrison Township - east
- Twin Township - southeast corner
- Washington Township - south
- Jackson Township - southwest corner
- Jefferson Township - west
- Harrison Township, Darke County - northwest corner

Two incorporated villages are located in Monroe Township: Eldorado in the northwest, and West Manchester in the northeast. Two major U.S highways intersect within the township. U.S. Route 40 runs east and west, while U.S. Route 127 runs north and south.

== Name and history ==
Monroe Township was established in 1817. It is one of twenty-two Monroe Townships statewide.

== Government ==
The township is governed by a three-member board of trustees, who are elected in November of odd-numbered years to a four-year term beginning on the following January 1. Two are elected in the year after the presidential election and one is elected in the year before it. There is also an elected township fiscal officer, who serves a four-year term beginning on April 1 of the year after the election, which is held in November of the year before the presidential election. Vacancies in the fiscal officership or on the board of trustees are filled by the remaining trustees.
