= Sugar Valley =

Sugar Valley may refer to a place in the United States:

- Sugar Valley, Georgia
- Sugar Valley, Ohio
- Sugar Valley, Pennsylvania
- Sugar Valley, Pleasants County, West Virginia
- Sugar Valley, Preston County, West Virginia
- Sugar Valley Airport, North Carolina
