= Brinley =

Brinley is a given name and a surname meaning 'burned clearing’. Notable people with the name include:

== Given name ==
- Brinley Rees (1919–2004), Welsh academic
- Brinley Richards (1904–1981), Welsh language poet, author, Archdruid of the National Eisteddfod of Wales 1972–1975
- Brinley D. Sleight (1835–1913), American newspaper editor and politician
- Brinley Williams (1895–1987), Welsh dual-code international rugby wing
- Henry Brinley Richards (1817–1885), Welsh composer

== Surname ==
- Acacia Brinley (born 1997), American influencer
- Bertrand R. Brinley (1917–1994), American writer of short stories and children's tales
- Charles Brinley (1880–1946), American actor of the silent era
- D. Putnam Brinley (1879–1963), American artist of the modernist school
- Godfrey Brinley (1864–1939), tennis player from the United States

== See also ==
- Brinley, Ohio
- Brynlee (given name)
