= Ebenezer, Ohio =

Unincorporated community in Ohio, U.S.

Coordinates: 39°50′32″N 84°41′49″W

Ebenezer is an unincorporated community in Preble County, in the U.S. state of Ohio.

== History ==
A post office called Ebenezer was established in 1866, and remained in operation until 1902. The Ebenezer post office once served nearby Gettysburg as well.
