= Campbellstown, Ohio =

- Unincorporated community
- Location within Ohio Location within the United States
- Coordinates: 39°47′16″N 84°45′37″W
- Country: United States
- State: Ohio
- County: Preble
- Elevation: 1,188 ft (362 m)
- Time zone: UTC-5 (Eastern (EST))
  - Summer (DST): UTC-4 (EDT)
- Area codes: 937, 326
- GNIS feature ID: 1056762

Campbellstown (also Florence, Florence Station) is an unincorporated community in Jackson Township, Preble County, Ohio United States. The community is served by National Trail High School and the National Trail Local School District.

== History ==
Campbellstown was originally called Florence Station, and under the latter name was laid out in 1852 when the railroad was extended to that point. The present name honors a pioneer settler with the surname Campbell. A post office called Campbellstown was established in 1854, and remained in operation until 1954.

== Notable person ==
- Don Elston, baseball player, was born and grew up in Campbellstown.
