= Hagerstown, Ohio =

Coordinates: 39.909576°N 84.607114°W

Hagerstown is an extinct town in Preble County, in the U.S. state of Ohio.

== History ==
A post office was established at Hagerstown in 1832, and remained in operation until 1855. With the construction of the railroad, business activity shifted to nearby West Manchester, and the town's population dwindled.
