= Hagerstown (disambiguation) =

Hagerstown is a city in the U.S. state of Maryland.

Hagerstown may also refer to:

- Hagerstown, Indiana
- Hagerstown Metropolitan Area
- Hagerstown, Ohio
