= West Manchester =

West Manchester may refer to:

- West Manchester, Ohio
- West Manchester Township, York County, Pennsylvania
- West Manchester F.C., former association football club from Manchester, England
- Salford, a city located directly west of Manchester
