= Hamburg, Preble County, Ohio =

Unincorporated community in Ohio, U.S.

Coordinates: 39°53′14″N 84°40′35″W

Hamburg is an unincorporated community in Preble County, in the U.S. state of Ohio.

== History ==
Hamburg was laid out and platted in 1850. A post office called Hamburgh was established in 1850, and remained in operation until 1854. With the construction of the railroad, business activity shifted to nearby Eldorado, and the town's population dwindled.
