= Llamageddon =

2015 American film

Llamageddon is a 2015 American science fiction comedy horror film, directed by Howie Dewin.

== Synopsis ==
In Preble County, Ohio, a llama lands on Earth from outer space, after which it kills the attendees of a college house party. Its intro scene is animated.

== Cast ==
- Dany Ambassa
- Gooch Jesco III
- James Earl Cox III
- Louie The Llama
- Pinki Brainweis

== Release and reception ==
Llamageddon began as a student film project for Miami University. After their graduation, they gathered a group of between 25 and 30 people to film it. The film was produced on a $3000 budget, and member of the production stated that many of the scenes were shot unscripted. The cast credited themselves under pseudonyms. It was screened at the Esquire Theater, in Cincinnati.

A trailer was released in 2015. It received a limited release on April 20, 2015, then in 2018, Llamageddon released onto Amazon Prime Video for rental. The film costed $999,999.99 to rent in standard-definition and $1,000,000.99 to rent in high-definition. The cost to rent was later lowered to $2.99.

Bat, a reviewer for Cult Horror Films, gave Llamageddon 4/5 stars, saying it is "too brilliant to be put into words". A review from Movies & Mania rated it 2.5/5 stars.

In 2023, a trailer for a spiritual successor, Alpacalypse, was released, with the film releasing onto Amazon Prime in December 2024.
