= Dayton metropolitan area =

Metro Dayton
- Metropolitan Statistical Area
- Dayton–Springfield–Kettering, OH; Combined Statistical Area
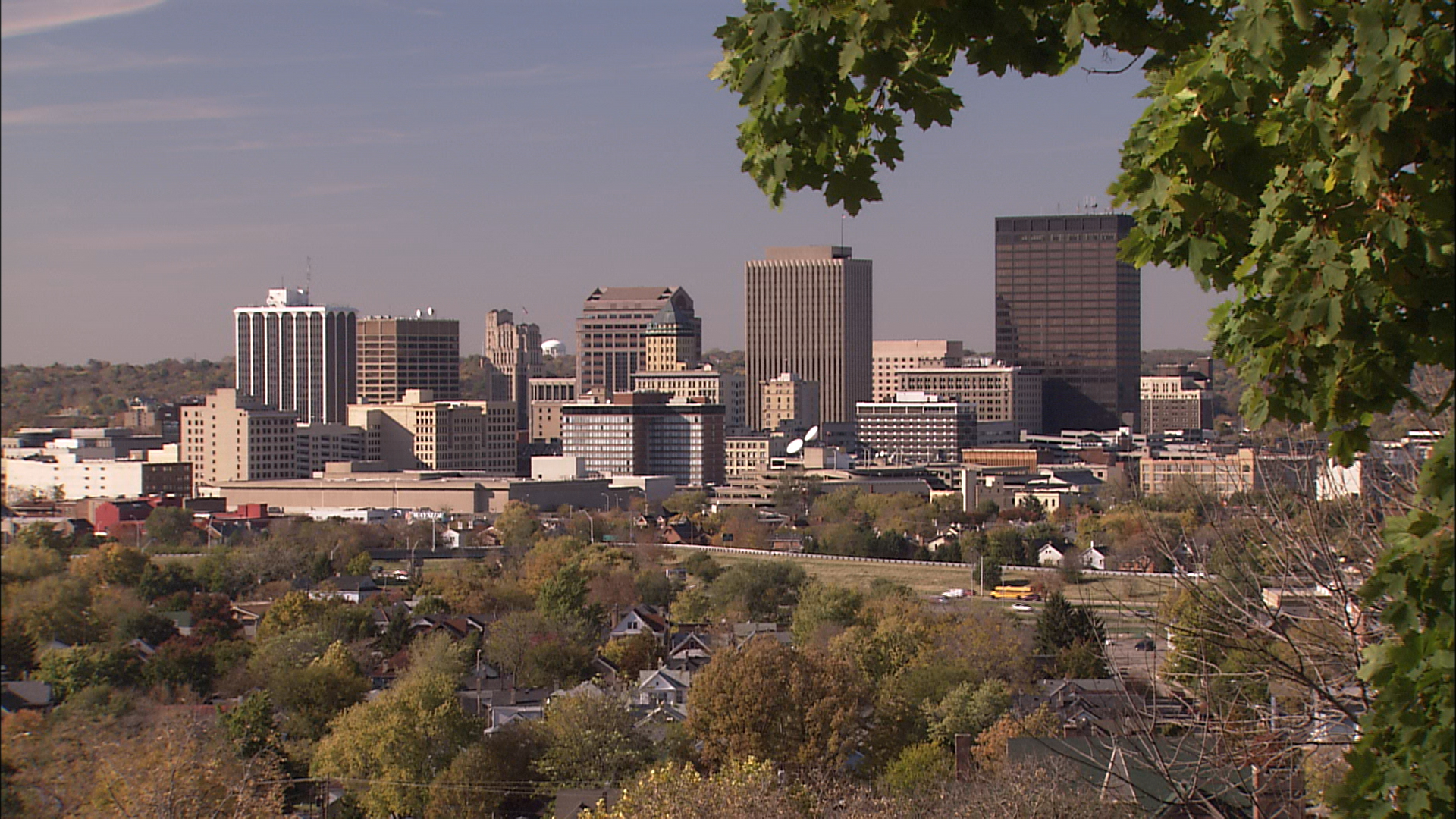
- City of Dayton skyline from Woodland Cemetery and Arboretum
Map of Dayton–Springfield–Kettering, OH CSA
City of Dayton
Dayton–Kettering–Beavercreek MSA
Springfield MSA
Greenville µSA
Sidney µSA
Urbana µSA
- Coordinates: 39°49′46″N 84°08′31″W
- Country: United States
- State: Ohio
- Largest city: Dayton
- Other cities (Suburbs): Kettering; Beavercreek; Huber Heights; Fairborn; Centerville; Miamisburg; West Carrollton

Area
  - Total: 1,715 sq mi (4,440 km^{2})

Population (2020)
  - Total: 814,049
  - Rank: 73rd in the U.S.
  - Density: 480/sq mi (185/km^{2})

GDP
  - MSA: $41.111 billion (2022)
- Time zone: UTC−05:00 (Eastern Standard Time)
  - Summer (DST): UTC−04:00 (Eastern Daylight Time)

Metro Dayton or the Miami Valley, or more formally the Dayton–Kettering–Beavercreek, OH Metropolitan Statistical Area, as defined by the United States Census Bureau, is an area consisting of three counties in the Miami Valley region of Ohio and is anchored by the city of Dayton. As of 2020, it is the fourth-largest metropolitan area in Ohio and the 72nd-largest metropolitan area by population in the United States.

== Counties ==
- Greene
- Miami
- Montgomery

== Cities ==
=== Places with more than 100,000 inhabitants ===
- Dayton (principal city) – 135,944

=== Places with 25,000 to 100,000 inhabitants ===
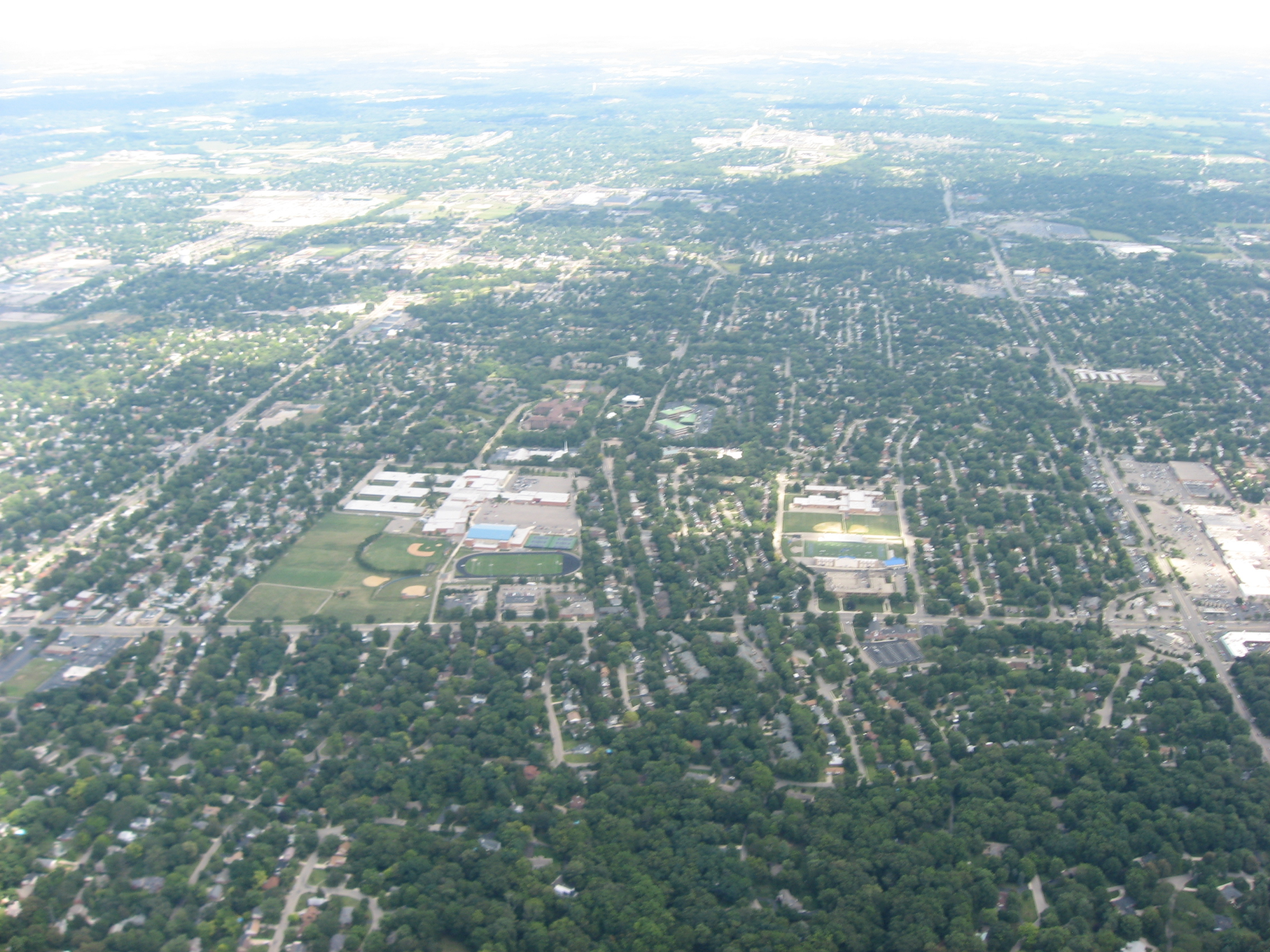
Kettering is the second largest city in Greater Dayton, and its largest suburb.

- Kettering – 57,862
- Beavercreek – 46,636
- Huber Heights – 43,439
- Fairborn – 34,977
- Troy – 26,432
- Xenia – 25,463
- Riverside – 24,350

=== Places with 10,000 to 25,000 inhabitants ===
- Centerville – 24,240
- Trotwood – 22,968
- Piqua – 20,442
- Miamisburg – 19,790
- Springboro – 19,263
- Vandalia – 15,090
- Englewood – 13,396
- Clayton – 13,310
- West Carrollton – 13,012
- Tipp City – 10,331
- Sidney - 20,421

=== Places with 5,000 to 10,000 inhabitants ===
- Oakwood – 8,936
- Bellbrook – 7,344
- Union – 6,891
- Moraine – 6,470
- Brookville – 5,874
- Germantown – 5,519
- Carlisle – 5,446

=== Places with 1,000 to 5,000 inhabitants ===
- West Milton – 4,828
- Cedarville – 4,320
- New Lebanon – 3,984
- Yellow Springs – 3,744
- Covington – 2,708
- Wilberforce – 2,271
- Shawnee Hills – 2,171
- Jamestown – 2,136
- Drexel – 2,076
- Bradford – 1,866
- Pleasant Hill – 1,254

=== Places with fewer than 1,000 inhabitants ===
- Bowersville
- Casstown
- Clifton (partial)
- College Corner (partial)
- Eldorado
- Farmersville
- Fletcher
- Gratis
- Laura
- Ludlow Falls
- Phillipsburg
- Potsdam
- Spring Valley
- Verona
- West Elkton
- West Manchester

=== Unincorporated places ===
- Brandt
- Byron
- Chautauqua (partial)
- Conover
- Fairhaven
- Fort McKinley
- Morning Sun
- New Hope
- Northridge
- Phoneton
- Pyrmont
- Shiloh
- West Charleston
- Woodbourne-Hyde Park

== Townships ==
=== Greene County ===
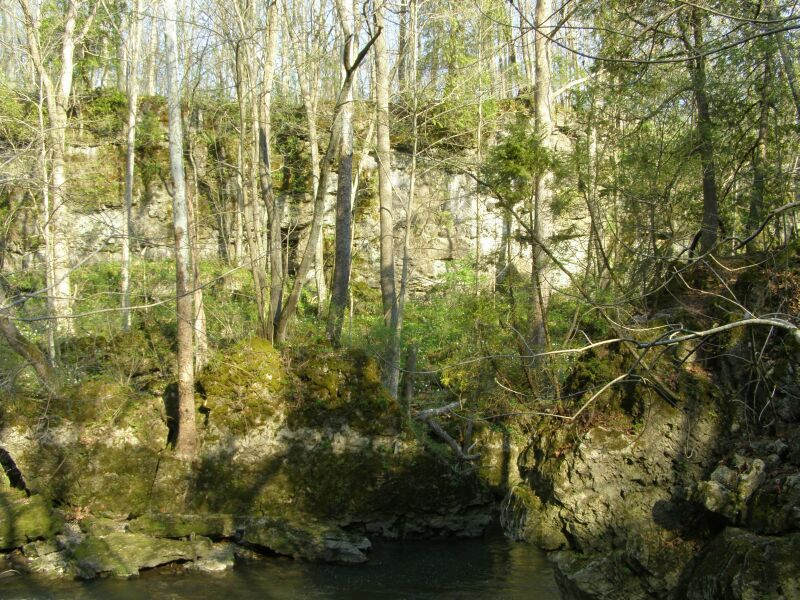
Clifton Gorge in John Bryan State Park, near Yellow Springs.

- Bath Township
- Beavercreek Township
- Caesarscreek Township
- Cedarville Township
- Jefferson Township
- Miami Township
- New Jasper Township
- Ross Township
- Silvercreek Township
- Spring Valley Township
- Sugarcreek Township
- Xenia Township

=== Miami County ===
- Bethel Township
- Brown Township
- Concord Township
- Elizabeth Township
- Lostcreek Township
- Monroe Township
- Newberry Township
- Newton Township
- Springcreek Township
- Staunton Township
- Union Township
- Washington Township

=== Montgomery County ===
- Butler Township
- Clay Township
- German Township
- Harrison Township
- Jackson Township
- Jefferson Township
- Miami Township
- Perry Township
- Washington Township

== Combined statistical area ==
The Dayton–Springfield–Kettering Combined Statistical Area is a Combined Statistical Area in the U.S. state of Ohio, as defined by the United States Census Bureau. It consists of the Dayton Metropolitan Statistical Area (the counties of Montgomery, Greene and Miami); the Springfield, Ohio metropolitan area (Clark County); the Urbana Micropolitan Statistical Area (Champaign County); the Greenville Micropolitan Statistical Area (Darke County); and the Sidney Micropolitan Statistical Area (Shelby County). As of the 2020 Census, the CSA had a population of 1,086,512.

Statistical Area	2025 Estimate	2020 Census	Change	Area	Density
Dayton–Kettering–Beavercreek, OH Metropolitan Statistical Area	826,554	814,049	+1.54%	1,290 sq mi (3,300 km^{2})	641/sq mi (247/km^{2})
Springfield, OH Metropolitan Statistical Area	135,340	136,001	−0.49%	403 sq mi (1,040 km^{2})	336/sq mi (130/km^{2})
Greenville, OH Micropolitan Statistical Area	51,520	51,881	−0.70%	600 sq mi (1,600 km^{2})	86/sq mi (33/km^{2})
Sidney, OH Micropolitan Statistical Area	48,065	48,230	−0.34%	411 sq mi (1,060 km^{2})	117/sq mi (45/km^{2})
Urbana, OH Micropolitan Statistical Area	38,820	38,714	+0.27%	430 sq mi (1,100 km^{2})	90/sq mi (35/km^{2})
Total	1,100,299	1,088,875	+1.05%	3,134 sq mi (8,120 km^{2})	351/sq mi (136/km^{2})

According to an article in The Cincinnati Enquirer, as Greater Cincinnati grows northward through Butler County, its outer suburbs are expected to expand and begin to overlap the Greater Dayton area. Such a concept has already received the nickname of "Daytonnati." The two metropolitan areas were expected to be combined after tabulation of the 2010 Census, but this did not occur. As of the 2020 census this has still not occurred due to criteria not being met for combined area designation.

Greater Dayton is part of the Great Lakes megalopolis containing an estimated 54 million people.

== Demographics ==
Historical population
Census	Pop.	Note	%±
1900	161,759		—
1910	193,496		19.6%
1920	289,181		49.5%
1930	358,041		23.8%
1940	383,975		7.2%
1950	545,723		42.1%
1960	727,121		33.2%
1970	850,266		16.9%
1980	830,070		−2.4%
1990	843,835		1.7%
2000	848,153		0.5%
2010	799,232		−5.8%
2020	814,049		1.9%
Population 1990-2020

As of the census 2010, there were 799,232 people, 343,971 households, and 220,249 families residing within the MSA. The racial makeup of the MSA was 80.40% White, 14.90% African American, 0.20% Native American, 1.80% Asian, 0.01% Pacific Islander, 0.80% from other races, and 2.00% from two or more races. Hispanic or Latino of any race were 1.90% of the population.

The median income for a household in the MSA was $47,381, and the median income for a family was $59,770. Males had a median income of $38,430 versus $26,205 for females. The per capita income for the MSA was $25,436.

From the 2000 Census to the 2010 Census, the Dayton region has seen a shift in population from its urban core to more out-lying affluent suburbs. This is evidenced by a 10% growth in population in Englewood, a 19% population growth in Beavercreek, and a 40% population growth in Springboro. Smaller growths in the 2010 census in the Dayton area included Miamisburg, Centerville, Vandalia, and Fairborn. Many of Dayton's suburbs that saw declines in populations fared well from 2000 to 2010. Dayton's largest suburb, Kettering for example, only saw a 2.3% decline during the ten-year period and Huber Heights, Dayton's third largest suburb, saw a 0.3% decline in population.

The Dayton MSA formerly included Clark County and Preble County. In 2005, Clark County, containing Springfield, Ohio, was separated from the Dayton MSA to create the separate Springfield Metropolitan Statistical Area. As a result of new Census criteria to delineate metropolitan areas, Preble County was removed from the MSA in 2013 as it no longer qualified for inclusion. A significant drop in population for the Dayton MSA is noted in the 2010 census because of these changes.

County	Seat	2025 Estimate	2020 Census	Change	Area	Density
Montgomery	Dayton	539,598	537,309	+0.43%	464 sq mi (1,200 km^{2})	1,163/sq mi (449/km^{2})
Greene	Xenia	174,322	167,966	+3.78%	416 sq mi (1,080 km^{2})	419/sq mi (162/km^{2})
Miami	Troy	112,634	108,774	+3.55%	410 sq mi (1,100 km^{2})	275/sq mi (106/km^{2})
Total		826,554	814,049	+1.54%	1,290 sq mi (3,300 km^{2})	641/sq mi (247/km^{2})

== Colleges and universities ==
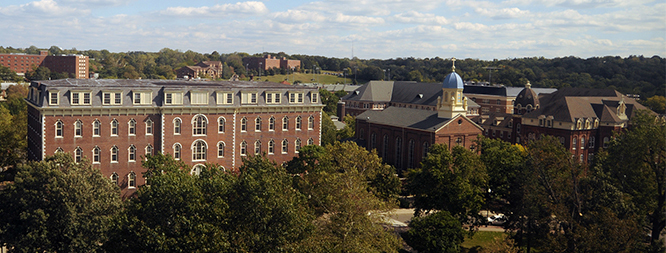
St. Mary's Hall and the Immaculate Conception Chapel at the University of Dayton.

Greater Dayton is home to a number of higher education facilities, including:

- Air Force Institute of Technology (Wright-Patterson AFB)
- Antioch College (Yellow Springs)
- Cedarville University (Cedarville)
- Central State University (Wilberforce)
- Kettering College of Medical Arts (Kettering)
- Sinclair Community College (Dayton)
- University of Dayton (Dayton)
- Wilberforce University (Wilberforce)
- Wittenberg University (Springfield)
- Wright State University (Fairborn)
- Clark State Community College (Springfield)

== Largest employers ==
Notable largest employers in the Dayton region :

- Wright-Patterson Air Force Base 30,000
- Premier Health Partners 14,335
- Kettering Health Network 9,500
- Montgomery County 5,029
- CareSource 4,500
- The Kroger Company 4,100
- Wright State University 3,095
- LexisNexis 3,000
- University of Dayton 2,978

== Transportation ==
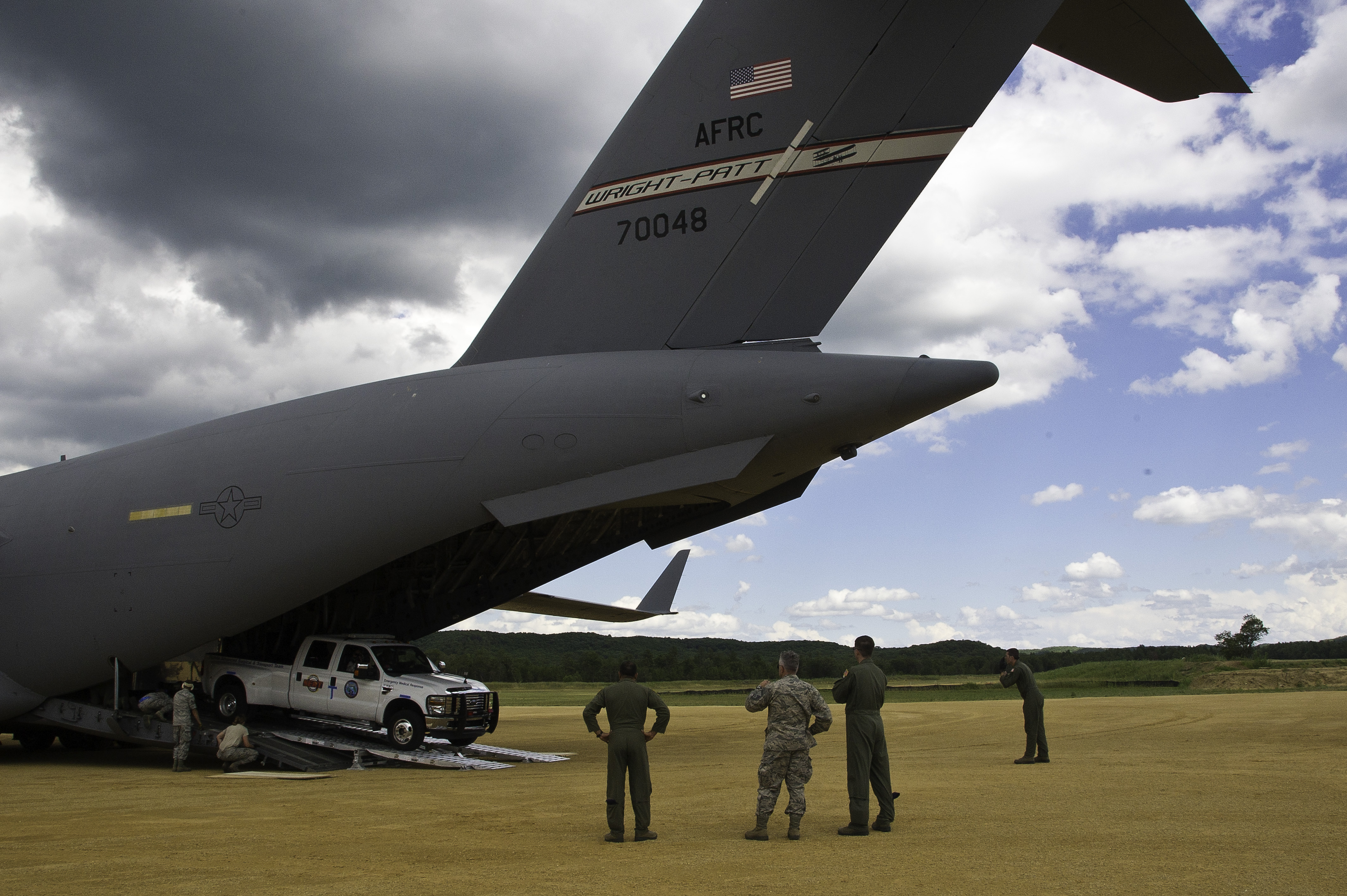
Equipment is unloaded from a C-17A Globemaster III of the 89th Airlift Squadron based at Wright-Patterson Air Force Base.

=== Airports ===
Greater Dayton is served by international, regional and county airports, including:

- Dahio Trotwood Airport
- Dayton International Airport
- Dayton–Wright Brothers Airport
- Greene County–Lewis A. Jackson Regional Airport
- Moraine Airpark
- Wright-Patterson Air Force Base

=== Major highways ===
- Interstate 70
- Interstate 75
- Interstate 675
- U.S. Route 35
- U.S. Route 36
- U.S. Route 40
- U.S. Route 42
- U.S. Route 68
- State Route 4
- State Route 41
- State Route 48
- State Route 49
- State Route 202
- State Route 235
- State Route 444
- State Route 725
- State Route 741
- State Route 844

=== Public transit ===
The Greater Dayton Regional Transit Authority operates a public busing system in Montgomery county. Other transit agencies serve the surrounding counties and provide connections with RTA, including transit authorities in Greene and Miami counties.

== Culture ==
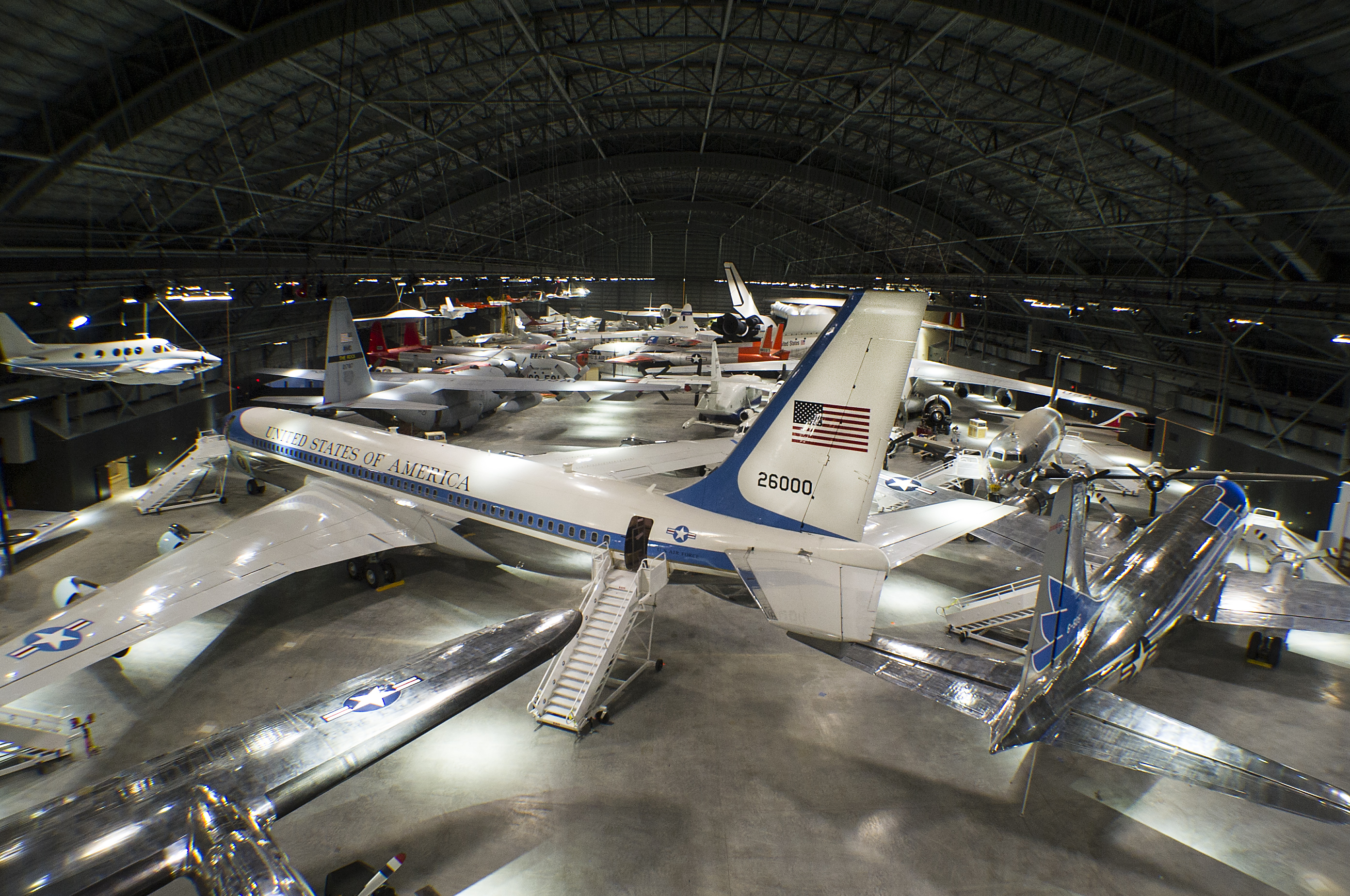
An overhead gallery view of the fourth building aircraft at the National Museum of the United States Air Force.

=== Museums ===
- Dayton Art Institute (Dayton)
- Boonshoft Museum of Discovery (Dayton)
- America's Packard Museum (Dayton)
- National Museum of the United States Air Force (Riverside)

=== Theaters ===
In addition to the Benjamin and Marian Schuster Performing Arts Center, the Dayton Region's largest performing arts center, Greater Dayton has several other theater institutions throughout the region.

- La Comedia Dinner Theatre (Springboro)
- Loft Theatre (Dayton)
- Town Hall Theatre (Centerville)
- Victoria Theatre (Dayton)

=== Theatrical companies ===
- Dayton Ballet
- Dayton Contemporary Dance Company
- Dayton Opera
- Victoria Theatre Association

=== Music ===
- Dayton Philharmonic Orchestra

== See also ==
- Ohio census statistical areas
