= Jefferson Township, Preble County, Ohio =

Township in Ohio, US

- Township
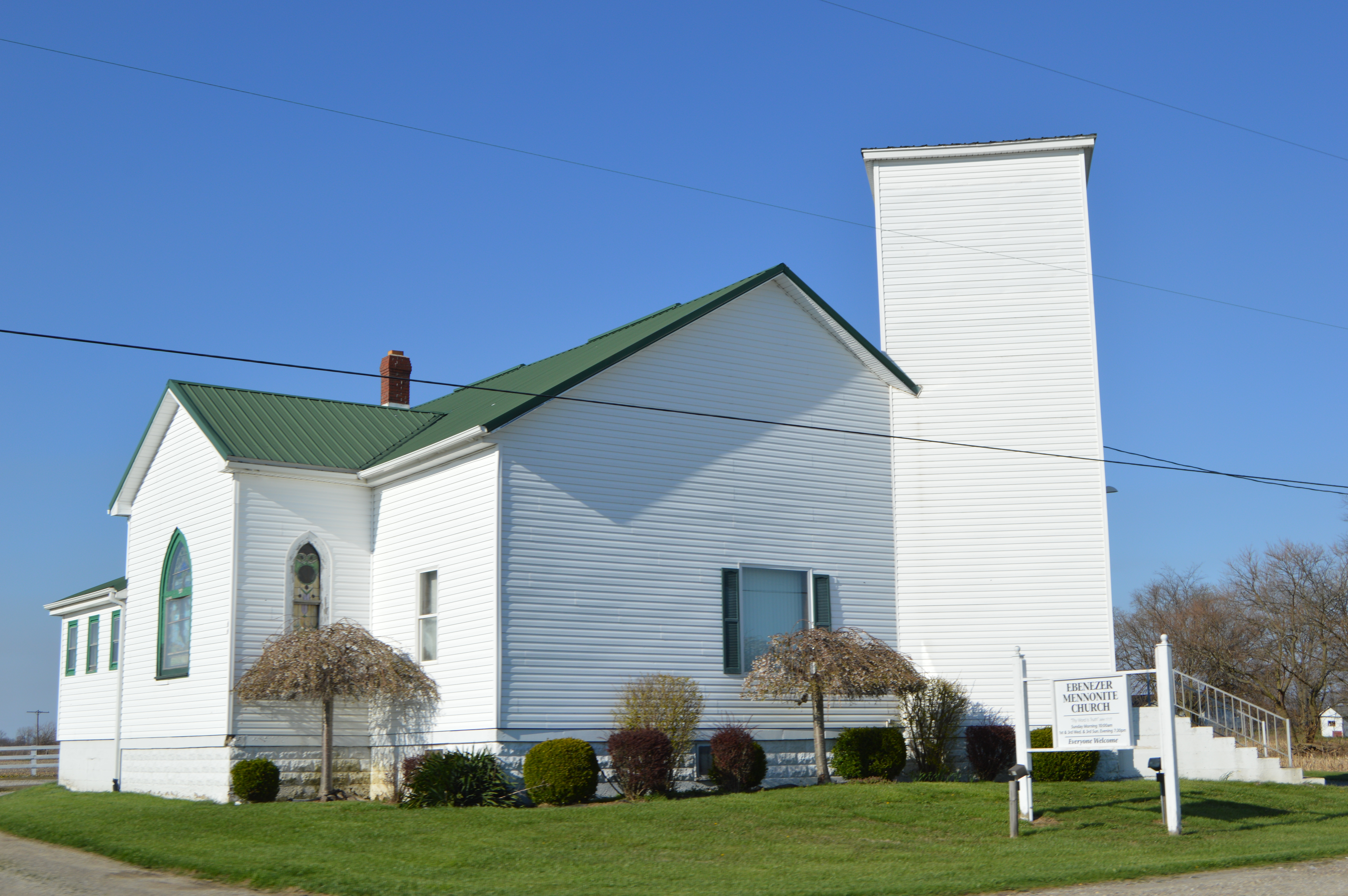
- Ebenezer Mennonite Church at Gettysburg

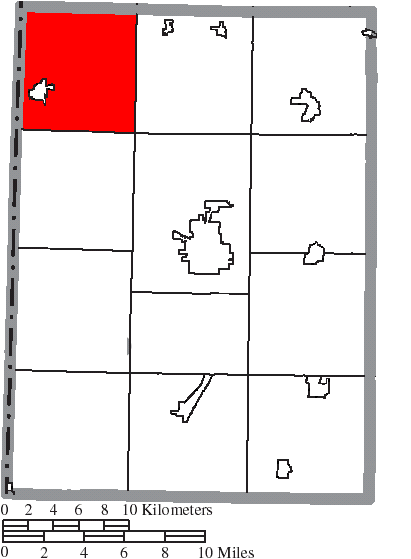
- Location of Jefferson Township in Preble County
- Coordinates: 39°51′22″N 84°46′14″W
- Country: United States
- State: Ohio
- County: Preble

Area
  - Total: 35.4 sq mi (91.8 km^{2})
  - Land: 35.3 sq mi (91.5 km^{2})
  - Water: 0.15 sq mi (0.4 km^{2})
- Elevation: 1,161 ft (354 m)

Population (2020)
  - Total: 3,226
  - Density: 91/sq mi (35.3/km^{2})
- Time zone: UTC-5 (Eastern (EST))
  - Summer (DST): UTC-4 (EDT)
- Area code: 937
- FIPS code: 39-38780
- GNIS feature ID: 1086851

Jefferson Township is one of the twelve townships of Preble County, Ohio, United States. The 2020 census found 3,226 people in the township. The Jefferson community is served by National Trail High School and the National Trail Local School district. Interstate 70 runs along the southern part of the township.

== Geography ==
Located in the northwestern corner of the county, it borders the following townships:

- Harrison Township, Darke County - north
- Butler Township, Darke County - northeast corner
- Monroe Township - east
- Washington Township - southeast corner
- Jackson Township - south
- Wayne Township, Wayne County, Indiana - west
- Franklin Township, Wayne County, Indiana - northwest

The village of New Paris is located in western Jefferson Township.

== Name and history ==
Jefferson Township was organized in 1809, and named for Thomas Jefferson, third President of the United States. It is one of twenty-four Jefferson Townships statewide.

== Government ==
The township is governed by a three-member board of trustees, who are elected in November of odd-numbered years to a four-year term beginning on the following January 1. Two are elected in the year after the presidential election and one is elected in the year before it. There is also an elected township fiscal officer, who serves a four-year term beginning on April 1 of the year after the election, which is held in November of the year before the presidential election. Vacancies in the fiscal officership or on the board of trustees are filled by the remaining trustees.

== Fire and EMS Services ==
Fire and EMS services are provided Northwest Fire and Ambulance District. The department is stationed in New Pairs and was originally the New Paris Fire Department. In 1984 the New Paris Community passed a levy to combine the New Paris Fire Department and the New Paris-Jefferson Township Emergency Squad into the Northwest Fire and Ambulance District on January 1, 1985. They also serve the Northern part of Jackson Township, Preble County, Ohio
