= National Trail High School =

High school in New Paris, Ohio, United States

Location
- 6940 Oxford-Gettysburg Road; New Paris, Preble County, Ohio 45347; United States; 39°50′12″N 84°43′20″W

Information
- Funding type: Public
- Established: 1968
- School district: National Trail Local School District
- Superintendent: Jennifer S. Couch
- Principal: David Herring
- Teaching staff: 20.50 (FTE)
- Grades: 9-12
- Enrollment: 273 (2023-2024)
- Student to teacher ratio: 13.32
- Campus: K-12 Complex
- Campus type: rural
- Colors: Orange & Brown
- Fight song: Mighty Blazer! (Mighty Oregon!)
- Athletics conference: Western Ohio Athletic Conference
- Mascot: Blazers
- Nickname: NT
- Yearbook: The Flame
- Website: https://www.nationaltrail.k12.oh.us/course/section.php?id=802

National Trail High School is a public high school in New Paris, Ohio. It is the only high school in the National Trail Local School district. The district serves students from New Paris Ohio, Eldorado, Ohio, and West Manchester, Ohio, along with all of Jefferson Township, Monroe Township, and Jackson Township. The K-12 school complex is located in the southeastern portion of Jefferson Township, near Eaton, Ohio.

== History ==
The National Trail Local School District was established in 1965 after the consolidation of Jackson, Jefferson, and Monroe High Schools. The schools first graduating class was in 1969. The current High School was built in 1968 serving students from all three townships. The Middle School was housed at the former Monroe High School building and the elementary was housed at the former Jefferson building until 1999 when the district built a new Elementary and Middle school attached to the High School. The district's K-12 complex resides along U.S. Route 40, near I 70. The Jefferson township building housed a portion of the New Paris police department and other amenities until it was demolished in 2020, adding area for the Village of New Paris community Park.

== Clubs and activities ==
- Marching Band and Concert Band
- Art Club
- Renaissance Club
- Drama Club
- FCCLA
- Foreign Language Club
- Quiz Bowl
- Science Olympiad
- National Honor Society
- Student Council

=== FFA ===
National Trail's FFA chapter is nationally recognized by their competition success and agricultural opportunity. NT has a rich history at the state and local level, competing in and winning numerous FFA state competitions. 75% of the student population partake in FFA. The organization provides opportunity for students to develop skills in leadership, personal growth, and career success through agriculture education.

=== Steel Band ===
National Trail is one of the few schools in the state of Ohio to have a Steel Band. The 'Advanced' Steel band will travel to play at area festivals and community events.

== Athletics ==
National Trail was a member of the Cross County Conference for 42 years (1978–2020), capturing over 55 league titles during that time, before joining the Western Ohio Athletic Conference in the fall of 2021, along with county rivals Tri-County North High School and Twin Valley South High School.

The golf team plays their home matches at Highland Lake Golf Course. The Swim team hosts meets at the Preble County YMCA.

=== Sports Fielded ===
- Football
- Girls Soccer
- Boys and Girls Cross Country
- Volleyball
- Boys and Girls Golf
- Boys and Girls Basketball
- Wrestling
- Cheerleading
- Swimming
- Baseball
- Softball
- Boys and Girls Track and Field

=== OHSAA State Runner-Up ===
- Girls Softball - 1986

=== OHSAA State Final Four ===
- Girls Volleyball - 1996
- Girls Cross Country - 1989 (3rd place as a team)
- Boys Cross Country - 1966 (4th place as a team)
- Boys Baseball - 1963

== Staff ==
- The superintendent of the school district is Jennifer Couch.
- The principal of the high school is David Herring.

== Notable alumni ==
- Travis Miller, Former MLB player (Minnesota Twins)
