= Travis Miller (baseball) =

American baseball player

- Pitcher
- Born: November 2, 1972 (age 53); Dayton, Ohio, U.S.
- Batted: Right Threw: Left

MLB debut
- August 25, 1996, for the Minnesota Twins

Last MLB appearance
- June 25, 2002, for the Minnesota Twins

MLB statistics
- Win–loss record: 7–18
- Earned run average: 5.05
- Strikeouts: 199
- Stats at Baseball Reference

Teams
- Minnesota Twins (1996–2002)

Travis Eugene Miller (born November 2, 1972) is an American former professional baseball player who pitched from 1996–2002 for the Minnesota Twins of Major League Baseball (MLB). He is currently the athletic director for Eaton Community Schools in Eaton, Ohio.

== Career ==
Miller attended National Trail High School in New Paris, Ohio, and played collegiately at Kent State University. In 1994, he was named the Mid-American Conference Baseball Pitcher of the Year.

Miller won 7 games in the majors, losing 18. On May 9, 2000, he picked up his lone major league save against the Indians. Miller came in and retired the last batter of the game to preserve a 6-5 Twins victory.
