= Cedar Springs, Ohio =

Unincorporated community in Ohio, U.S.

Coordinates: 39°50′17″N 84°47′39″W

Cedar Springs is an unincorporated community in Preble County, in the U.S. state of Ohio.

== History ==
Natural springs in the area were believed by Native Americans to hold medicinal qualities. Cedar Springs had its start in the 1870s when a hotel opened at the springs. By 1900, the hotel had 100 rooms and attracted enough visitors that an electric interurban railroad branch was built from New Westville to nearby New Paris to accommodate tourists; the hotel closed in the 1930s. More recently, Cedar Springs became the site of one of the first dedicated tiny house developments in the United States.
