= West Sonora, Ohio =

Unincorporated community in Ohio, U.S.

Coordinates: 39°53′20″N 84°32′28″W

West Sonora is an unincorporated community in Preble County, in the U.S. state of Ohio.

== History ==
A former variant name was Sonora. Sonora had its start around 1852, when the railroad was extended to that point. A post office called West Sonora was established in 1855, and remained in operation until 1940.
