= Brennersville, Ohio =

Unincorporated community in Ohio, U.S.

Coordinates: 39°48′07″N 84°34′39″W

Brennersville is an unincorporated community in Preble County, in the U.S. state of Ohio.

== History ==
Brennersville was founded around 1825 or 1835 (sources vary) by John Brenner, and named for him. A post office called Brennersville was established in 1851, and remained in operation until 1855.
