= Brynlee (given name) =

- Gender: Feminine

Origin
- Origin: English
- Meaning: Variant spelling of a surname or place name meaning “burned clearing”; modern combination of Bryn and Lee.

Brynlee is a modern English feminine given name, which could be derived either from a modern combination of the names Bryn and Lee or from a respelling of the English surname and place name Brinley, meaning “burned clearing.” The name's sound pattern and names ending in -lee are currently fashionable in the United States.

== Popularity ==
The name has ranked among the top 1,000 names for girls in the United States since 2008 and among the top 200 names for American girls since 2019. There are multiple spelling variants of the name in use. Brinley has ranked among the top 1,000 names for American girls since 2009 and among the top 500 since 2014. Variant spelling Brynleigh has also ranked among the top 1,000 names for girls in 2018 and again in 2020 and 2021 in the United States. Other variants in use include Brinlee, Brinleigh, Brinnleigh, Brinly, Brinnley, Brynlea, Brynlei, Brynley, Brynli, Brynlie, Brynly, Brynnlee, Brynnley, Brynnleigh, Brynnlie, and Brynnly.
