= Chautauqua, Ohio =

Unincorporated community in Ohio, U.S.

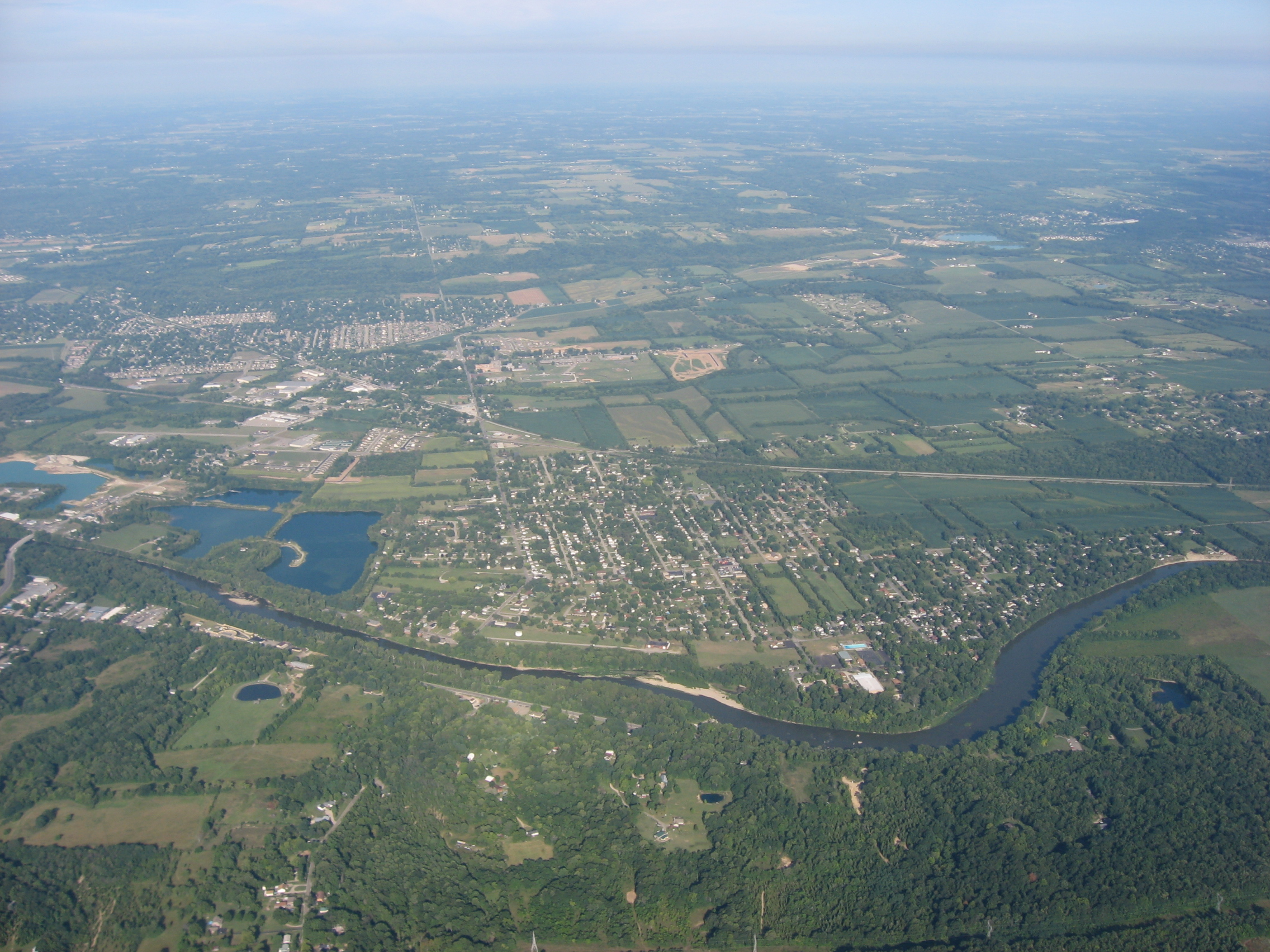
Aerial view of Chautauqua

Chautauqua (/tʃəˈtɔːkwə/ chə-TAW-kwə), also Chautaugua or Chatauqua, is an unincorporated community in Montgomery and Warren counties in the U.S. state of Ohio. Chautauqua is located at 39°35′28″N 84°17′47″W (39.591072, -84.296293). It lies on the west bank of the Great Miami River at the county boundary. It was established in 1901 with 310 acres (1.3 km^{2}). The members of the Miami Valley Chautauqua Association lived in common in the town, occupying about two hundred homes.

The Montgomery County portion of Chautauqua is part of the Dayton Metropolitan Statistical Area, while the Warren County portion is part of the Cincinnati–Middletown, OH-KY-IN Metropolitan Statistical Area.
