= Greenbush, Preble County, Ohio =

Unincorporated community in Ohio, U.S.

Coordinates: 39°36′05″N 84°29′55″W

Greenbush is an unincorporated community in Preble County, in the U.S. state of Ohio.

== History ==
A post office called Greenbush was established in 1852, and remained in operation until 1906. Greenbush was platted in 1861.
