= Browns, Ohio =

Unincorporated community in Ohio, U.S.

Coordinates: 39°54′09″N 84°35′59″W

Browns is an unincorporated community in Preble County, in the U.S. state of Ohio.

== History ==
A former variant name was Brown's Station. Brown's Station was not officially platted. A post office called Browns Station was established in 1869, and remained in operation until 1874.
