= Sampleville, Ohio =

- Unincorporated community
- Location within Ohio Location within the United States
- Coordinates: 39°44′34″N 84°34′35″W
- Country: United States
- State: Ohio
- County: Preble
- Elevation: 981 ft (299 m)
- Time zone: UTC-5 (Eastern (EST))
  - Summer (DST): UTC-4 (EDT)
- Area codes: 937, 326
- GNIS feature ID: 1061653

Sampleville (also Kitsom Corners, Kitson Corner) is an unincorporated community in Preble County, Ohio, United States.
