= Dadsville, Ohio =

Unincorporated community in Ohio, U.S.

Coordinates: 39°44′40″N 84°30′03″W

Dadsville is an unincorporated community in Preble County, in the U.S. state of Ohio.

Cedar Springs is located near the Ohio's border with Indiana east of the city of Richmond, Indiana along Interstate 70 and U.S. Routes 35 and 40.

== History ==
Dadsville has its start in 1898 when the Dayton & Western Electric Line was extended to that point. The community was named for John "Daddy" Baker, an early settler.
