= West Florence, Ohio =

Unincorporated community in Ohio, U.S.

Coordinates: 39°44′38″N 84°45′38″W

West Florence is an unincorporated community in Preble County, in the U.S. state of Ohio.

== History ==
West Florence was originally called Florence, and under the latter name was platted in 1835. A post office called West Florence was established in 1837, and remained in operation until 1906.
