= Enterprise, Preble County, Ohio =

Unincorporated community in Ohio, U.S.

Coordinates: 39°41′49″N 84°30′02″W

Enterprise is an unincorporated community in Preble County, in the U.S. state of Ohio.

== History ==
The first settlement at Enterprise was made in 1836. A post office was established at Enterprise in 1846, and remained in operation until 1864. Enterprise was not platted until 1880.
