= Verona, Ohio =

- Village
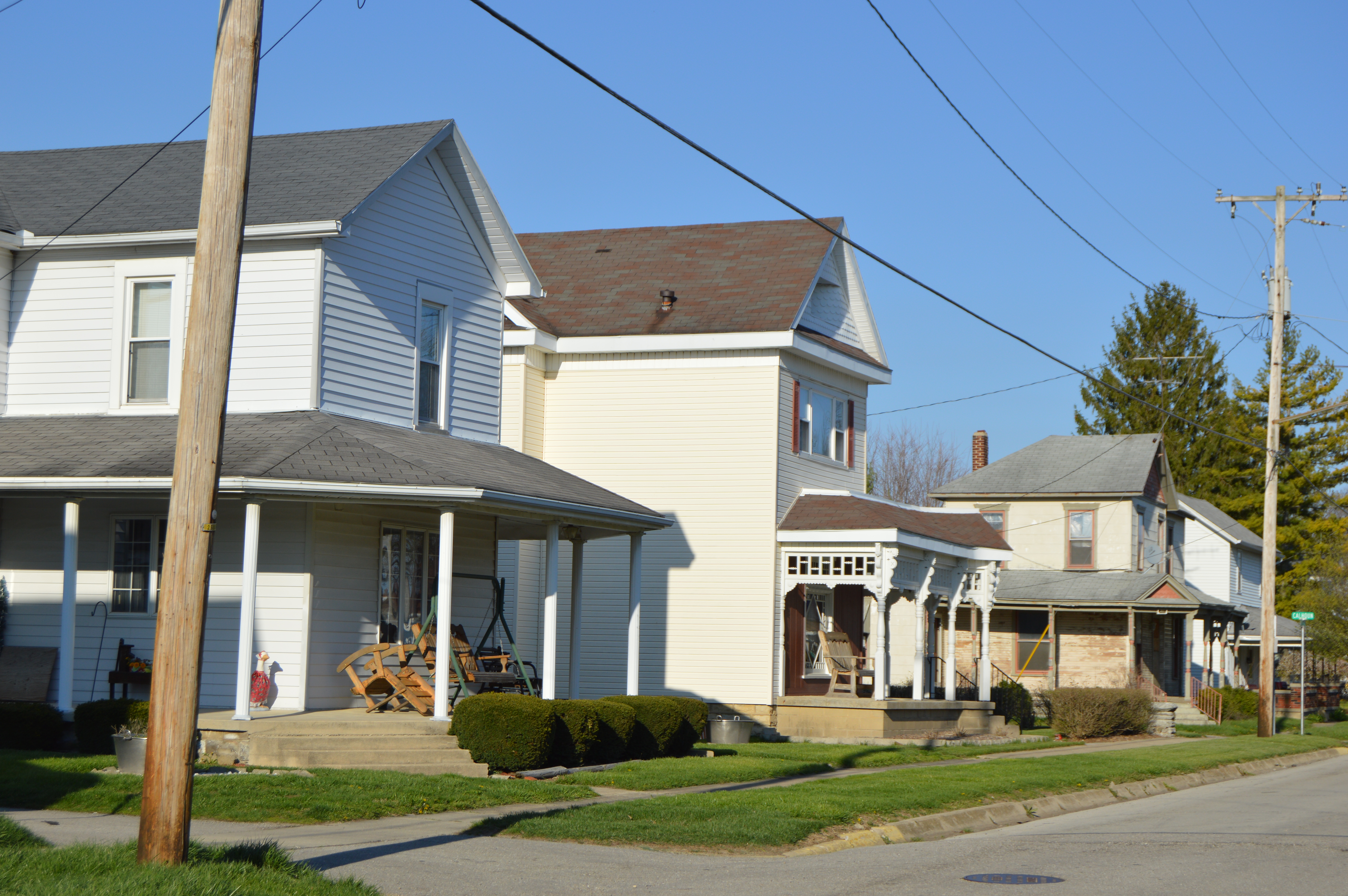
- Main Street in Preble County

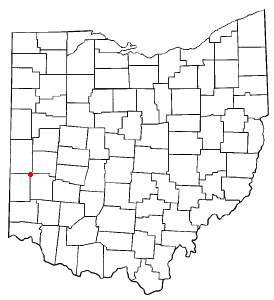
- Location of Verona, Ohio

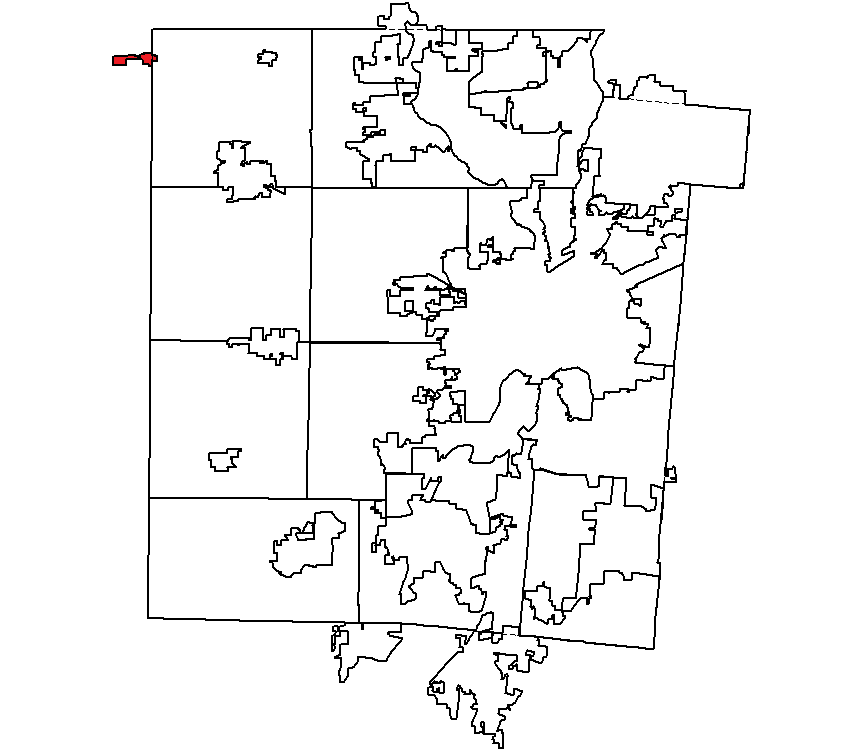
- Location within Montgomery County, Ohio
- Coordinates: 39°54′06″N 84°30′05″W
- Country: United States
- State: Ohio
- Counties: Montgomery, Preble

Area
  - Total: 0.46 sq mi (1.20 km^{2})
  - Land: 0.46 sq mi (1.18 km^{2})
  - Water: 0.0077 sq mi (0.02 km^{2})
- Elevation: 1,017 ft (310 m)

Population (2020)
  - Total: 403
  - Density: 883.8/sq mi (341.23/km^{2})
- Time zone: UTC-5 (Eastern (EST))
  - Summer (DST): UTC-4 (EDT)
- ZIP code: 45378
- Area codes: 937, 326
- FIPS code: 39-79898
- GNIS feature ID: 2400064
- Website: villageofverona.com

Verona is a village in Montgomery and Preble counties in the U.S. state of Ohio. The population was 403 at the 2020 census. It is part of the Dayton Metropolitan Statistical Area.

== Geography ==
According to the United States Census Bureau, the village has a total area of 0.47 square miles (1.22 km^{2}), of which 0.46 square miles (1.19 km^{2}) is land and 0.01 square miles (0.03 km^{2}) is water.

== Demographics ==
Historical population
Census	Pop.	Note	%±
1880	221		—
1920	317		—
1930	310		−2.2%
1940	346		11.6%
1950	426		23.1%
1960	527		23.7%
1970	593		12.5%
1980	571		−3.7%
1990	472		−17.3%
2000	430		−8.9%
2010	494		14.9%
2020	403		−18.4%
U.S. Decennial Census

=== 2010 census ===
As of the census of 2010, there were 494 people, 180 households, and 124 families living in the village. The population density was 1,073.9 inhabitants per square mile (414.6/km^{2}). There were 199 housing units at an average density of 432.6 per square mile (167.0/km^{2}). The racial makeup of the village was 98.6% White and 1.4% from two or more races.

There were 180 households, of which 36.7% had children under the age of 18 living with them, 56.1% were married couples living together, 7.2% had a female householder with no husband present, 5.6% had a male householder with no wife present, and 31.1% were non-families. 26.1% of all households were made up of individuals, and 8.9% had someone living alone who was 65 years of age or older. The average household size was 2.74 and the average family size was 3.23.

The median age in the village was 37.3 years. 25.5% of residents were under the age of 18; 9.2% were between the ages of 18 and 24; 28.8% were from 25 to 44; 24.3% were from 45 to 64; and 12.3% were 65 years of age or older. The gender makeup of the village was 50.4% male and 49.6% female.

=== 2000 census ===
As of the census of 2000, there were 430 people, 158 households, and 112 families living in the village. The population density was 2,529.1 inhabitants per square mile (976.5/km^{2}). There were 166 housing units at an average density of 976.4 per square mile (377.0/km^{2}). The racial makeup of the village was 99.77% White, and 0.23% from two or more races. Hispanic or Latino of any race were 0.93% of the population.

There were 158 households, out of which 38.0% had children under the age of 18 living with them, 62.7% were married couples living together, 6.3% had a female householder with no husband present, and 28.5% were non-families. 24.7% of all households were made up of individuals, and 5.7% had someone living alone who was 65 years of age or older. The average household size was 2.72 and the average family size was 3.26.

In the village, the population was spread out, with 31.2% under the age of 18, 9.1% from 18 to 24, 30.5% from 25 to 44, 21.2% from 45 to 64, and 8.1% who were 65 years of age or older. The median age was 34 years. For every 100 females there were 101.9 males. For every 100 females age 18 and over, there were 107.0 males.

The median income for a household in the village was $34,107, and the median income for a family was $38,750. Males had a median income of $33,333 versus $24,219 for females. The per capita income for the village was $14,468. About 5.6% of families and 8.4% of the population were below the poverty line, including 11.3% of those under age 18 and none of those age 65 or over.
