= Talawanda Springs, Ohio =

Unincorporated community in Ohio, U.S.

Coordinates: 39°34′44″N 84°48′14″W

Talawanda Springs (/ˌtæləˈwɑːndə/) is an unincorporated community in Preble County, in the U.S. state of Ohio.

Talawanda ("clear water") is the Native American name for nearby Four Mile Creek.
