= New Lexington, Preble County, Ohio =

Unincorporated community in Ohio, U.S.

Coordinates: 39°45′36″N 84°32′02″W

New Lexington is an unincorporated community in Preble County, in the U.S. state of Ohio.

== History ==
New Lexington was laid out and platted in 1805, making it the oldest existing settlement in Preble County. The community was named after Lexington, Kentucky, the native home of a first settler, James Irwin Nisbet (1777–1830), who executed the original survey.
