= Cedar Springs, Arizona =

- Populated place
- Location within the state of Arizona Cedar Springs, Arizona (the United States)
- Coordinates: 35°27′06″N 110°21′51″W
- Country: United States
- State: Arizona
- County: Navajo
- Elevation: 6,280 ft (1,914 m)
- Time zone: UTC-7 (Mountain (MST))
  - Summer (DST): UTC-7 (MST)
- Area code: 928
- FIPS code: 04-11490
- GNIS feature ID: 24352

Cedar Springs is a populated place situated in Navajo County, Arizona, United States. It has an estimated elevation of 6,279 feet (1,914 m) above sea level.
