= Brinley, Ohio =

Unincorporated community in Ohio, U.S.

Coordinates: 39°53′40″N 84°44′23″W

Brinley is an unincorporated community in Preble County, in the U.S. state of Ohio.

== History ==
A former variant name was Brinleys Station. Brinleys Station had its start in 1855 when Sylvester Brinley gave a portion of his land for a railroad station, in exchange for naming rights. A post office was established under the name Brinleys Station in 1860, the name was changed to Brinley in 1882, and the post office closed in 1902.
