= Sugar Valley, Ohio =

Unincorporated community in Ohio, U.S.

Coordinates: 39°41′32″N 84°42′47″W

Sugar Valley is an unincorporated community in Preble County, in the U.S. state of Ohio.

== History ==
Sugar Valley was laid out and platted in 1849. The Sugar Valley post office was discontinued in 1902.
