= West Elkton, Ohio =

- Village
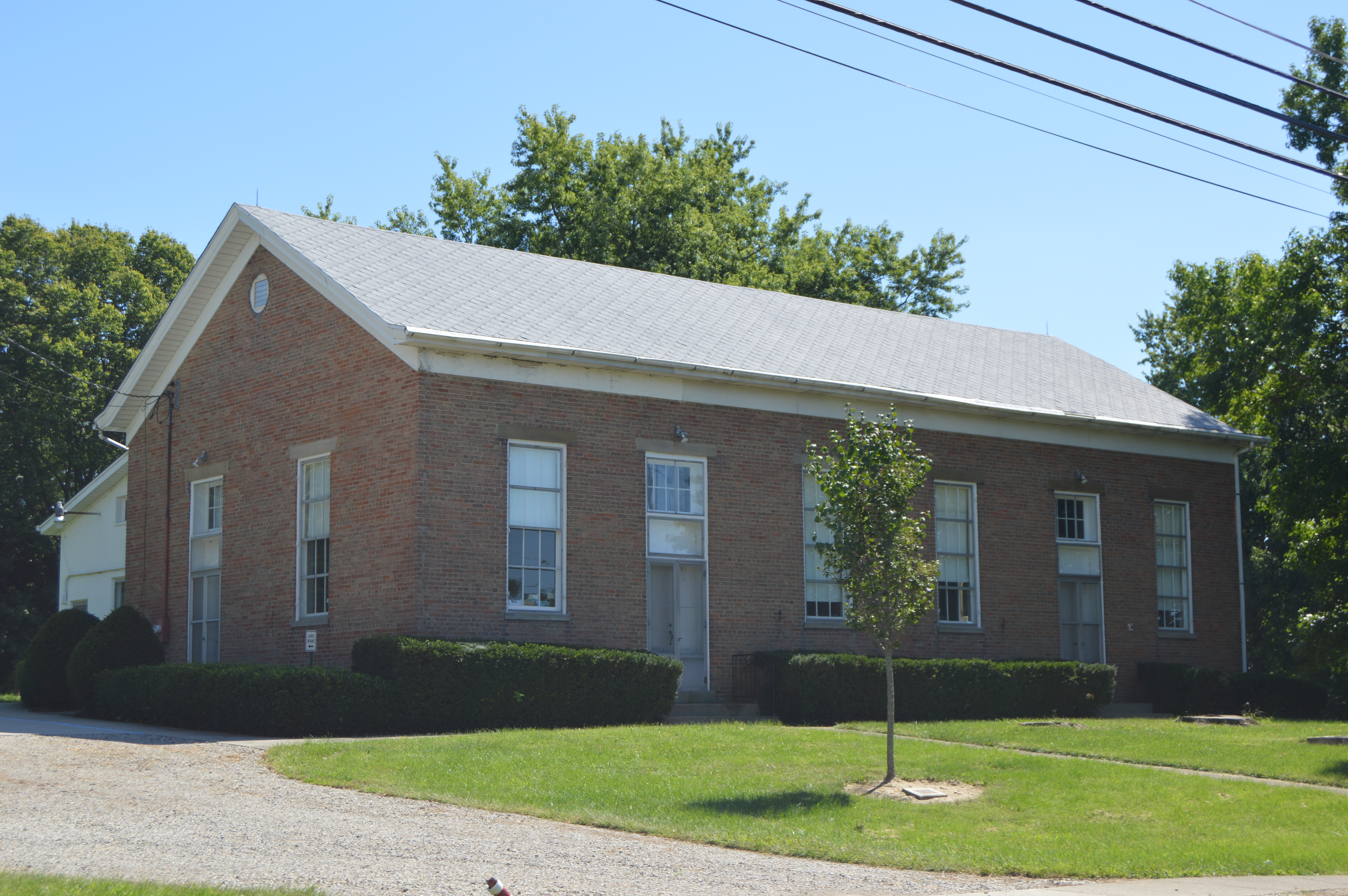
- Friends meeting house

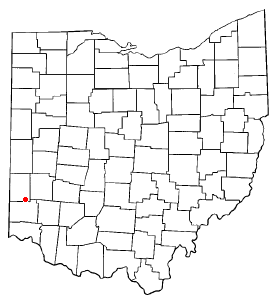
- Location of West Elkton, Ohio

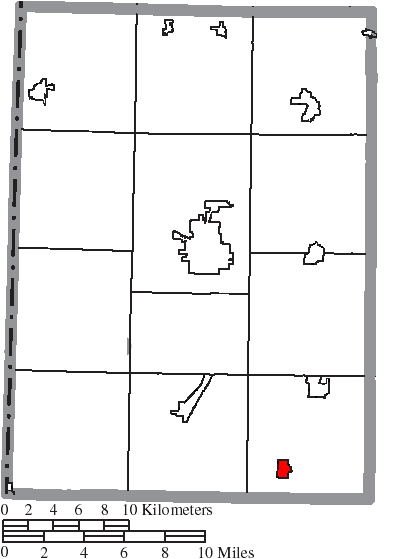
- Location of West Elkton in Preble County
- Coordinates: 39°35′17″N 84°33′35″W
- Country: United States
- State: Ohio
- County: Preble

Area
  - Total: 0.58 sq mi (1.51 km^{2})
  - Land: 0.58 sq mi (1.51 km^{2})
  - Water: 0 sq mi (0.00 km^{2})
- Elevation: 1,034 ft (315 m)

Population (2020)
  - Total: 164
  - Density: 281.1/sq mi (108.53/km^{2})
- Time zone: UTC-5 (Eastern (EST))
  - Summer (DST): UTC-4 (EDT)
- ZIP code: 45070
- Area codes: 937 and 326
- FIPS code: 39-83216
- GNIS feature ID: 2400130

West Elkton is a village in Preble County, Ohio, United States. The population was 164 at the 2020 census. It is part of the Dayton Metropolitan Statistical Area.

== History ==
West Elkton was laid out in 1847. A post office called West Elkton has been in operation since 1844.

== Geography ==
According to the United States Census Bureau, the village has a total area of 0.58 square miles (1.50 km^{2}), all land.

== Demographics ==
Historical population
| Census | Pop. | Note | %± |
|---|---|---|---|
| 1860 | 185 | | — |
| 1870 | 156 | | −15.7% |
| 1880 | 247 | | 58.3% |
| 1890 | 216 | | −12.6% |
| 1900 | 215 | | −0.5% |
| 1910 | 230 | | 7.0% |
| 1920 | 204 | | −11.3% |
| 1930 | 225 | | 10.3% |
| 1940 | 223 | | −0.9% |
| 1950 | 297 | | 33.2% |
| 1960 | 345 | | 16.2% |
| 1970 | 291 | | −15.7% |
| 1980 | 277 | | −4.8% |
| 1990 | 208 | | −24.9% |
| 2000 | 194 | | −6.7% |
| 2010 | 197 | | 1.5% |
| 2020 | 164 | | −16.8% |
U.S. Decennial Census

=== 2010 census ===
As of the census of 2010, there were 197 people, 76 households, and 55 families living in the village. The population density was 339.7 inhabitants per square mile (131.2/km^{2}). There were 86 housing units at an average density of 148.3 per square mile (57.3/km^{2}). The racial makeup of the village was 97.0% White, 0.5% African American, 1.5% Asian, 0.5% from other races, and 0.5% from two or more races. Hispanic or Latino of any race were 0.5% of the population.

There were 76 households, of which 39.5% had children under the age of 18 living with them, 50.0% were married couples living together, 11.8% had a female householder with no husband present, 10.5% had a male householder with no wife present, and 27.6% were non-families. 23.7% of all households were made up of individuals, and 11.9% had someone living alone who was 65 years of age or older. The average household size was 2.59 and the average family size was 2.98.

The median age in the village was 39.3 years. 24.4% of residents were under the age of 18; 9.2% were between the ages of 18 and 24; 26.4% were from 25 to 44; 25.9% were from 45 to 64; and 14.2% were 65 years of age or older. The gender makeup of the village was 54.8% male and 45.2% female.

=== 2000 census ===
As of the census of 2000, there were 194 people, 71 households, and 50 families living in the village. The population density was 383.2 inhabitants per square mile (148.0/km^{2}). There were 81 housing units at an average density of 160.0 per square mile (61.8/km^{2}). The racial makeup of the village was 98.97% White, 0.52% from other races, and 0.52% from two or more races. Hispanic or Latino of any race were 0.52% of the population.

There were 71 households, out of which 29.6% had children under the age of 18 living with them, 53.5% were married couples living together, 14.1% had a female householder with no husband present, and 28.2% were non-families. 25.4% of all households were made up of individuals, and 16.9% had someone living alone who was 65 years of age or older. The average household size was 2.73 and the average family size was 3.20.

In the village, the population was spread out, with 28.9% under the age of 18, 7.2% from 18 to 24, 33.0% from 25 to 44, 19.1% from 45 to 64, and 11.9% who were 65 years of age or older. The median age was 34 years. For every 100 females there were 113.2 males. For every 100 females age 18 and over, there were 106.0 males.

The median income for a household in the village was $40,417, and the median income for a family was $38,333. Males had a median income of $40,938 versus $25,500 for females. The per capita income for the village was $16,676. About 9.4% of families and 8.2% of the population were below the poverty line, including 10.0% of those under the age of eighteen and none of those 65 or over.

== Education ==
Preble Shawnee Local Schools operated West Elkton Elementary (later Intermediate) School in the village until the end of the 2021 school year.

West Elkton has a public library, a branch of the Preble County District Library.
