= New Westville, Ohio =

Unincorporated community in Ohio, U.S.

Coordinates: 39°49′21″N 84°47′33″W

New Westville is an unincorporated community in Preble County, in the U.S. state of Ohio.

== History ==
New Westville was originally called Westville, and under the latter name was platted in 1816. New Westville never fully developed after it was bypassed by the railroad to the south; by 1915 its population was estimated as 65. A post office called New Westville was established in 1840, and remained in operation until 1893.
