= Jackson Township, Preble County, Ohio =

Township in Ohio, US

- Township
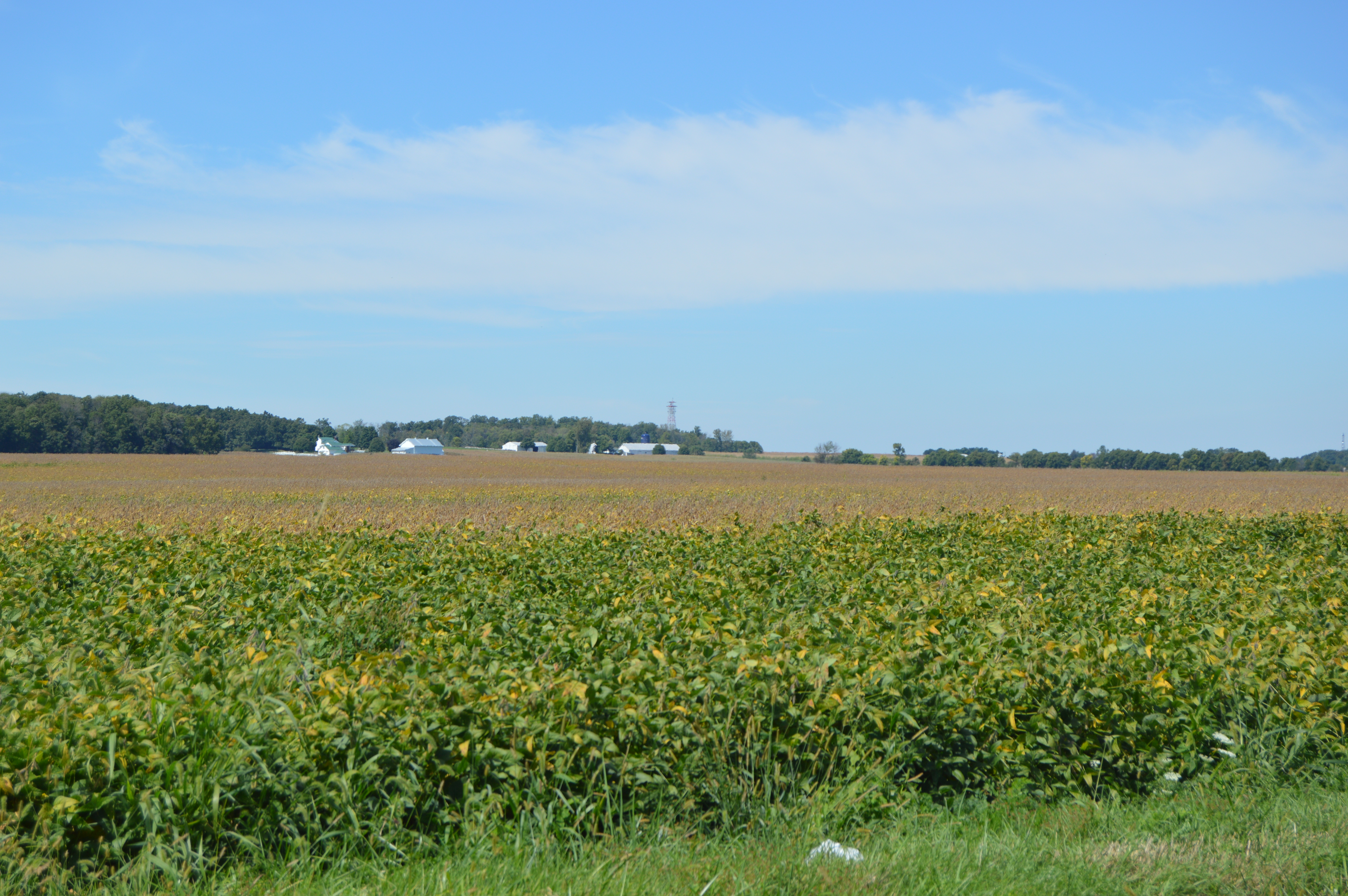
- Fields on Toby Road

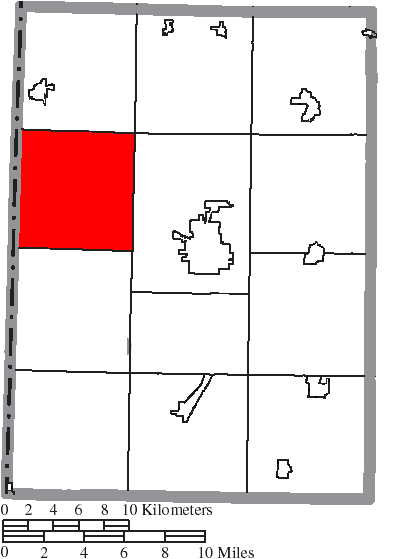
- Location of Jackson Township in Preble County
- Coordinates: 39°47′18″N 84°45′34″W
- Country: United States
- State: Ohio
- County: Preble

Area
  - Total: 34.4 sq mi (89.1 km^{2})
  - Land: 34.4 sq mi (89.1 km^{2})
  - Water: 0 sq mi (0.0 km^{2})
- Elevation: 1,161 ft (354 m)

Population (2020)
  - Total: 1,141
  - Density: 33.2/sq mi (12.8/km^{2})
- Time zone: UTC-5 (Eastern (EST))
  - Summer (DST): UTC-4 (EDT)
- FIPS code: 39-38010
- GNIS feature ID: 1086850

Jackson Township is one of the twelve townships of Preble County, Ohio, United States. The 2020 census found 1,141 people within the township. The Jackson community is served by National Trail High School and the National Trail Local School District. Interstate 70 runs along the northern part of the township.

== Geography ==
Located in the northwestern part of the county, it borders the following townships:

- Jefferson Township - north
- Monroe Township - northeast corner
- Washington Township - east
- Dixon Township - south
- Boston Township, Wayne County, Indiana - southwest
- Wayne Township, Wayne County, Indiana - northwest

No municipalities are located in Jackson Township.

== Name and history ==
Jackson Township was founded in 1816, and named for General Andrew Jackson, afterward seventh President of the United States. It is one of thirty-seven Jackson Townships statewide.

== Government ==
The township is governed by a three-member board of trustees, who are elected in November of odd-numbered years to a four-year term beginning on the following January 1. Two are elected in the year after the presidential election and one is elected in the year before it. There is also an elected township fiscal officer, who serves a four-year term beginning on April 1 of the year after the election, which is held in November of the year before the presidential election. Vacancies in the fiscal officership or on the board of trustees are filled by the remaining trustees.
