= Gettysburg, Preble County, Ohio =

Unincorporated community in Ohio, U.S.

Coordinates: 39°50′26″N 84°43′14″W

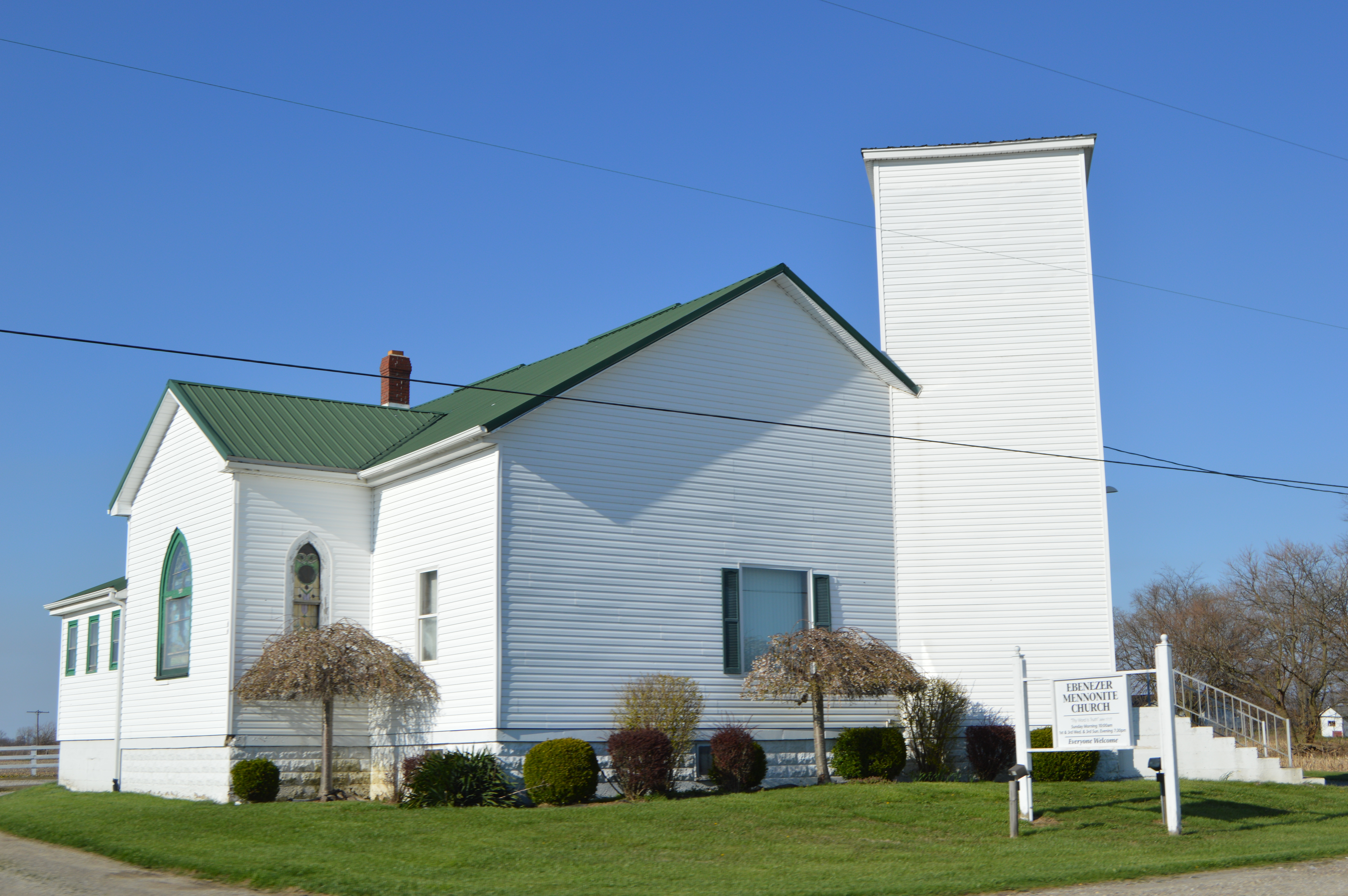
Ebenezer Mennonite Church

Gettysburg is an unincorporated community in Preble County, in the U.S. state of Ohio. The National Trail Local School K-12 complex is located on U.S. Route 40 in Gettysburg.

== History ==
Gettysburg was laid out in 1832 when the National Road was extended to that point. The community was named after Gettysburg, in Pennsylvania, the native state of a first settler. A post office called Gettysburg was established in 1837, and remained in operation until 1858.
