= Eaton, Ohio =

- City
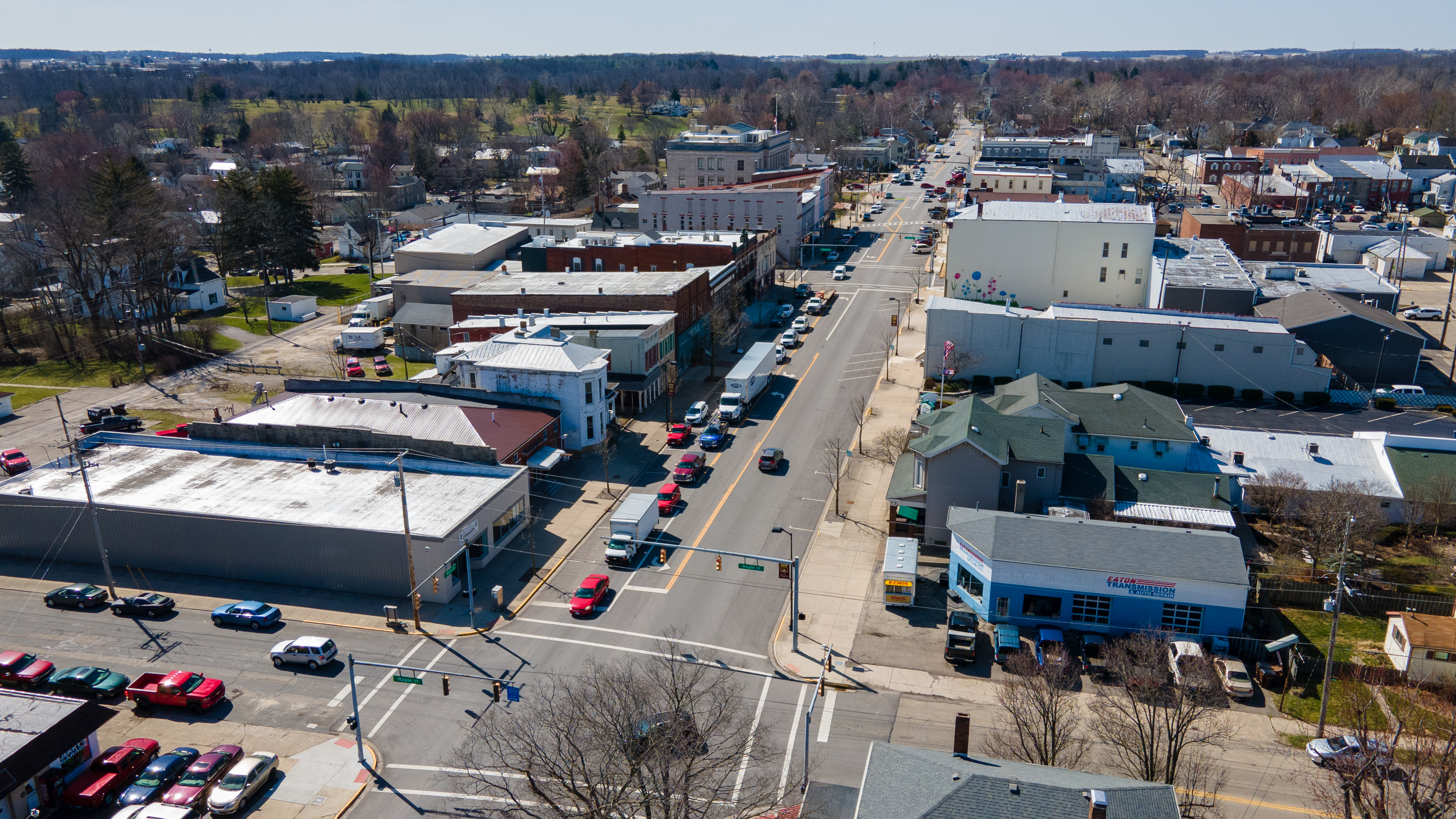
- Downtown Eaton

- Seal
- Motto: "We're all in this together!"
- Interactive map of Eaton, Ohio
- Location within Ohio Location within the United States
- Coordinates: 39°44′51″N 84°38′2″W
- Country: United States
- State: Ohio
- County: Preble

Government
  - Mayor: Joe Renner
  - Vice Mayor: Dave Kirsch

Area
  - Total: 6.44 sq mi (16.67 km^{2})
  - Land: 6.43 sq mi (16.65 km^{2})
  - Water: 0.0077 sq mi (0.02 km^{2}) 0.16%
- Elevation: 1,040 ft (320 m)

Population (2020)
  - Total: 8,375
  - Estimate (2023): 8,301
  - Density: 1,303.1/sq mi (503.12/km^{2})
- Time zone: UTC−4 (EST)
  - Summer (DST): UTC−4 (EDT)
- Zip code: 45320
- Area codes: 937, 326
- FIPS code: 39-24234
- GNIS feature ID: 1086845
- Website: City website

Eaton is a city in and the county seat of Preble County, Ohio, United States. It is approximately 24 miles (39 km) west of Dayton. The population was 8,375 at the 2020 census.

== History ==
Eaton was founded and platted in 1806 by William Bruce. The village derives its name from William Eaton, the U.S. Consul General to Tunis from 1797–1803 and commander of U.S. military forces in First Barbary War. In addition to the city of Eaton and the county of Preble, various streets in Eaton (including Barron, Decatur, Israel, Wadsworth, and Somers) were named in honor of heroes of the First Barbary War and Second Barbary War.

The town grew quickly following its establishment. In 1846, the town first had 1000 inhabitants. This growth was primarily derived from the town's location at the strategic junction of two turnpikes. In 1849, Eaton was the site of a cholera outbreak. About half of the inhabitants fled; of the remaining 600 people, 120 died. In June 1859, a fire in Eaton destroyed thirteen of its primary business establishments. The total loss was estimated at $40,000 to $50,000. Caused by incendiaries, the fire scorched the courthouse and left it a brown color.

== Geography ==
According to the United States Census Bureau, the city has a total area of 6.20 square miles (16.06 km^{2}), of which 6.19 square miles (16.03 km^{2}) is land and 0.01 square miles (0.03 km^{2}) is water.

The city includes Crystal Lake and Seven Mile Creek. Parks include: Fort St. Clair, Water Works Park, 7-Mile Park, and Clarence Hook Memorial Park.

=== Climate ===
Climate data for Eaton, Ohio (1991–2020 normals, extremes 1956–present)
Month	Jan	Feb	Mar	Apr	May	Jun	Jul	Aug	Sep	Oct	Nov	Dec	Year
Record high °F (°C)	68 (20)	75 (24)	84 (29)	87 (31)	96 (36)	102 (39)	102 (39)	101 (38)	98 (37)	91 (33)	80 (27)	72 (22)	102 (39)
Mean maximum °F (°C)	58.2 (14.6)	62.6 (17.0)	72.0 (22.2)	80.0 (26.7)	86.7 (30.4)	91.2 (32.9)	92.0 (33.3)	91.4 (33.0)	90.4 (32.4)	82.4 (28.0)	70.3 (21.3)	61.5 (16.4)	94.1 (34.5)
Mean daily maximum °F (°C)	35.4 (1.9)	39.6 (4.2)	50.2 (10.1)	63.2 (17.3)	73.2 (22.9)	81.7 (27.6)	84.9 (29.4)	84.0 (28.9)	78.6 (25.9)	66.0 (18.9)	52.1 (11.2)	40.5 (4.7)	62.5 (16.9)
Daily mean °F (°C)	26.4 (−3.1)	29.5 (−1.4)	39.2 (4.0)	50.7 (10.4)	61.2 (16.2)	70.2 (21.2)	73.4 (23.0)	71.9 (22.2)	65.5 (18.6)	53.4 (11.9)	41.4 (5.2)	31.7 (−0.2)	51.2 (10.7)
Mean daily minimum °F (°C)	17.4 (−8.1)	19.3 (−7.1)	28.2 (−2.1)	38.2 (3.4)	49.3 (9.6)	58.6 (14.8)	61.8 (16.6)	59.8 (15.4)	52.5 (11.4)	40.9 (4.9)	30.7 (−0.7)	22.9 (−5.1)	40.0 (4.4)
Mean minimum °F (°C)	−3.4 (−19.7)	2.7 (−16.3)	12.4 (−10.9)	24.9 (−3.9)	35.3 (1.8)	46.6 (8.1)	52.9 (11.6)	51.0 (10.6)	40.4 (4.7)	28.7 (−1.8)	18.2 (−7.7)	7.3 (−13.7)	−6.2 (−21.2)
Record low °F (°C)	−37 (−38)	−20 (−29)	−11 (−24)	14 (−10)	25 (−4)	27 (−3)	42 (6)	38 (3)	20 (−7)	12 (−11)	−3 (−19)	−30 (−34)	−37 (−38)
Average precipitation inches (mm)	3.13 (80)	2.56 (65)	3.58 (91)	4.53 (115)	4.80 (122)	4.64 (118)	4.28 (109)	3.01 (76)	3.04 (77)	3.19 (81)	3.16 (80)	3.19 (81)	43.11 (1,095)
Average precipitation days (≥ 0.01 in)	12.4	11.1	12.6	14.0	14.1	12.7	11.5	8.7	8.8	10.2	10.9	12.4	139.4
Source: NOAA

== Demographics ==
Historical population
Census	Pop.	Note	%±
1820	255		—
1830	510		100.0%
1840	859		68.4%
1850	1,346		56.7%
1870	1,748		—
1880	2,143		22.6%
1890	2,934		36.9%
1900	3,155		7.5%
1910	3,187		1.0%
1920	3,210		0.7%
1930	3,347		4.3%
1940	3,552		6.1%
1950	4,242		19.4%
1960	5,034		18.7%
1970	6,020		19.6%
1980	6,839		13.6%
1990	7,396		8.1%
2000	8,133		10.0%
2010	8,407		3.4%
2020	8,375		−0.4%
2023 (est.)	8,301		−0.9%

=== 2020 census ===
As of the 2020 census, Eaton had a population of 8,375. The median age was 43.8 years. 21.3% of residents were under the age of 18 and 23.9% of residents were 65 years of age or older. For every 100 females there were 89.0 males, and for every 100 females age 18 and over there were 85.9 males age 18 and over.

96.0% of residents lived in urban areas, while 4.0% lived in rural areas.

There were 3,663 households in Eaton, of which 24.8% had children under the age of 18 living in them. Of all households, 39.7% were married-couple households, 18.3% were households with a male householder and no spouse or partner present, and 34.3% were households with a female householder and no spouse or partner present. About 36.1% of all households were made up of individuals and 18.3% had someone living alone who was 65 years of age or older.

There were 3,970 housing units, of which 7.7% were vacant. The homeowner vacancy rate was 3.0% and the rental vacancy rate was 5.5%.

Racial composition as of the 2020 census
Race	Number	Percent
White	7,774	92.8%
Black or African American	74	0.9%
American Indian and Alaska Native	15	0.2%
Asian	78	0.9%
Native Hawaiian and Other Pacific Islander	0	0.0%
Some other race	53	0.6%
Two or more races	381	4.5%
Hispanic or Latino (of any race)	99	1.2%

=== 2010 census ===
As of the census of 2010, there were 8,407 people, 3,486 households, and 2,181 families living in the city. The population density was 1,358.2 inhabitants per square mile (524.4/km^{2}). There were 3,903 housing units at an average density of 630.5 per square mile (243.4/km^{2}). The racial makeup of the city was 96.3% White, 0.6% African American, 0.2% Native American, 1.0% Asian, 0.5% from other races, and 1.5% from two or more races. Hispanic or Latino of any race were 0.8% of the population.

There were 3,486 households, of which 30.3% had children under the age of 18 living with them, 44.2% were married couples living together, 13.7% had a female householder with no husband present, 4.6% had a male householder with no wife present, and 37.4% were non-families. 32.7% of all households were made up of individuals, and 15.5% had someone living alone who was 65 years of age or older. The average household size was 2.33 and the average family size was 2.90.

The median age in the city was 40.4 years. 23.3% of residents were under the age of 18; 8% were between the ages of 18 and 24; 23.7% were from 25 to 44; 25.7% were from 45 to 64; and 19.1% were 65 years of age or older. The gender makeup of the city was 47.2% male and 52.8% female.

=== 2000 census ===
As of the census of 2000, there were 8,133 people, 3,274 households, and 2,183 families living in the city. The population density was 1,434.2 inhabitants per square mile (553.7/km^{2}). There were 3,467 housing units at an average density of 611.4 per square mile (236.1/km^{2}). The racial makeup of the city was 98.02% White, 0.39% African American, 0.09% Native American, 0.55% Asian, 0.02% Pacific Islander, 0.07% from other races, and 0.85% from two or more races. Hispanic or Latino of any race were 0.57% of the population.

There were 3,274 households, out of which 30.3% had children under the age of 18 living with them, 51.3% were married couples living together, 11.2% had a female householder with no husband present, and 33.3% were non-families. 29.1% of all households were made up of individuals, and 14.0% had someone living alone who was 65 years of age or older. The average household size was 2.37 and the average family size was 2.89.

In the city, the population was spread out, with 24.0% under the age of 18, 8.7% from 18 to 24, 27.5% from 25 to 44, 21.6% from 45 to 64, and 18.1% who were 65 years of age or older. The median age was 38 years. For every 100 females, there were 89.6 males. For every 100 females age 18 and over, there were 85.6 males.

The median income for a household in the city was $37,231, and the median income for a family was $42,241. Males had a median income of $32,404 versus $24,006 for females. The per capita income for the city was $16,771. About 5.8% of families and 8.7% of the population were below the poverty line, including 10.0% of those under age 18 and 9.5% of those age 65 or over.

== Arts and culture ==
Eaton hosts the annual Preble County Pork Festival, held the third full weekend each September, and the summer Preble County Fair.

Downtown Eaton is home to Preble Arts, the art center of Preble County Art Association.

Eaton has a branch and administrative offices of the Preble County District Library.

== Education ==
Eaton Community Schools operates two elementary schools, one middle school, and Eaton High School.

Edison State Community College operates a satellite campus in Eaton.

== Notable people ==
- Victor J. Banis, author often associated with the first wave of West Coast gay writing
- Deem Bristow, actor who voiced Doctor Eggman from 1998 to 2004
- Andrew L. Harris, one of the heroes of the Battle of Gettysburg during the American Civil War and 44th governor of Ohio (1906-1909)
- Jane LeCompte, novelist who has written over 20 romance novels under the name Jane Ashford
- Travis Miller, former Major League Baseball pitcher for the Minnesota Twins (1996-2002)
- William Stephens, 24th governor of California (1917-1923)
- Kent Vosler, diver in the 1976 Summer Olympics

== Sister cities ==
Eaton has a sister city arrangement with Rödental bei Coburg, Germany.
