= Preble County, Ohio =

County in Ohio, United States

- County
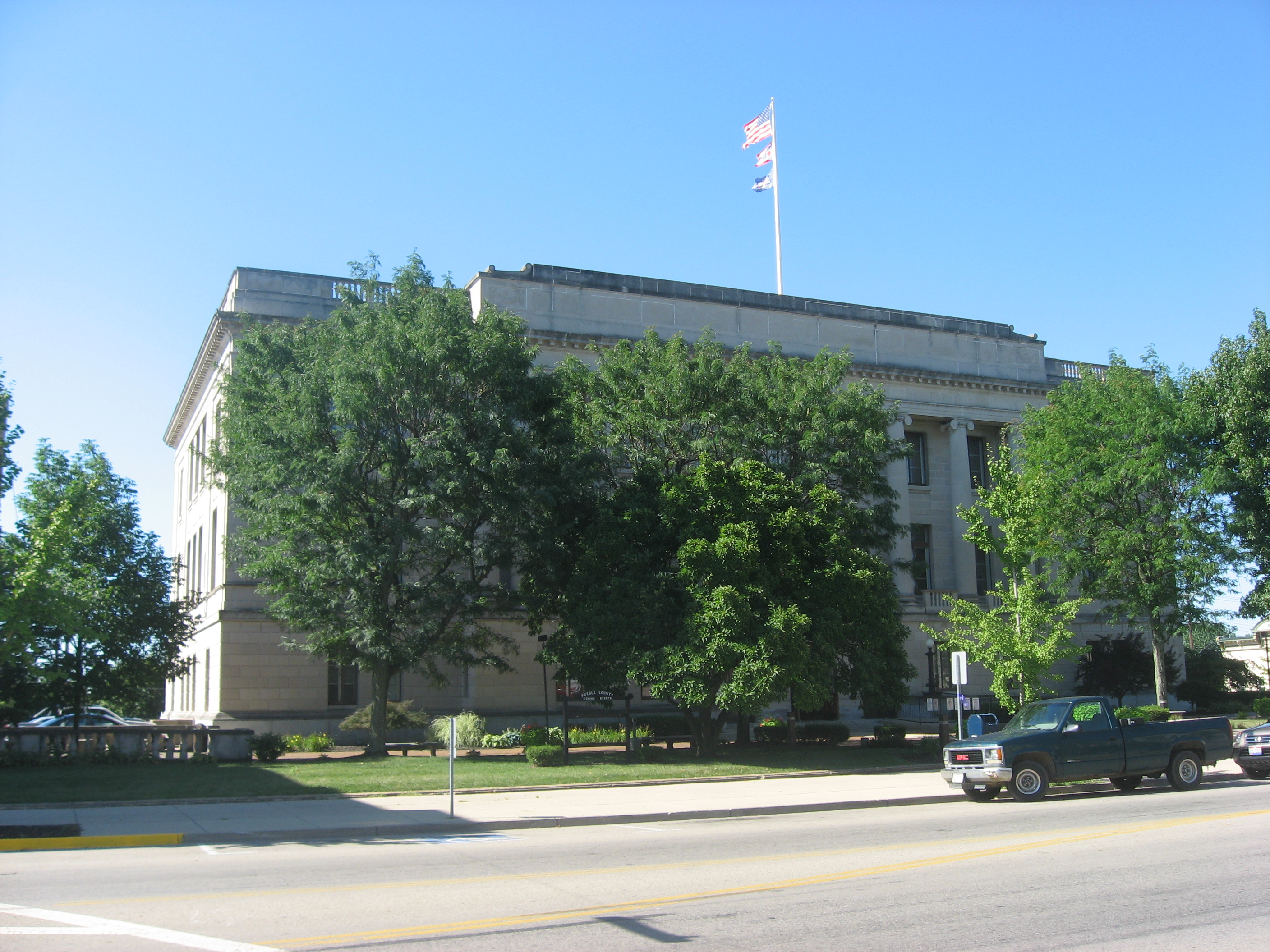
- Preble County Courthouse

- Flag Seal

- Location within the U.S. state of Ohio
- Coordinates: 39°44′N 84°39′W
- Country: United States
- State: Ohio
- Founded: March 1, 1808
- Named for: Edward Preble
- Seat: Eaton
- Largest city: Eaton

Area
  - Total: 426 sq mi (1,100 km^{2})
  - Land: 424 sq mi (1,100 km^{2})
  - Water: 2.3 sq mi (6.0 km^{2}) 0.5%

Population (2020)
  - Total: 40,999
  - Estimate (2025): 40,664 ▼
  - Density: 96/sq mi (37/km^{2})
- Time zone: UTC−5 (Eastern)
  - Summer (DST): UTC−4 (EDT)
- Congressional district: 8th
- Website: www.prebco.org

Preble County (/ˈprɛbəl/ PREH-bəl) is a county located in the U.S. state of Ohio. As of the 2020 census, the population was 40,999, down 3.0% from the 2010 census population of 42,270. Its county seat is Eaton. The county was formed on February 15, 1808, from portions of Butler and Montgomery Counties. It is named for Edward Preble, a naval officer who fought in the American Revolutionary War and against the Barbary Pirates.

== Major highways ==
- I-70
- US 35
- US 40
- US 127
- SR 121
- SR 122
- SR 177
- SR 320
- SR 503
- SR 725
- SR 725
- SR 726
- SR 732
- SR 744

== Geography ==
According to the U.S. Census Bureau, the county has a total area of 426 square miles (1,100 km^{2}), of which 424 square miles (1,100 km^{2}) is land and 2.3 square miles (6.0 km^{2}) (0.5%) is water.

=== Adjacent counties ===
- Darke County (north)
- Montgomery County (east)
- Butler County (south)
- Union County, Indiana (southwest)
- Wayne County, Indiana (northwest)

=== Rivers and streams ===
- Little Four Mile Creek
- Harker's Run
- Seven Mile Creek
- Twin Creek
- Price Creek
- Goose Creek
- Pottinger Run

== Demographics ==
Historical population
Census	Pop.	Note	%±
1810	3,304		—
1820	10,237		209.8%
1830	16,291		59.1%
1840	19,482		19.6%
1850	21,736		11.6%
1860	21,820		0.4%
1870	21,809		−0.1%
1880	24,533		12.5%
1890	23,421		−4.5%
1900	23,713		1.2%
1910	23,834		0.5%
1920	23,238		−2.5%
1930	22,455		−3.4%
1940	23,329		3.9%
1950	27,081		16.1%
1960	32,498		20.0%
1970	34,719		6.8%
1980	38,223		10.1%
1990	40,113		4.9%
2000	42,337		5.5%
2010	42,270		−0.2%
2020	40,999		−3.0%
2025 (est.)	40,664	▼	−0.8%
U.S. Decennial Census; 1790–1960 1900–1990; 1990–2000 2020

=== 2020 census ===
As of the 2020 census, the county had a population of 40,999 and a median age of 43.4 years. 22.6% of residents were under the age of 18 and 20.5% of residents were 65 years of age or older. For every 100 females there were 98.6 males, and for every 100 females age 18 and over there were 97.4 males age 18 and over.

The racial makeup of the county was 94.8% White, 0.5% Black or African American, 0.2% American Indian and Alaska Native, 0.4% Asian, <0.1% Native Hawaiian and Pacific Islander, 0.4% from some other race, and 3.7% from two or more races. Hispanic or Latino residents of any race comprised 0.9% of the population.

23.7% of residents lived in urban areas, while 76.3% lived in rural areas.

There were 16,412 households in the county, of which 28.6% had children under the age of 18 living in them. Of all households, 52.1% were married-couple households, 17.6% were households with a male householder and no spouse or partner present, and 23.1% were households with a female householder and no spouse or partner present. About 26.5% of all households were made up of individuals and 13.0% had someone living alone who was 65 years of age or older.

There were 18,093 housing units, of which 9.3% were vacant. Among occupied housing units, 76.7% were owner-occupied and 23.3% were renter-occupied. The homeowner vacancy rate was 1.5% and the rental vacancy rate was 7.2%.

=== Racial and ethnic composition ===
Preble County, Ohio – Racial and ethnic composition Note: the US Census treats Hispanic/Latino as an ethnic category. This table excludes Latinos from the racial categories and assigns them to a separate category. Hispanics/Latinos may be of any race.
Race / ethnicity (NH = Non-Hispanic)	Pop 1980	Pop 1990	Pop 2000	Pop 2010	Pop 2020	% 1980	% 1990	% 2000	% 2010	% 2020
White alone (NH)	37,896	39,746	41,577	41,088	38,700	99.14%	99.09%	98.20%	97.20%	94.39%
Black or African American alone (NH)	139	141	135	177	182	0.36%	0.35%	0.32%	0.42%	0.44%
Native American or Alaska Native alone (NH)	30	49	84	82	84	0.08%	0.12%	0.20%	0.19%	0.20%
Asian alone (NH)	33	62	109	170	162	0.09%	0.15%	0.26%	0.40%	0.40%
Native Hawaiian or Pacific Islander alone (NH)	x	x	2	2	4	x	x	0.00%	0.00%	0.01%
Other race alone (NH)	30	10	10	39	98	0.08%	0.02%	0.02%	0.09%	0.24%
Mixed race or Multiracial (NH)	x	x	239	458	1,383	x	x	0.56%	1.08%	3.37%
Hispanic or Latino (any race)	95	105	181	254	386	0.25%	0.26%	0.43%	0.60%	0.94%
Total	38,223	40,113	42,337	42,270	40,999	100.00%	100.00%	100.00%	100.00%	100.00%

=== 2010 census ===
As of the 2010 United States census, there were 42,270 people, 16,341 households, and 11,867 families living in the county. The population density was 99.7 inhabitants per square mile (38.5/km^{2}). There were 17,888 housing units at an average density of 42.2 units per square mile (16.3 units/km^{2}). The racial makeup of the county was 97.6% white, 0.4% black or African American, 0.4% Asian, 0.2% American Indian, 0.2% from other races, and 1.2% from two or more races. Those of Hispanic or Latino origin made up 0.6% of the population. In terms of ancestry, 34.3% were German, 14.6% were Irish, 12.7% were American, and 11.5% were English.

Of the 16,341 households, 32.7% had children under the age of 18 living with them, 57.5% were married couples living together, 10.1% had a female householder with no husband present, 27.4% were non-families, and 23.2% of all households were made up of individuals. The average household size was 2.56 and the average family size was 2.99. The median age was 40.9 years.

The median income for a household in the county was $49,780 and the median income for a family was $57,711. Males had a median income of $46,383 versus $30,876 for females. The per capita income for the county was $23,290. About 6.3% of families and 9.4% of the population were below the poverty line, including 13.1% of those under age 18 and 6.8% of those age 65 or over.

=== 2000 census ===
As of the census of 2000, there were 42,337 people, 16,001 households, and 12,144 families living in the county. The population density was 100 inhabitants per square mile (39/km^{2}). There were 17,186 housing units at an average density of 40 units per square mile (15/km^{2}). The racial makeup of the county was 98.47% White, 0.32% Black or African American, 0.21% Native American, 0.26% Asian, 0.02% Pacific Islander, 0.11% from other races, and 0.60% from two or more races. 0.43% of the population were Hispanic or Latino of any race.

There were 16,001 households, out of which 34.20% had children under the age of 18 living with them, 63.50% were married couples living together, 8.50% had a female householder with no husband present, and 24.10% were non-families. 20.60% of all households were made up of individuals, and 8.90% had someone living alone who was 65 years of age or older. The average household size was 2.62 and the average family size was 3.02.

The median age in the county was 38 years. 26.00% of residents were under the age of 18, 7.70% were aged from 18 to 24, 28.70% from 25 to 44, 24.40% from 45 to 64, and 13.20% were 65 years of age or older. For every 100 females there were 99.30 males. For every 100 females age 18 and over, there were 95.70 males.

The median income for a household in the county was $42,093, and the median income for a family was $47,547. Males had a median income of $35,313 versus $23,573 for females. The per capita income for the county was $18,444. About 4.50% of families and 6.10% of the population were below the poverty line, including 7.00% of those under age 18 and 6.10% of those age 65 or over.

== Politics ==
Preble County votes for Republicans more often than Democrats in presidential elections. It only supported a Democrat for president five times in the 20th century, the last being Lyndon Johnson in 1964. Jimmy Carter is the last Democrat to tally as much as 40 percent of the vote.

United States presidential election results for Preble County, Ohio
Year	Republican		Democratic		Third party(ies)	
Year	No.	%	No.	%	No.	%
1856	2,249	55.08%	1,561	38.23%	273	6.69%
1860	2,596	59.24%	1,733	39.55%	53	1.21%
1864	2,687	61.25%	1,700	38.75%	0	0.00%
1868	2,738	58.93%	1,908	41.07%	0	0.00%
1872	2,715	56.14%	2,101	43.44%	20	0.41%
1876	3,004	53.46%	2,551	45.40%	64	1.14%
1880	3,183	53.02%	2,711	45.16%	109	1.82%
1884	3,178	51.21%	2,817	45.39%	211	3.40%
1888	3,157	49.06%	2,966	46.09%	312	4.85%
1892	2,957	49.39%	2,699	45.08%	331	5.53%
1896	3,300	49.56%	3,254	48.87%	105	1.58%
1900	3,548	51.43%	3,206	46.47%	145	2.10%
1904	3,647	54.85%	2,792	41.99%	210	3.16%
1908	3,519	50.99%	3,247	47.05%	135	1.96%
1912	2,135	34.67%	2,859	46.43%	1,164	18.90%
1916	2,881	45.16%	3,387	53.09%	112	1.76%
1920	6,258	55.72%	4,933	43.92%	40	0.36%
1924	5,676	56.75%	4,033	40.33%	292	2.92%
1928	6,693	65.21%	3,513	34.23%	57	0.56%
1932	5,205	44.77%	6,221	53.51%	199	1.71%
1936	5,593	45.51%	6,366	51.80%	331	2.69%
1940	6,511	53.17%	5,735	46.83%	0	0.00%
1944	6,609	57.56%	4,872	42.44%	0	0.00%
1948	5,837	55.51%	4,656	44.28%	23	0.22%
1952	8,405	63.48%	4,836	36.52%	0	0.00%
1956	8,099	63.91%	4,574	36.09%	0	0.00%
1960	8,802	61.69%	5,467	38.31%	0	0.00%
1964	5,839	43.53%	7,574	56.47%	0	0.00%
1968	6,544	52.63%	3,817	30.70%	2,073	16.67%
1972	8,993	70.29%	3,472	27.14%	330	2.58%
1976	6,654	52.20%	5,850	45.89%	243	1.91%
1980	8,376	56.89%	5,416	36.79%	931	6.32%
1984	11,065	71.84%	4,198	27.25%	140	0.91%
1988	10,297	66.95%	4,937	32.10%	147	0.96%
1992	8,023	44.33%	5,557	30.71%	4,518	24.96%
1996	8,139	47.50%	6,611	38.59%	2,383	13.91%
2000	11,176	61.52%	6,375	35.09%	615	3.39%
2004	13,734	65.01%	7,274	34.43%	119	0.56%
2008	13,562	64.43%	6,999	33.25%	488	2.32%
2012	13,535	66.92%	6,211	30.71%	479	2.37%
2016	15,446	74.69%	4,325	20.91%	910	4.40%
2020	17,022	77.94%	4,493	20.57%	325	1.49%
2024	17,146	78.77%	4,343	19.95%	277	1.27%

United States Senate election results for Preble County, Ohio1
Year	Republican		Democratic		Third party(ies)	
Year	No.	%	No.	%	No.	%
2024	15,806	73.41%	4,940	22.94%	785	3.65%

== Education ==
=== Public school districts ===
School districts include:

- Union County College Corner Joint School District (the Patriots) (this portion is shown in the U.S. Census documents as being in the "College Corner Local School District")
  - College Corner Union School (grades K-5) is physically located in both Ohio and Indiana (the state line runs through the middle of the building) and serves students from both College Corner, Ohio, and West College Corner, Indiana. After finishing fifth grade, Preble County students attend Union County Middle School and Union County High School, both located across the state line in Liberty, Indiana.
- Eaton Community Schools
  - Eaton High School, Eaton (the Eagles)
- Edgewood City School District
- National Trail Local School District
  - National Trail High School, New Paris (the Blazers)
- Preble Shawnee Local School District
  - Preble Shawnee High School, Camden (the Arrows)
- Talawanda City School District
- Tri-County North Local School District
  - Tri-County North High School, Lewisburg (the Panthers)
- Twin Valley Community Local School District
  - Twin Valley South High School, West Alexandria (the Panthers)
- Valley View Local School District

=== Higher education ===
- Sinclair Community College
  - Preble County Learning Center, Eaton

== Communities ==
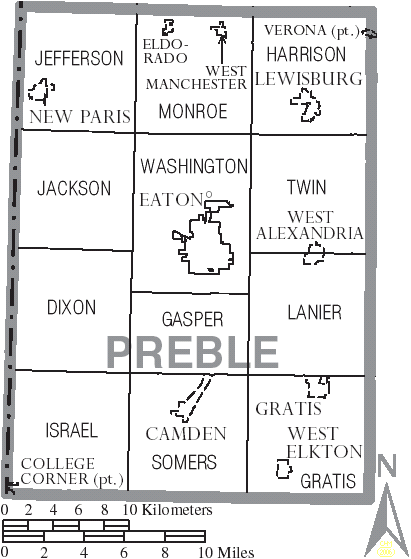
Map of Preble County, Ohio With Municipal and Township Labels

=== City ===
- Eaton (county seat)

=== Villages ===
- College Corner
- Camden
- Eldorado
- Gratis
- Lewisburg
- New Paris
- Verona
- West Alexandria
- West Elkton
- West Manchester

=== Townships ===
- Dixon
- Gasper
- Gratis
- Harrison
- Israel
- Jackson
- Jefferson
- Lanier
- Monroe
- Somers
- Twin
- Washington

=== Census-designated place ===
- Lake Lakengren

=== Unincorporated communities ===
- Brennersville
- Brinley
- Browns
- Campbellstown
- Cedar Springs
- Dadsville
- Ebenezer
- Enterprise
- Fairhaven
- Gettysburg
- Greenbush
- Hamburg
- Ingomar
- Morning Sun
- New Hope
- New Lexington
- New Westville
- Sampleville
- Sugar Valley
- Talawanda Springs
- West Florence
- West Sonora

== Notable residents ==
- Sherwood Anderson - writer
- Victor J. Banis - "the godfather of modern popular gay fiction."
- Benjamin Hanby - wrote the Christmas carol "Up On The House Top" while living in Preble County.
- Andrew L. Harris - Civil War general and former governor of Ohio.
- William Stephens - former governor of California.
- JD Vance - 50th and current Vice President of the United States.

== See also ==
- National Register of Historic Places listings in Preble County, Ohio
- Preble County District Library
