= Eldorado, Ohio =

- Village
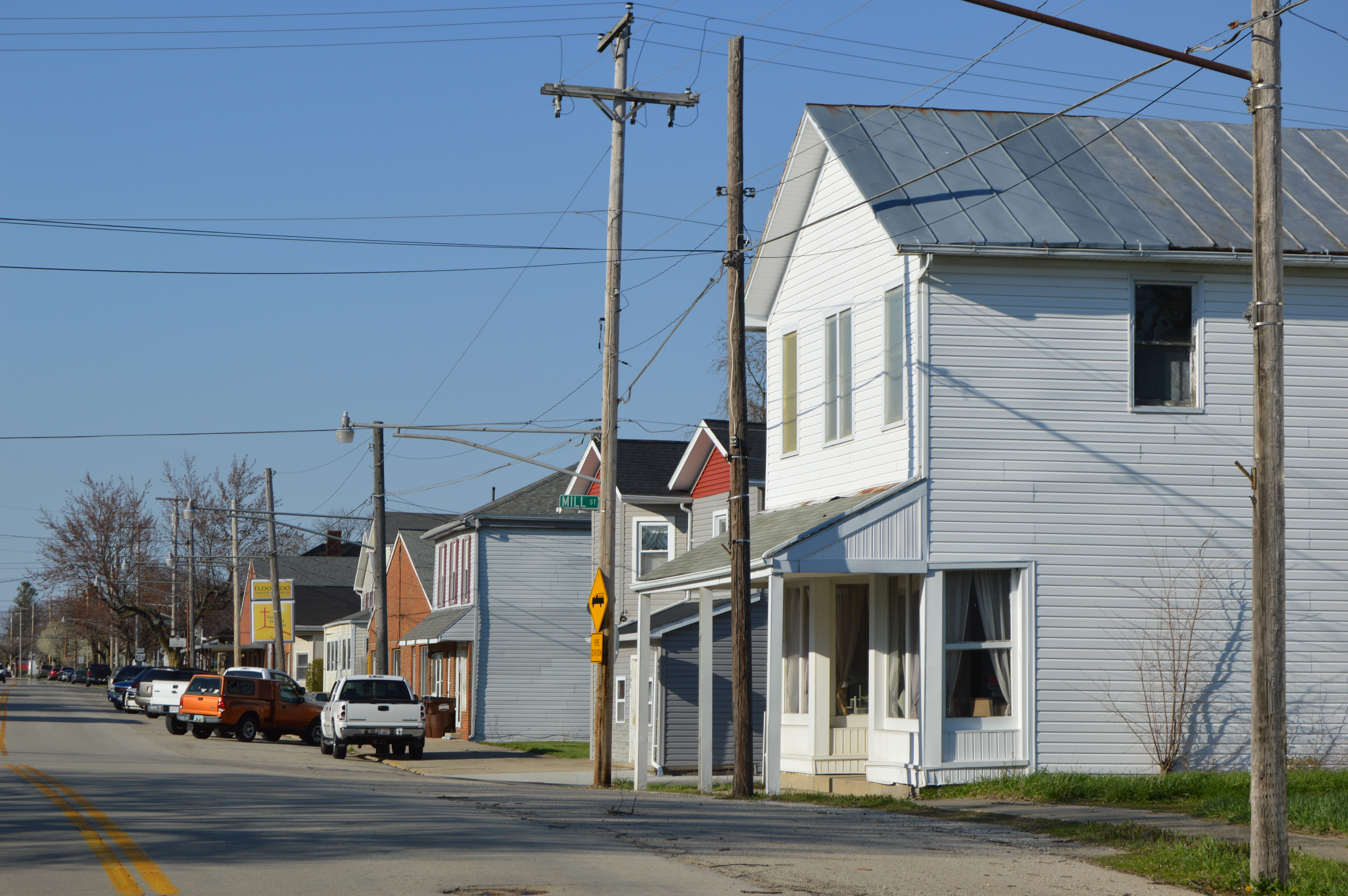
- Main Street

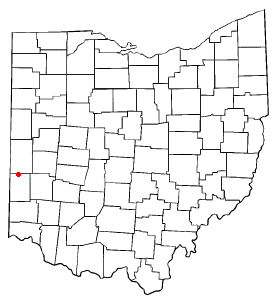
- Location of Eldorado, Ohio

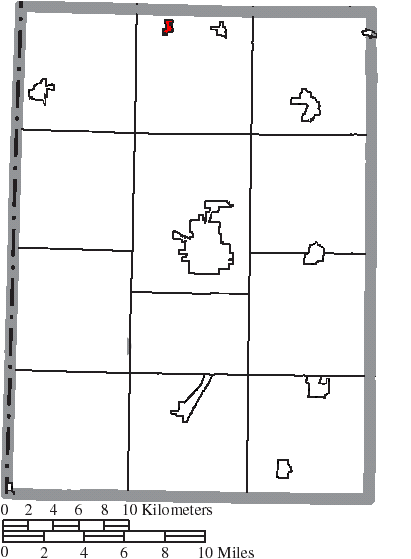
- Location of Eldorado in Preble County
- Coordinates: 39°54′15″N 84°40′31″W
- Country: United States
- State: Ohio
- County: Preble

Area
  - Total: 0.23 sq mi (0.59 km^{2})
  - Land: 0.23 sq mi (0.59 km^{2})
  - Water: 0 sq mi (0.00 km^{2})
- Elevation: 1,142 ft (348 m)

Population (2020)
  - Total: 458
  - Estimate (2023): 453
  - Density: 2,003.4/sq mi (773.51/km^{2})
- Time zone: UTC-5 (Eastern (EST))
  - Summer (DST): UTC-4 (EDT)
- ZIP code: 45321
- Area codes: 937, 326
- FIPS code: 39-24766
- GNIS feature ID: 2398796

Eldorado (/ˌɛldəˈreɪdoʊ/ EL-də-RAY-doh) is a village in Preble County, Ohio, United States. The population was 458 at the 2020 census. It is part of the Dayton Metropolitan Statistical Area.

== Geography ==
According to the United States Census Bureau, the village has a total area of 0.23 square miles (0.60 km^{2}), all land.

== Demographics ==
Historical population
Census	Pop.	Note	%±
1880	337		—
1890	365		8.3%
1900	358		−1.9%
1910	321		−10.3%
1920	322		0.3%
1930	292		−9.3%
1940	311		6.5%
1950	364		17.0%
1960	449		23.4%
1970	483		7.6%
1980	509		5.4%
1990	549		7.9%
2000	543		−1.1%
2010	509		−6.3%
2020	458		−10.0%
2023 (est.)	453	▼	−1.1%
U.S. Decennial Census

=== 2010 census ===
As of the census of 2010, there were 509 people, 196 households, and 141 families living in the village. The population density was 2,213.0 inhabitants per square mile (854.4/km^{2}). There were 223 housing units at an average density of 969.6 per square mile (374.4/km^{2}). The racial makeup of the village was 99.0% White, 0.6% Asian, 0.2% from other races, and 0.2% from two or more races. Hispanic or Latino of any race were 0.2% of the population.

There were 196 households, of which 35.7% had children under the age of 18 living with them, 55.1% were married couples living together, 9.7% had a female householder with no husband present, 7.1% had a male householder with no wife present, and 28.1% were non-families. 20.9% of all households were made up of individuals, and 8.1% had someone living alone who was 65 years of age or older. The average household size was 2.60 and the average family size was 3.06.

The median age in the village was 39.2 years. 27.1% of residents were under the age of 18; 6.5% were between the ages of 18 and 24; 26.9% were from 25 to 44; 27.6% were from 45 to 64; and 12% were 65 years of age or older. The gender makeup of the village was 49.5% male and 50.5% female.

=== 2000 census ===
As of the census of 2000, there were 543 people, 212 households, and 156 families living in the village. The population density was 2,375.8 inhabitants per square mile (917.3/km^{2}). There were 225 housing units at an average density of 984.4 per square mile (380.1/km^{2}). The racial makeup of the village was 99.63% White, and 0.37% from two or more races. Hispanic or Latino of any race were 0.18% of the population.

There were 212 households, out of which 38.2% had children under the age of 18 living with them, 61.3% were married couples living together, 7.5% had a female householder with no husband present, and 26.4% were non-families. 24.1% of all households were made up of individuals, and 12.3% had someone living alone who was 65 years of age or older. The average household size was 2.56 and the average family size was 2.99.

In the village, the population was spread out, with 28.2% under the age of 18, 7.0% from 18 to 24, 31.5% from 25 to 44, 23.8% from 45 to 64, and 9.6% who were 65 years of age or older. The median age was 35 years. For every 100 females there were 93.9 males. For every 100 females age 18 and over, there were 89.3 males.

The median income for a household in the village was $42,396, and the median income for a family was $45,694. Males had a median income of $32,813 versus $23,750 for females. The per capita income for the village was $17,259. About 0.6% of families and 2.3% of the population were below the poverty line, including 4.4% of those under age 18 and none of those age 65 or over.

== Education ==
The National Trail Local School District serves students from Eldorado and surrounding Monroe Township. Eldorado also has a public library, a branch of the Preble County District Library.
