= Ohio State Route 503 =

State highway in southwestern Ohio, US

State Route 503

Route information
- Maintained by ODOT
- Length: 40.53 mi (65.23 km)
- Existed: 1937–present

Major junctions
- South end: US 127 in Seven Mile
- US 35 in West Alexandria; I-70 in Lewisburg; US 40 in Lewisburg
- North end: SR 121 in Wayne Lakes

Location
- Country: United States
- State: Ohio
- Counties: Butler, Preble, Darke

Highway system
- Ohio State Highway System; Interstate; US; State; Scenic
← SR 502	→ SR 504

State Route 503 (SR 503) is a north–south state highway in the southwestern quadrant of the U.S. state of Ohio. The southern terminus of SR 503 is at U.S. Route 127 (US 127) in Seven Mile. Its northern terminus is at a T-intersection with SR 121 on the eastern limits of the village of Wayne Lakes.

== Route description ==
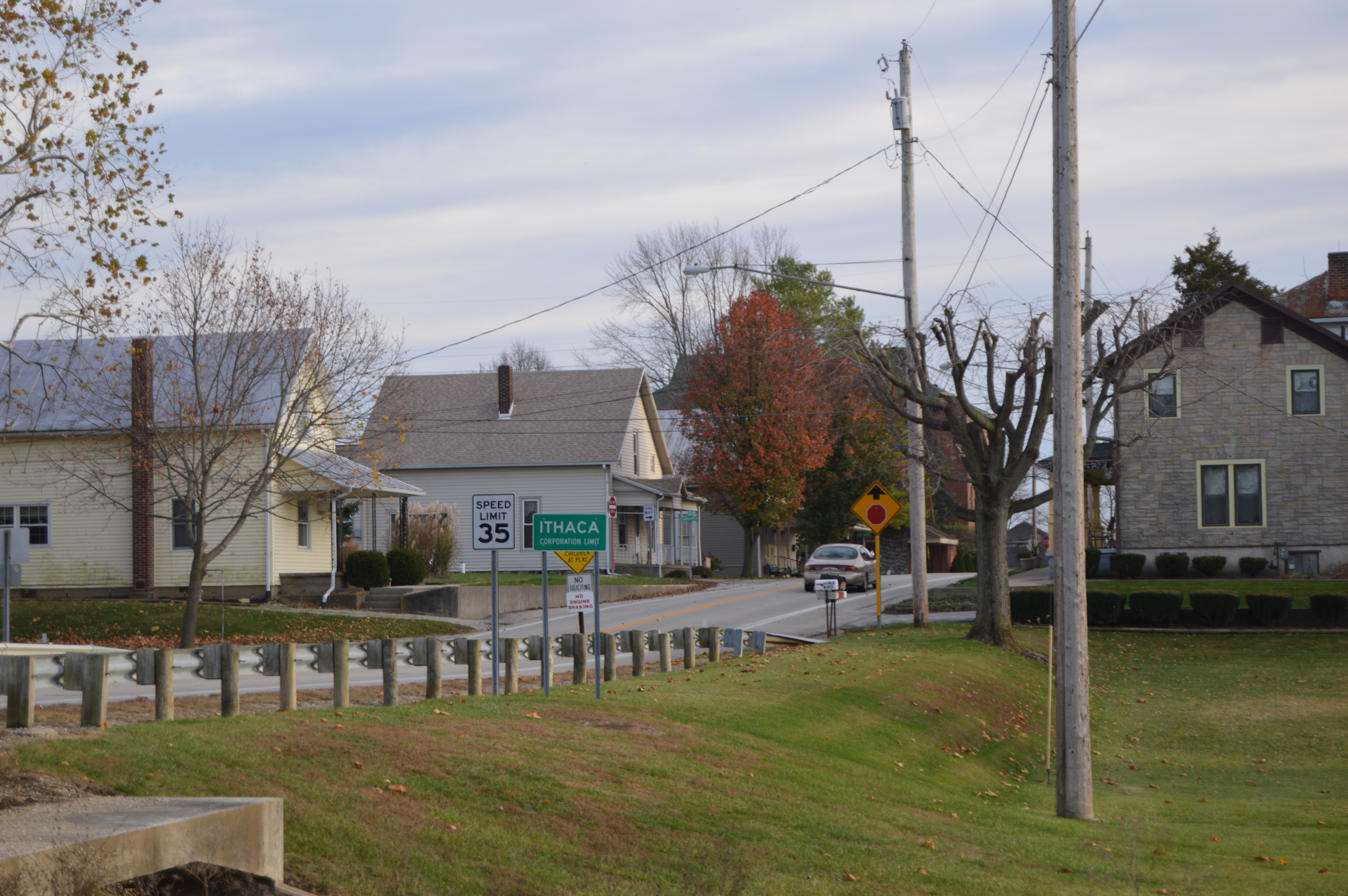
Entering Ithaca from the north

Along its way, SR 503 travels through northern Butler County, eastern Preble County and southern Darke County. There are no segments of SR 503 that are included as a part of the National Highway System, a network of highways identified as being most important for the economy, mobility and defense of the nation.

== History ==
The SR 503 designation was assigned in 1937. The highway was established along the routing that it maintains to this day between US 127 in Seven Mile and SR 121 in Wayne Lakes. No changes of major significance have taken place to the routing of the highway since its inception.

== Major intersections ==
County	Location	mi	km	Destinations	Notes
Butler	Seven Mile	0.00	0.00	US 127 (Main Street) / Mill Road – Hamilton	
Butler	Wayne Township	0.97	1.56	SR 73 (Trenton Oxford Road) – Trenton, Oxford	
Butler	Wayne Township	4.61	7.42	SR 744 (Somerville Jacksonburg Road) – Somerville, Jacksonburg	
Preble	Gratis	12.19	19.62	SR 725 (South Street)	
Preble	Gratis	12.26	19.73	SR 122 (Franklin Street)	
Preble	West Alexandria	19.16	30.84	US 35 (Dayton Street)	
Preble	Harrison Township	25.60	41.20	I-70 – Columbus, Indianapolis	Exit 14 (I-70)
Preble	Lewisburg	26.83	43.18	US 40 (Cumberland Street)	
Darke	Ithaca	32.71	52.64	SR 722 east (Cross Street)	Southern end of SR 722 concurrency
Darke	Twin Township	32.85	52.87	SR 722 west	Northern end of SR 722 concurrency
Darke	Butler Township	38.94	62.67	US 127 – Castine, Greenville	
Darke	Wayne Lakes	40.53	65.23	SR 121 – New Madison, Fort Jefferson, Greenville	
1.000 mi = 1.609 km; 1.000 km = 0.621 mi: Concurrency terminus
