= Ohio State Route 722 =

State highway in Darke County, Ohio, US

State Route 722

Route information
- Maintained by ODOT
- Length: 16.74 mi (26.94 km)
- Existed: 1937–present

Major junctions
- West end: SR 121 near New Madison
- US 127 in Castine
- East end: SR 49 / CR 21 near Gordon

Location
- Country: United States
- State: Ohio
- Counties: Darke

Highway system
- Ohio State Highway System; Interstate; US; State; Scenic
← SR 721	→ SR 723

State Route 722 (SR 722) is an east–west state highway in the western portion of the U.S. state of Ohio. The western terminus of SR 722 is at a T-intersection with SR 121 approximately 3.25 miles (5.23 km) southwest of New Madison. Its eastern terminus is at SR 49 nearly 3.75 miles (6.04 km) east of the village of Gordon.

== Route description ==
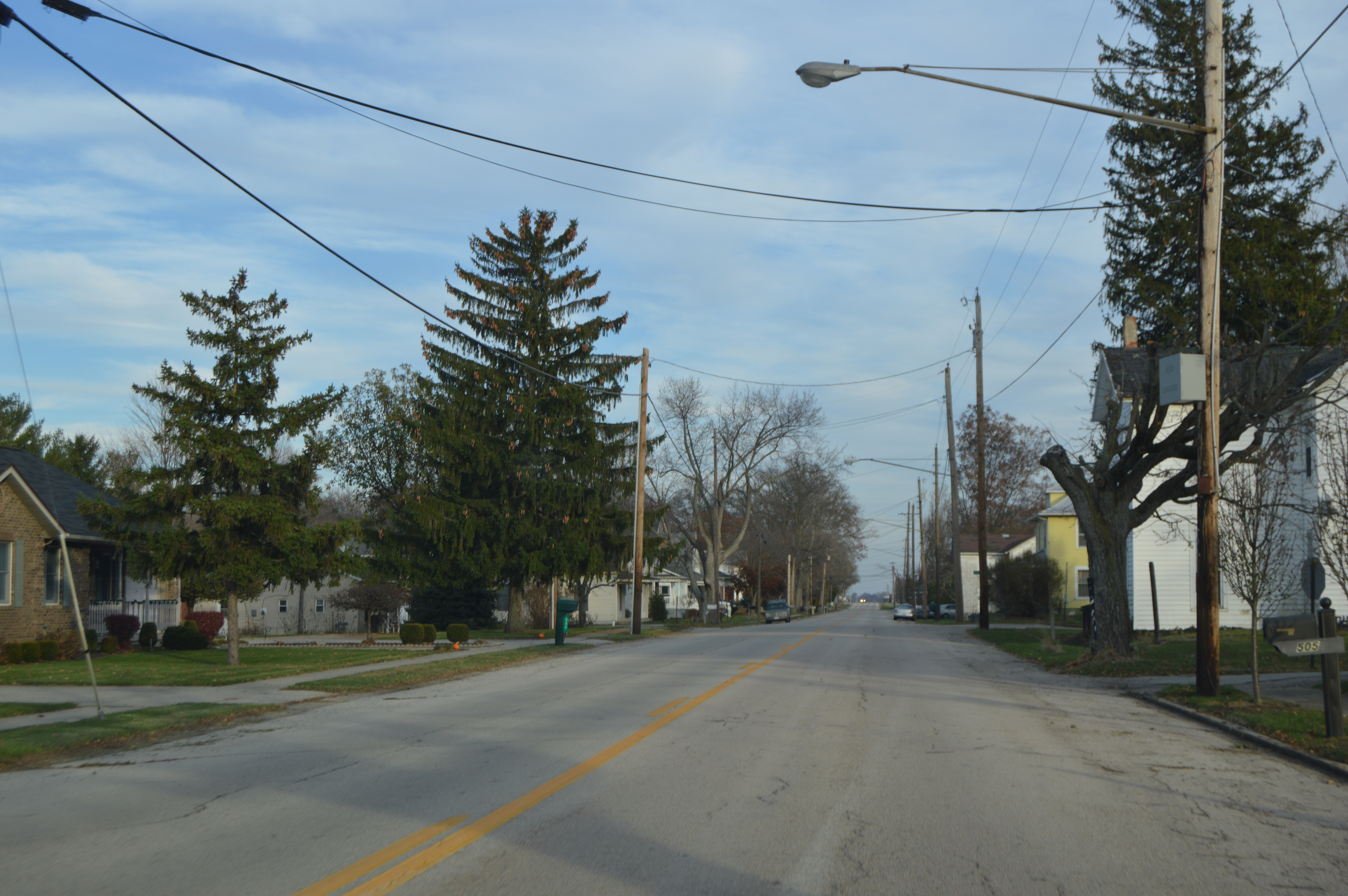
SR 722 is North Street in the village of Gordon

SR 722 traverses the southern portion of Darke County for its entire length. No portion of this highway is included within the National Highway System, a network of routes determined to be most important for the economy, mobility and defense of the nation.

== History ==
SR 722 was established in 1937. It was originally routed between US 127 in Castine and its present eastern terminus at SR 49 east of Gordon. Two years later, the highway was extended west to its current western terminus at SR 121 southwest of New Madison.

== Major intersections ==
The entire route is in Darke County.

Location	mi	km	Destinations	Notes
Harrison Township	0.00	0.00	SR 121	
Butler Township	2.56	4.12	SR 726	
Castine	6.28	10.11	US 127 (Main Street)	
Ithaca	10.16	16.35	SR 503 north	Western end of SR 503 concurrency
Ithaca	10.30	16.58	SR 503 south (Main Street) / Clark Road	Eastern end of SR 503 concurrency
Monroe Township	16.74	26.94	SR 49 / CR 21 (Castine-Gordon Road) – Dayton	
1.000 mi = 1.609 km; 1.000 km = 0.621 mi: Concurrency terminus
