= Christopher C. Walker House and Farm =

Historic house in Ohio, United States

- U.S. National Register of Historic Places
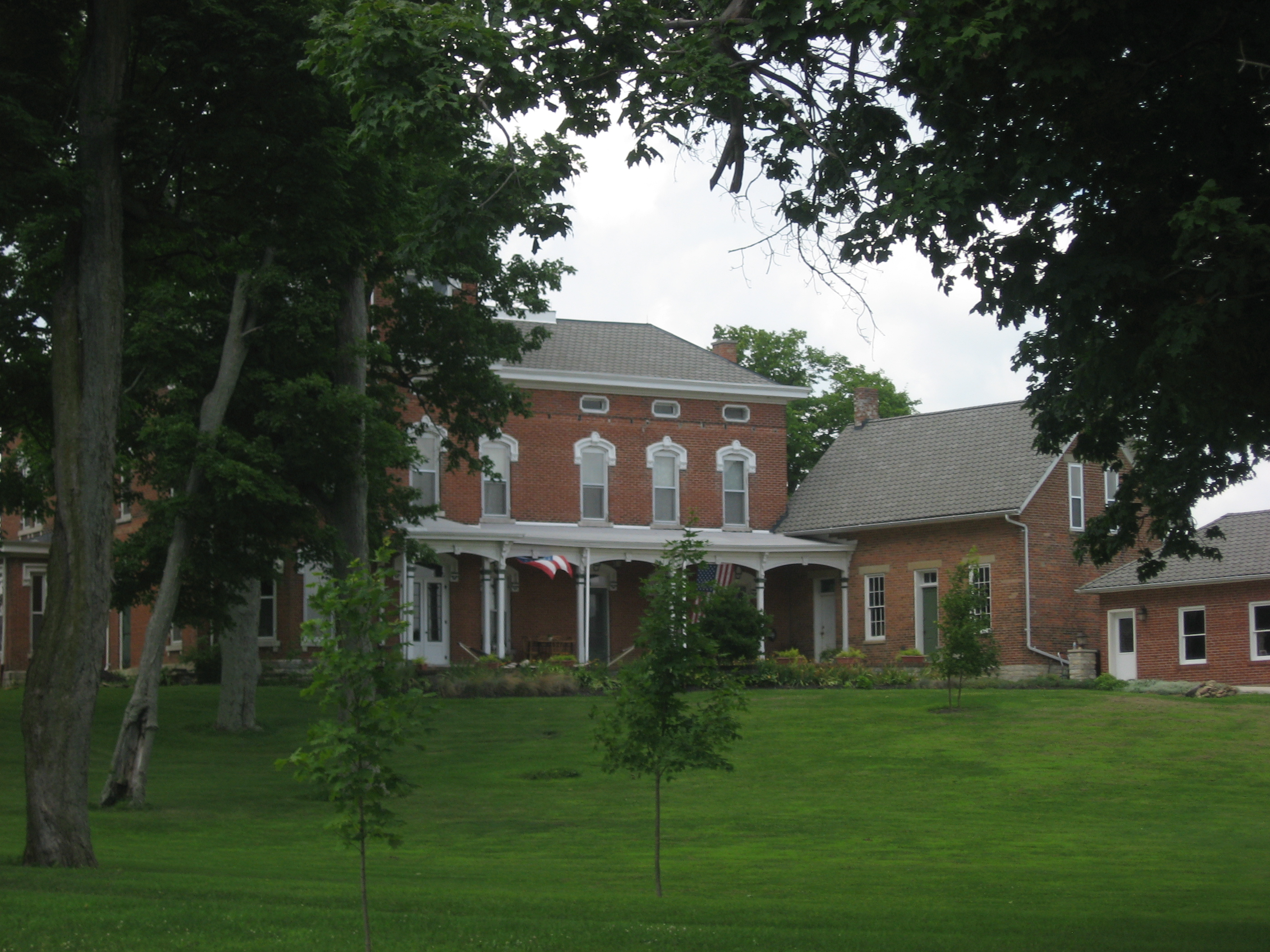
- Walker's farmhouse and sheds

- Location within Ohio Location within the United States
- Location: Harrison Township, Darke County
- Nearest city: New Madison, Ohio
- Coordinates: 39°56′58″N 84°44′10″W
- Area: 151.7 acres (61.4 ha)
- Built: 1879
- Architectural style: Second Empire, Italianate, Victorian
- NRHP reference No.: 82003561
- Added to NRHP: April 7, 1982

The Christopher C. Walker House and Farm is a historic farmstead in the far western part of the U.S. state of Ohio. Located southwest of the village of New Madison along State Route 121, it is composed of five buildings and one other structure spread out over an area of nearly 160 acres (65 ha).

== Christopher Walker ==
During the late nineteenth century, Christopher Walker was one of Darke County's leading farmers. Born in Baltimore County, Maryland in 1829, he moved to Darke County with his parents, who first settled in Butler Township. Beginning in 1851 and continuing through most of the rest of the decade, he participated in owning and running a local store in Braffettsville, which position he occupied through most of the rest of the decade; during this time, he married the former Mary Brawley. By 1858, Walker had become dissatisfied with storekeeping; he sold his interest in the store and began farming, purchasing the farm in Harrison Township near New Madison in 1862.

From his earliest years as an independent farmer, Walker was primarily a raiser of livestock: from 1862 to 1866, he was engaged with his brothers in distributing hogs, and after that business venture failed, he began to concentrate on producing his own livestock. By 1880, he had expanded his farm to approximately 625 acres (253 ha), divided between 75 acres (30 ha) in northern Preble County to the south, 150 acres (61 ha) elsewhere in Harrison Township, and 400 acres (160 ha) surrounding his farmhouse.

== Recognition ==
Two of the farm's buildings have been widely recognized: the 1879 barn and the 1884 house. Measuring 60 feet (18 m) by 48 feet (15 m), the barn was designed with an "L" shape to make stock raising more effective; one writer deemed it the best barn he had ever seen. Likewise, the farmhouse was built for the convenience of its residents: mixing the Victorian, Second Empire, and Italianate styles of architecture, it is dominated by a tower with a Mansard roof, and it sits atop a small hill overlooking State Route 121 to the north.

The Walker farm remains a local landmark to the present day, evoking a strong contrast between its ornate nineteenth-century architecture and the plain modern architecture of the farms around it. In 1982, the farm complex was placed on the National Register of Historic Places, both because of its well-preserved historic architecture and because of its contribution to local history. Key to its importance in local history is Walker's contribution to Darke County agriculture, as the farm buildings were a leading element of his livestock programs that made the county one of Ohio's foremost in hog raising.
