= Ohio State Route 726 =

State highway in western Ohio, US

State Route 726

Route information
- Maintained by ODOT
- Length: 14.21 mi (22.87 km)
- Existed: 1937–present

Major junctions
- South end: US 127 near Eaton
- US 40 near Eldorado
- North end: SR 121 in New Madison

Location
- Country: United States
- State: Ohio
- Counties: Darke, Preble

Highway system
- Ohio State Highway System; Interstate; US; State; Scenic
← SR 725	→ SR 727

State Route 726 (SR 726) is a north–south state highway in western Ohio, a U.S. state. The southern terminus of the state route is at a T-intersection with US 127 about 1 mile (1.6 km) north of the city limits of Eaton. The northern terminus of SR 726 is at a signalized intersection with SR 121 in downtown New Madison.

== Route description ==
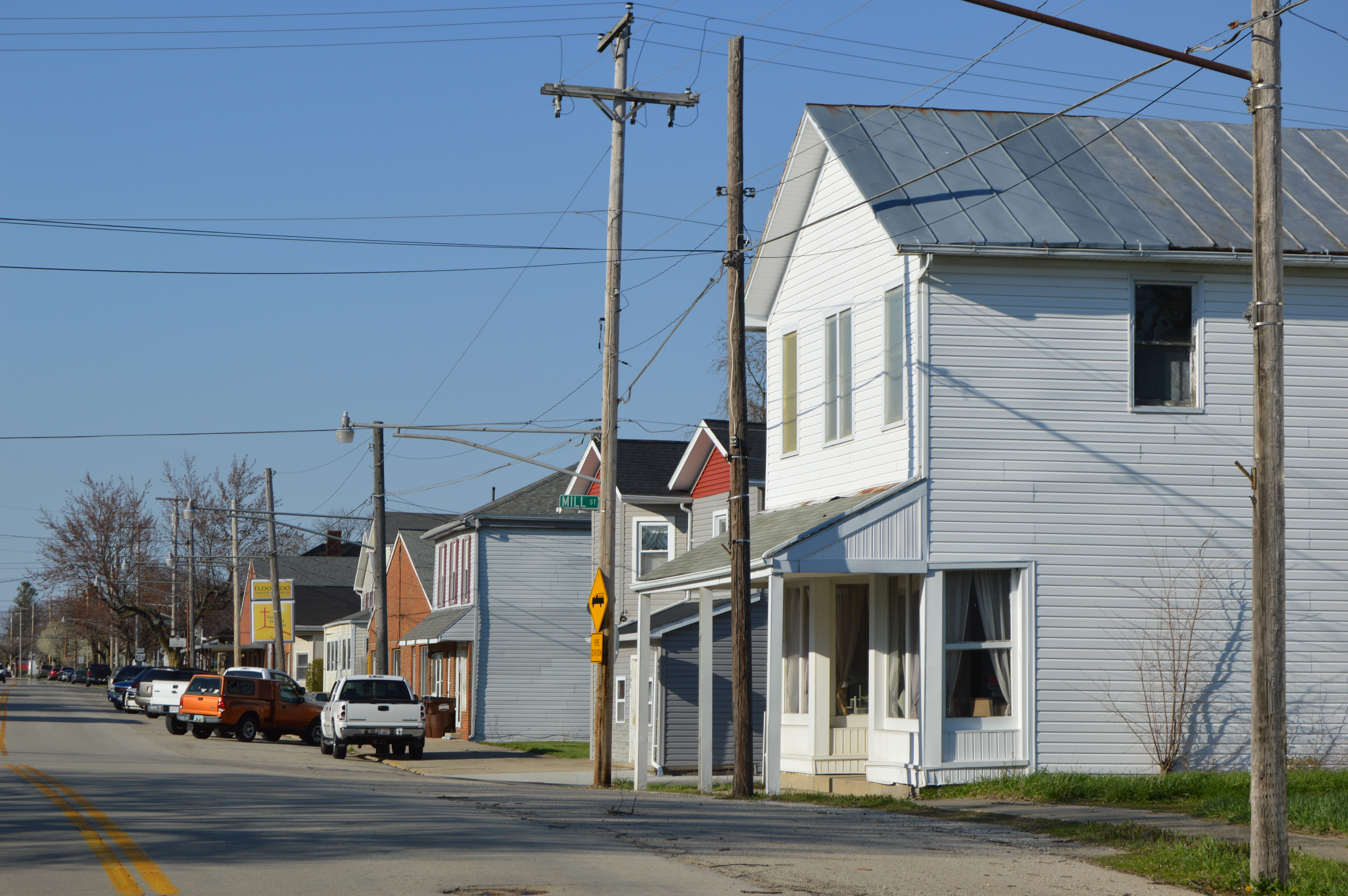
As Main Street in Eldorado

SR 726 runs through northern Preble County and southern Darke County. No portion of this highway is inclusive within the National Highway System.

== History ==
Created in 1937 along the alignment that it occupies to this day between US 127 and SR 121, SR 726 has not experienced any changes of major significance to its routing since inception.

== Major intersections ==
County	Location	mi	km	Destinations	Notes
Preble	Washington Township	0.00	0.00	US 127	
Preble	Monroe Township	4.83	7.77	US 40 (National Road) – Lewisburg, Richmond, IN	
Darke	Butler Township	11.41	18.36	SR 722	
Darke	New Madison	14.21	22.87	SR 121 (Main Street) / Washington Street	
1.000 mi = 1.609 km; 1.000 km = 0.621 mi
