= Ohio State Route 121 =

State highway in western Ohio, US

State Route 121

Route information
- Maintained by ODOT
- Length: 35.94 mi (57.84 km)
- Existed: 1924–present

Major junctions
- South end: SR 121 near New Paris
- US 36 near Greenville; US 127 near Greenville
- North end: SR 47 / SR 185 in Versailles

Location
- Country: United States
- State: Ohio
- Counties: Preble, Darke

Highway system
- Ohio State Highway System; Interstate; US; State; Scenic
← SR 120	→ SR 122

State Route 121 (SR 121) is a state highway in western Ohio. It starts at Indiana State Road 121 near New Paris, Ohio, and ends at State Route 47 and State Route 185 in Versailles, Ohio.

== Major intersections ==
County	Location	mi	km	Destinations	Notes
Preble	Jefferson Township	0.00	0.00	SR 121 – Richmond	Southern terminus at the state line
Preble	New Paris	1.36	2.19	SR 320	Northern terminus of SR 320
Darke	Harrison Township	7.71	12.41	SR 722	Western terminus of SR 722
Darke	New Madison	11.21	18.04	SR 726	Northern terminus of SR 726
Darke	Wayne Lakes	15.91	25.60	SR 503	
Darke	Neave Township	18.62	29.97	US 36	
Darke	Greenville	21.47	34.55	SR 49	Southern end of SR 49 concurrency
Darke	Greenville	22.46	36.15	SR 49 / SR 502	Northern end of SR 49 concurrency; Eastern terminus of SR 502
Darke	Greenville Township	24.81– 24.84	39.93– 39.98	US 127	Access via temporary ramp
Darke	Versailles	35.51	57.15	SR 185	
Darke	Versailles	35.94	57.84	SR 47 / SR 185	Northern terminus
1.000 mi = 1.609 km; 1.000 km = 0.621 mi: Concurrency terminus
