= Mann Mound =

Archaeological site in Ohio, United States

- U.S. National Register of Historic Places
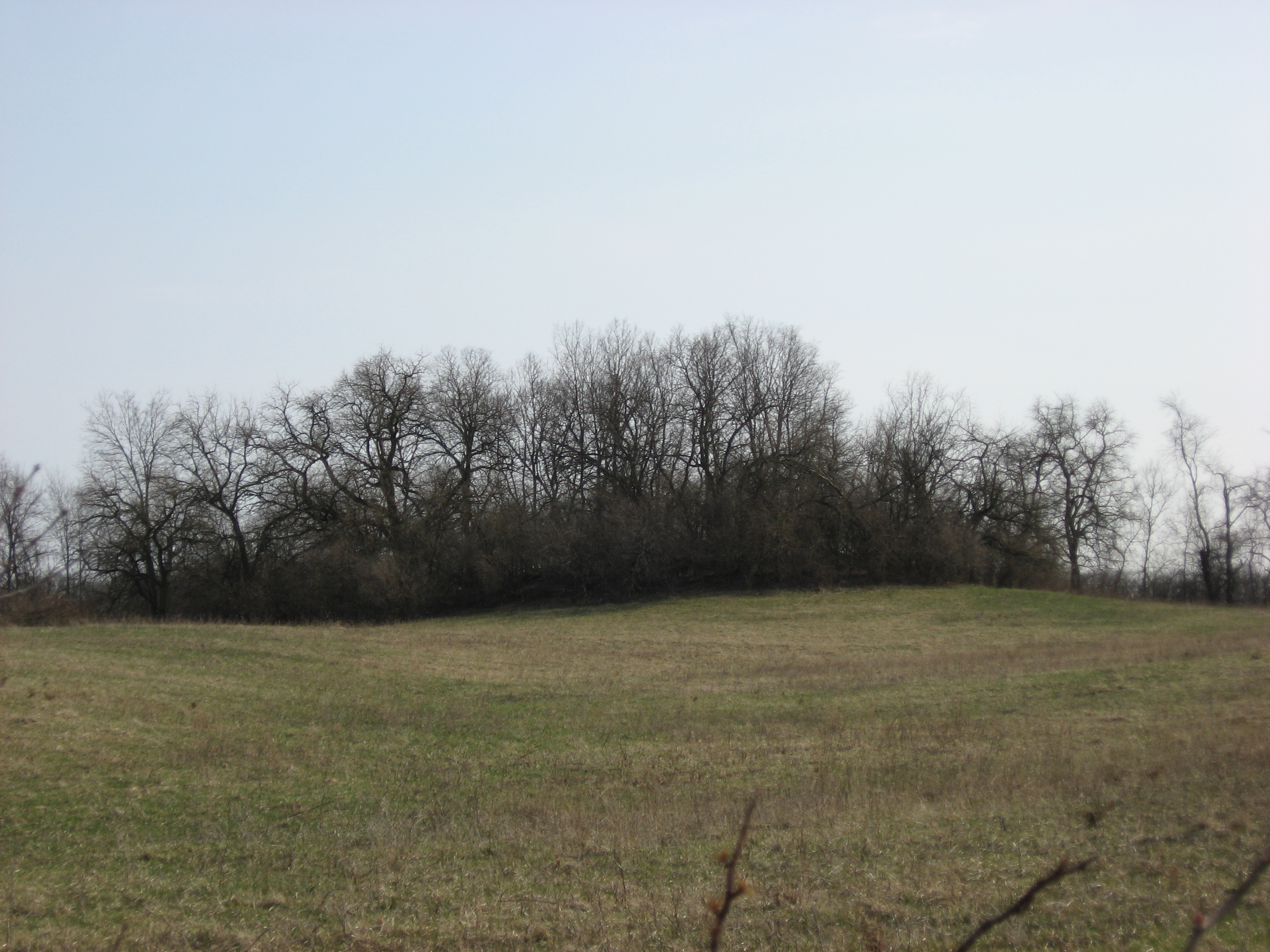
- Overview of the mound from the north

- Location within Ohio Location within the United States
- Location: Section 12 of Wayne Township, northeast of Jacksonburg
- Nearest city: Jacksonburg, Ohio
- Coordinates: 39°33′5.4″N 84°29′42″W
- Area: 1 acre (0.40 ha)
- NRHP reference No.: 71000632
- Added to NRHP: October 7, 1971

The Mann Mound is a Native American mound in the southwestern part of the U.S. state of Ohio. Located near the unincorporated community of Jacksonburg in Butler County, it is tree-covered and sits on the edge of a field in Section 12 of Wayne Township. Its height is approximately 20 feet (6.1 m), and its circumference is approximately 540 feet (160 m).

In November 1868, the mound was quarried for gravel by local residents; this excavation continued until the miners had reached the center of the mound, where they found multiple limestone burial vaults. These vaults were built as squares, 3 feet (0.91 m) on each side; each contained a skeleton that had presumably been placed in a seated position. The vaults were stacked from the mound's floor to a position just underneath its summit; each was separated from others by a small amount of gravel. Eight skeletons were removed from these vaults and sent to the Smithsonian Institution. Findings from the mound have led to the conclusion that it is a work of the Adena culture.

Despite the damage done by the amateur excavation, the Mann Mound is still a significant archaeological site and the second largest extant mound in Butler County. It was recorded by an archaeological survey published by J.P. MacLean in 1879, and in 1971, it was recognized for its archaeological significance when it was listed on the National Register of Historic Places.
