= Twin Township, Darke County, Ohio =

Township in Ohio, US

- Township
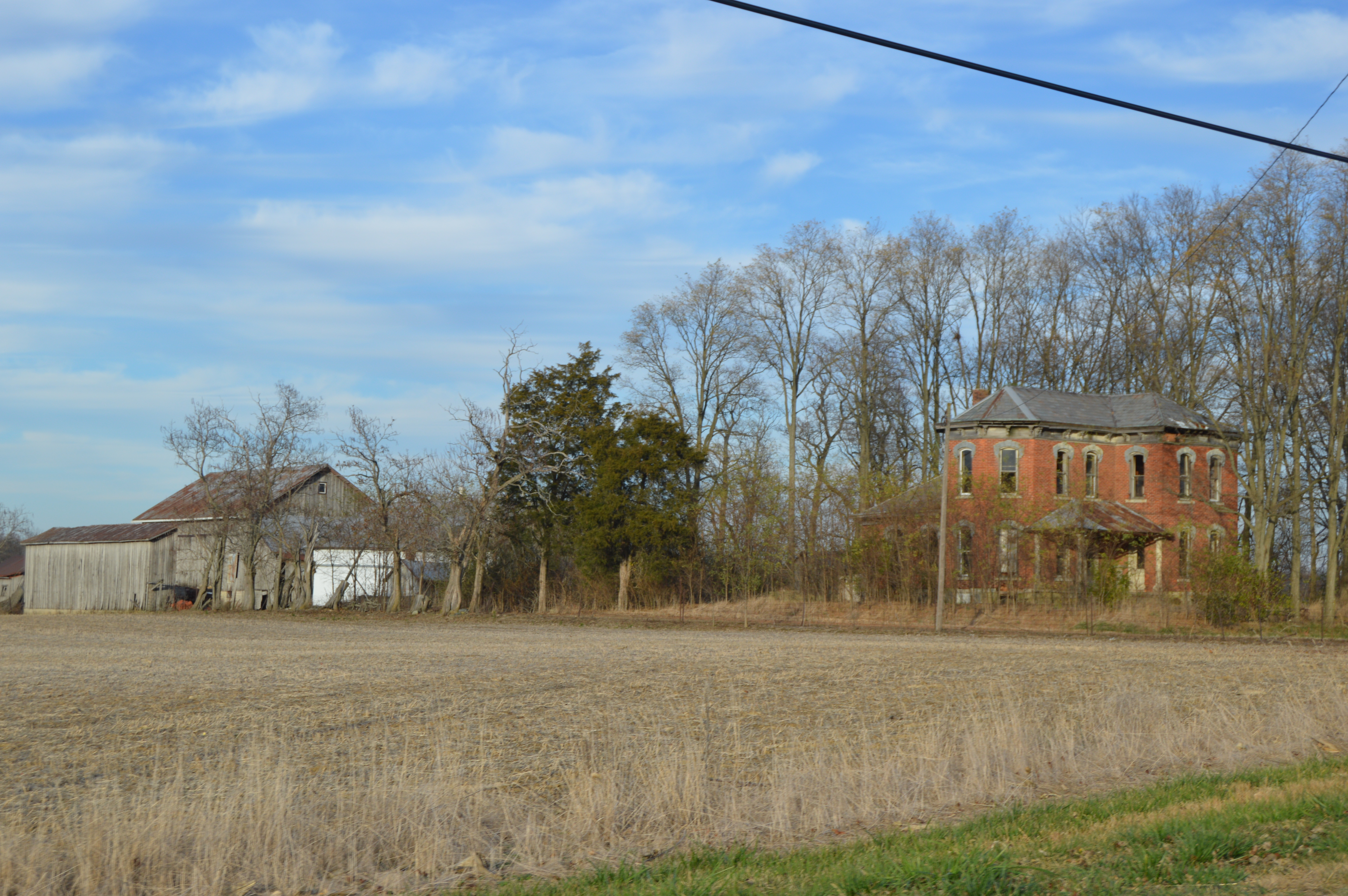
- Along State Route 722 between Castine and Ithaca

- Location in Darke County and the state of Ohio
- Coordinates: 39°58′30″N 84°33′13″W
- Country: United States
- State: Ohio
- County: Darke

Area
  - Total: 29.1 sq mi (75.3 km^{2})
  - Land: 29.0 sq mi (75.2 km^{2})
  - Water: 0.077 sq mi (0.2 km^{2})
- Elevation: 1,047 ft (319 m)

Population (2020)
  - Total: 4,249
  - Density: 146/sq mi (56.5/km^{2})
- Time zone: UTC-5 (Eastern (EST))
  - Summer (DST): UTC-4 (EDT)
- FIPS code: 39-77980
- GNIS feature ID: 1086023

Twin Township is one of the twenty townships of Darke County, Ohio, United States. The 2020 census found 4,249 people in the township.

== Geography ==
Located in the southern part of the county, it borders the following townships:

- Van Buren Township - north
- Franklin Township - northeast corner
- Monroe Township - east
- Harrison Township, Preble County - south
- Monroe Township, Preble County - southwest corner
- Butler Township - west
- Neave Township - northwest corner

Three incorporated villages are located in Twin Township:

- Arcanum, in the north
- Gordon, in the southeast
- Ithaca, in the south

== Name and history ==
Statewide, other Twin Townships are located in Preble and Ross counties.

Twin Township was established in 1817 from land given by Greenville Township. The township takes its name from Twin Creek.

== Government ==
The township is governed by a three-member board of trustees, who are elected in November of odd-numbered years to a four-year term beginning on the following January 1. Two are elected in the year after the presidential election and one is elected in the year before it. There is also an elected township fiscal officer, who serves a four-year term beginning on April 1 of the year after the election, which is held in November of the year before the presidential election. Vacancies in the fiscal officership or on the board of trustees are filled by the remaining trustees.
