= Ohio State Route 744 =

State highway in southwestern Ohio, US

State Route 744

Route information
- Maintained by ODOT
- Length: 10.82 mi (17.41 km)

Major junctions
- West end: US 127 near Somerville
- East end: SR 122 near Jacksonburg

Location
- Country: United States
- State: Ohio
- Counties: Preble, Butler

Highway system
- Ohio State Highway System; Interstate; US; State; Scenic
← SR 743	→ SR 745

State Route 744 (SR 744) is an east–west state highway in southwestern Ohio, a U.S. state. The western terminus of SR 744 is at its junction with US 127 a distance of 1 mile (1.6 km) northwest of Somerville. The eastern terminus of the state route is at a T-intersection with SR 122 approximately 1.50 miles (2.41 km) east of the village of Jacksonburg.

== Route description ==
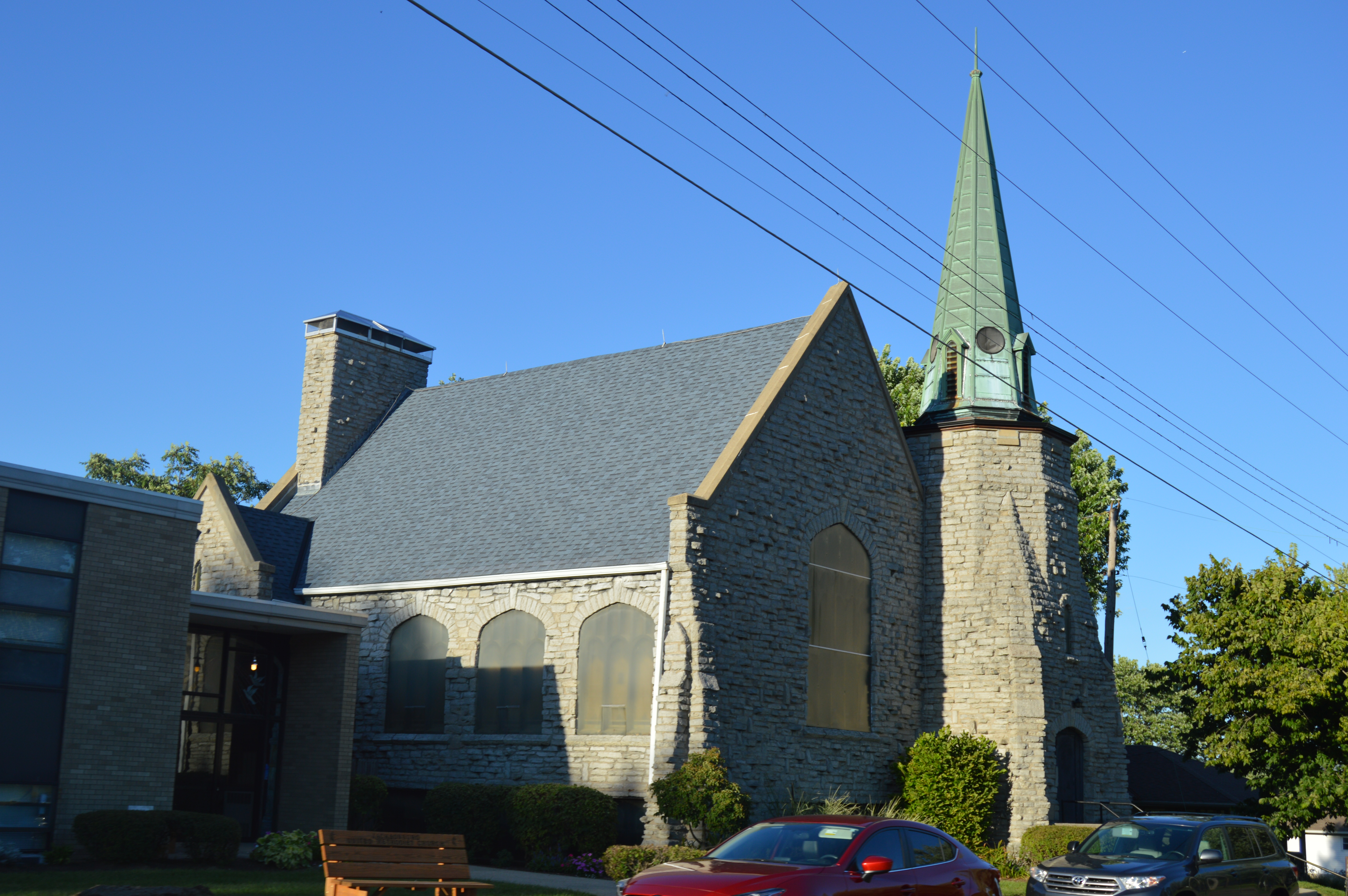
Methodist church in Jacksonburg

SR 744 travels through southern Preble County and northern Butler County. No stretch of the highway is a part of the National Highway System.

== History ==
When it was designated in 1937, SR 744 ran from its intersection where it splits off of Main Street in Somerville to its current eastern terminus at SR 122 east of Jacksonburg. At the time, Main Street through Somerville was the routing of US 127. By 1961, U.S. Route 127 was routed onto a new alignment west of Somerville, resulting in an extension of SR 744. From its previous western terminus, State Route 744 was routed north along the former alignment of US 127 to the County Road 30 intersection north of Somerville, and then west to the now-current US 127 routing, which marks the current western endpoint of the state highway.

== Major intersections ==
County	Location	mi	km	Destinations	Notes
Preble	Somers Township	0.00	0.00	US 127	
Butler	Wayne Township	6.34	10.20	SR 503 (West Elkton Road) – Seven Mile, West Elkton	
Butler	Madison Township	10.82	17.41	SR 122 (Middletown Eaton Road) – Middletown, Eaton	
1.000 mi = 1.609 km; 1.000 km = 0.621 mi
