= Ohio State Route 320 =

State highway in Preble County, Ohio, US

State Route 320

Route information
- Maintained by ODOT
- Length: 3.12 mi (5.02 km)
- Existed: March 9, 1932–present

Major junctions
- South end: US 35 near New Paris
- US 40 near New Paris
- North end: SR 121 in New Paris

Location
- Country: United States
- State: Ohio
- Counties: Preble

Highway system
- Ohio State Highway System; Interstate; US; State; Scenic
← SR 319	→ SR 321

State Route 320 (SR 320) is a short north–south state highway in western Ohio, a U.S. state. The southern terminus of SR 320 is at U.S. Route 35 (US 35) approximately three miles (4.8 km) southeast of New Paris, 3/4 mile (1.2 km) south of US 35's eastern junction with Interstate 70 (I-70). The northern terminus of the state highway is located in New Paris at a signalized intersection with SR 121.

This L-shaped two-lane highway was first designated in the early 1930s along the stretch between Preble County Road 335 (CR 335) and SR 121. The highway was extended some three decades later along the former US 35 to its current southern terminus when the U.S. highway was re-routed onto the newly constructed I-70 freeway nearby. The north–south portion of SR 320 between New Westville and New Paris runs in parallel to the east of the Indiana state line by a distance of just more than one mile (1.6 km). No direct access is provided between SR 320 and I-70/US 35. Consequently, one may access I-70 westbound from SR 320 via US 35. To get to I-70 eastbound from SR 320, one must follow CR 335 westbound into Indiana, where it becomes known as Eaton Pike, and connect to US 40 to access the freeway in the eastbound direction.

== Route description ==
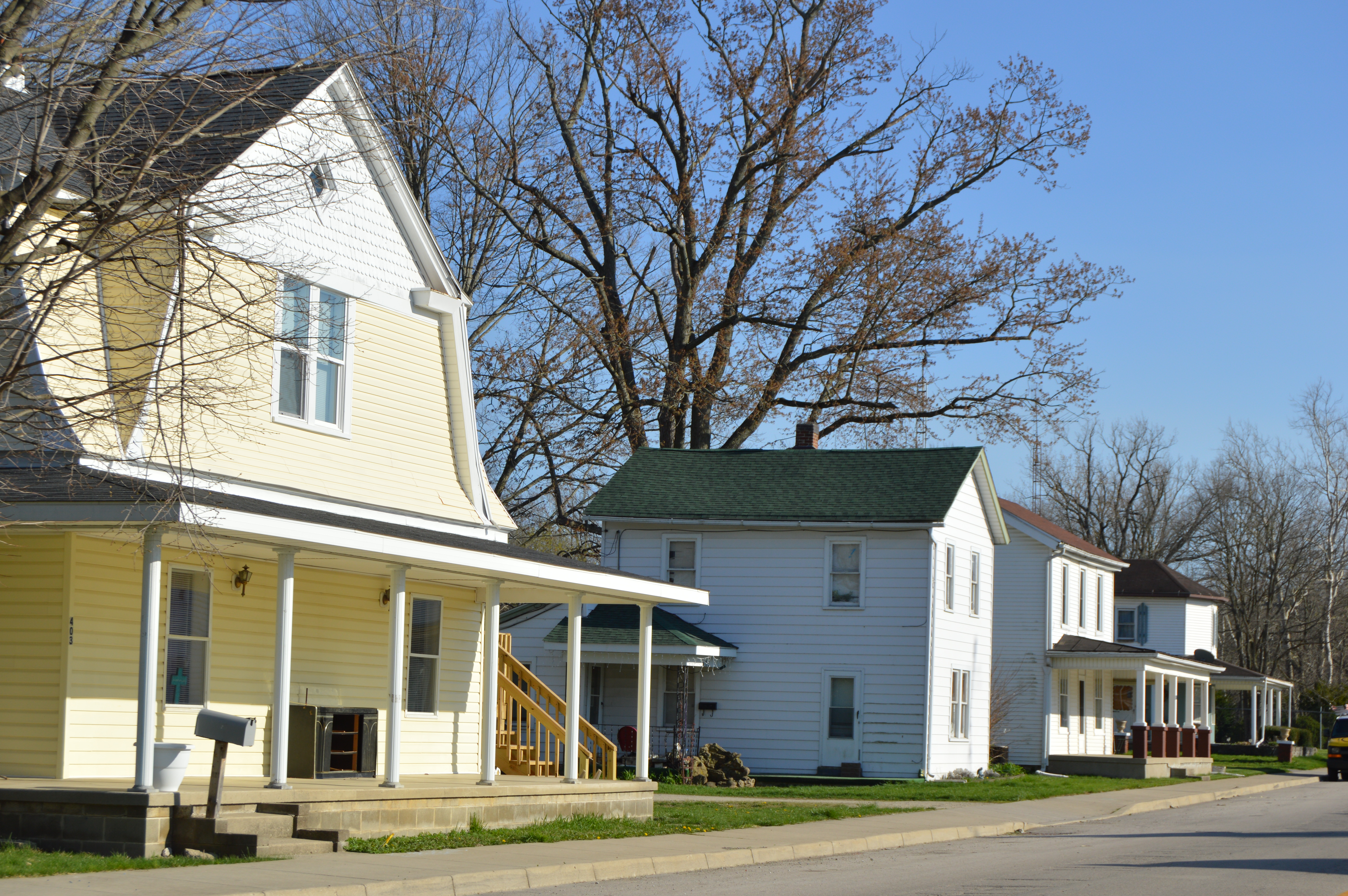
New Paris, near the northern terminus

SR 320 is located entirely within the northwestern corner of Preble County. The route begins at its intersection with US 35 south of where the U.S. route converges with I-70 at the Interstate's westernmost interchange in Ohio in Jackson Township. SR 320 travels to the west-northwest through rural farmland prior to bending to the west into the hamlet of New Westville, where the highway encounters a primarily residential area. At a four-way stop intersection there, SR 320 turns to the north, taking over for New Westville Road while CR 335 is the roadway that departs the intersection to the west. SR 320 now turns to the north-northwest, passing amidst a number of houses prior to crossing over the I-70/US 35 concurrency. To the north of the grade separation, SR 320 travels due north, and is bounded by homes and a large commercial facility on the west side, and farmland on the east side, with some batches of trees appearing along the way. It intersects US 40, then proceeds into Jefferson Township. A combination of woods and homes appear along the west side of the highway at this point, with more farmland abutting it to the east. After a short reverse curve that takes the highway to the northeast and then back to the north, SR 320 encounters forested land on both sides. Upon emerging from the wooded terrain, the highway enters New Paris. As it follows Washington Street northerly through the village, SR 320 passes amidst a blend of commercial businesses and residences leading up to its endpoint in downtown New Paris at a signalized intersection where it meets SR 121. This state highway is not included within the National Highway System.

== History ==
SR 320 first appeared in 1932, occupying the current stretch between its intersection with CR 335 (the former routing of US 35, which was originally designated as SR 11) and its current northern terminus at SR 121 in New Paris.

When the current I-70 freeway was constructed going eastward from Indiana into Ohio in 1962, US 35 was re-routed onto the freeway. As a result, SR 320 was extended southeasterly by approximately 0.75 miles (1.21 km) along the former US 35 to the current junction of the two routes.

== Major intersections ==
The entire route is in Preble County.

Location	mi	km	Destinations	Notes
Jackson Township	0.00	0.00	US 35 – Eaton	
Jackson Township	1.66	2.67	US 40 (National Road) – Lewisburg, Richmond	
New Paris	3.12	5.02	SR 121 (Washington Road / Cherry Street)	
1.000 mi = 1.609 km; 1.000 km = 0.621 mi
