= Gordon, Ohio =

- Village
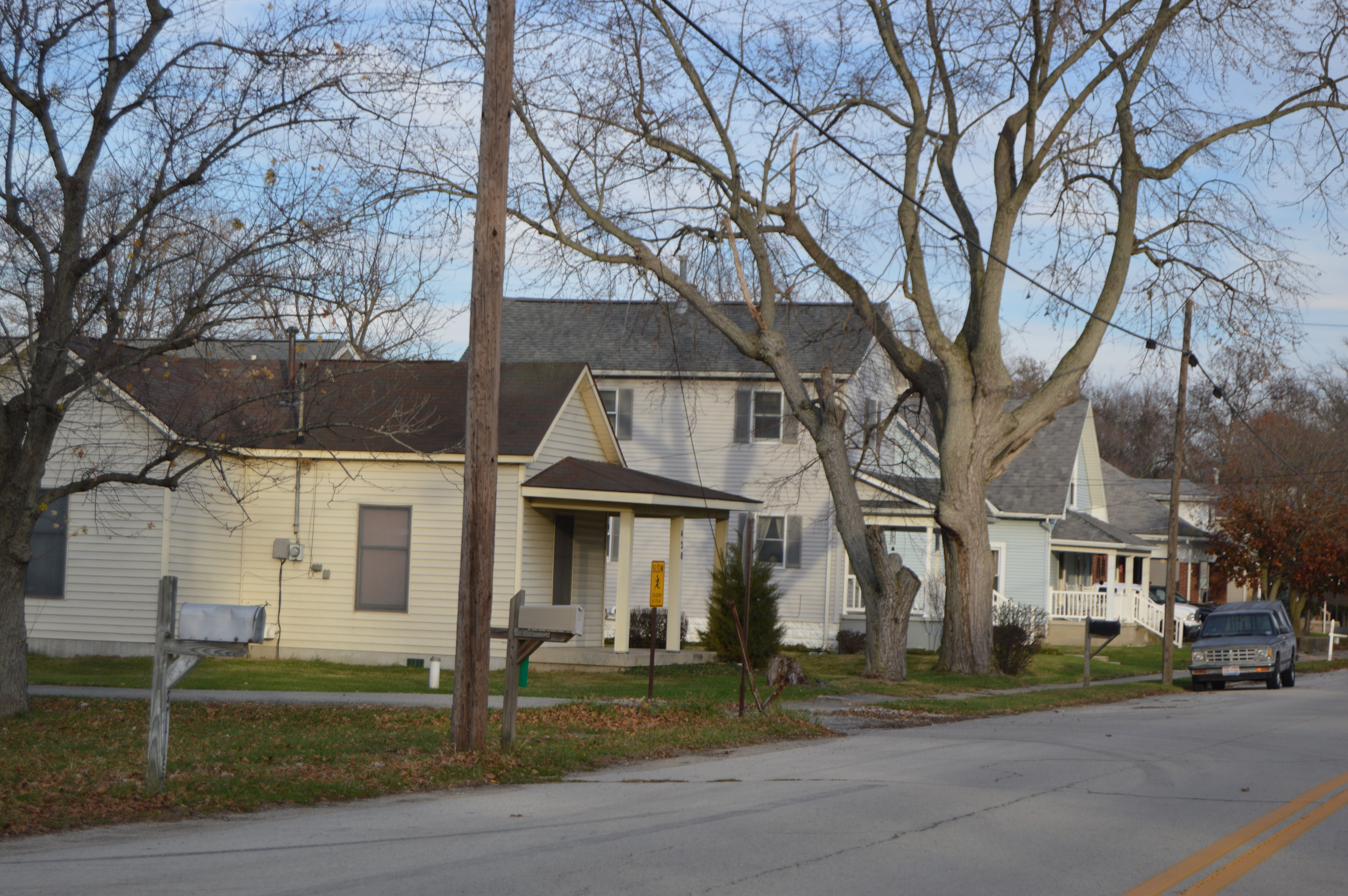
- North Street west of Main Street

- Location in Darke County and the state of Ohio.
- Coordinates: 39°55′49″N 84°30′33″W
- Country: United States
- State: Ohio
- County: Darke
- Township: Twin

Area
  - Total: 0.17 sq mi (0.43 km^{2})
  - Land: 0.17 sq mi (0.43 km^{2})
  - Water: 0 sq mi (0.00 km^{2})
- Elevation: 1,047 ft (319 m)

Population (2020)
  - Total: 245
  - Estimate (2023): 238
  - Density: 1,488.8/sq mi (574.81/km^{2})
- Time zone: UTC-5 (Eastern (EST))
  - Summer (DST): UTC-4 (EDT)
- ZIP code: 45304
- Area codes: 937, 326
- FIPS code: 39-30912
- GNIS feature ID: 2398179

Gordon is a village in Darke County, Ohio, United States. The population was 245 at the 2020 census.

== History ==
Gordon was platted in 1849 and named for one of its first settlers. It was located at the intersection of the Dayton and Union and Ohio Electric railroads.

== Geography ==
According to the United States Census Bureau, the village has a total area of 0.17 square miles (0.44 km^{2}), all land.

== Demographics ==
Historical population
Census	Pop.	Note	%±
1870	87		—
1900	177		—
1910	181		2.3%
1920	153		−15.5%
1930	137		−10.5%
1940	178		29.9%
1950	197		10.7%
1960	265		34.5%
1970	232		−12.5%
1980	230		−0.9%
1990	206		−10.4%
2000	190		−7.8%
2010	212		11.6%
2020	245		15.6%
2023 (est.)	238	▼	−2.9%
U.S. Decennial Census

=== 2010 census ===
As of the census of 2010, there were 212 people, 74 households, and 59 families living in the village. The population density was 1,247.1 inhabitants per square mile (481.5/km^{2}). There were 79 housing units at an average density of 464.7 per square mile (179.4/km^{2}). The racial makeup of the village was 97.6% White, 0.5% African American, 0.5% Native American, 0.5% from other races, and 0.9% from two or more races.

There were 74 households, of which 32.4% had children under the age of 18 living with them, 63.5% were married couples living together, 10.8% had a female householder with no husband present, 5.4% had a male householder with no wife present, and 20.3% were non-families. 18.9% of all households were made up of individuals, and 12.2% had someone living alone who was 65 years of age or older. The average household size was 2.86 and the average family size was 3.24.

The median age in the village was 40.8 years. 25% of residents were under the age of 18; 9.9% were between the ages of 18 and 24; 24% were from 25 to 44; 27.4% were from 45 to 64; and 13.7% were 65 years of age or older. The gender makeup of the village was 53.3% male and 46.7% female.

=== 2000 census ===
As of the census of 2000, there were 190 people, 74 households, and 58 families living in the village. The population density was 1,159.6 inhabitants per square mile (447.7/km^{2}). There were 78 housing units at an average density of 476.1 per square mile (183.8/km^{2}). The racial makeup of the village was 100.00% White.

There were 74 households, out of which 40.5% had children under the age of 18 living with them, 67.6% were married couples living together, 6.8% had a female householder with no husband present, and 21.6% were non-families. 17.6% of all households were made up of individuals, and 4.1% had someone living alone who was 65 years of age or older. The average household size was 2.57 and the average family size was 2.93.

In the village, the population was spread out, with 29.5% under the age of 18, 4.2% from 18 to 24, 38.4% from 25 to 44, 22.6% from 45 to 64, and 5.3% who were 65 years of age or older. The median age was 34 years. For every 100 females there were 102.1 males. For every 100 females age 18 and over, there were 103.0 males.

The median income for a household in the village was $35,750, and the median income for a family was $38,125. Males had a median income of $35,833 versus $21,607 for females. The per capita income for the village was $16,949. None of the families and 0.5% of the population were living below the poverty line.
