= Wayne Township, Butler County, Ohio =

Township in Ohio, US

- Township
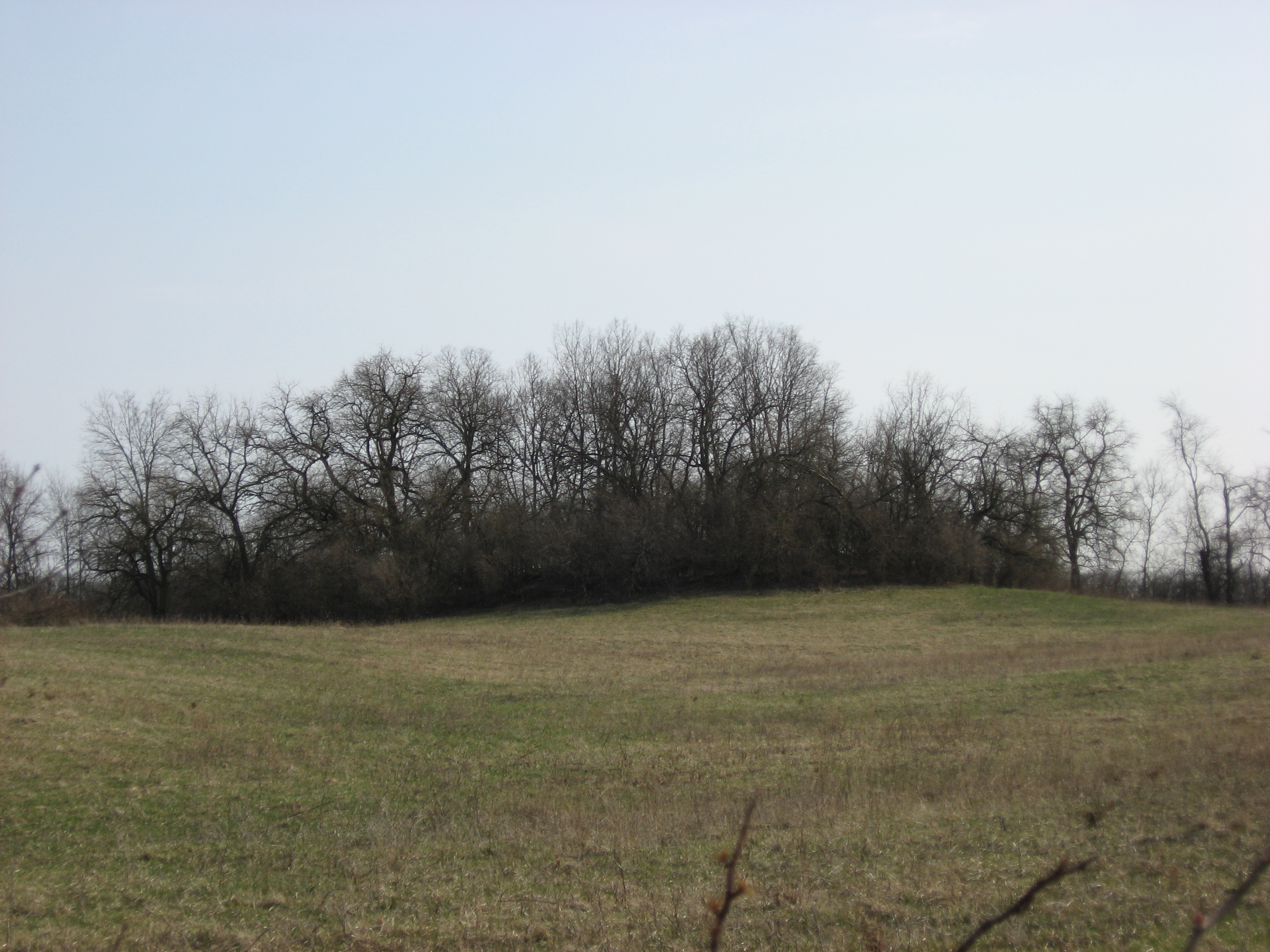
- Prehistoric Mann Mound

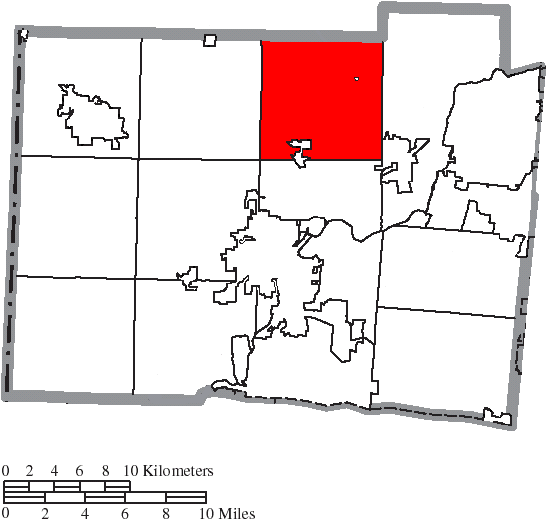
- Location of Wayne Township in Butler County
- Coordinates: 39°30′26″N 84°32′36″W
- Country: United States
- State: Ohio
- County: Butler

Area
  - Total: 36.6 sq mi (94.9 km^{2})
  - Land: 36.6 sq mi (94.8 km^{2})
  - Water: 0.039 sq mi (0.1 km^{2})
- Elevation: 850 ft (259 m)

Population (2020)
  - Total: 4,375
  - Density: 121/sq mi (46.9/km^{2})
- Time zone: UTC-5 (Eastern (EST))
  - Summer (DST): UTC-4 (EDT)
- FIPS code: 39-82082
- GNIS feature ID: 1085823
- Website: waynetownship.net

Wayne Township is one of thirteen townships in Butler County, Ohio, United States. The township is located in the north-central part of the county, between Trenton and Oxford. It had a total population of 4,375 at the 2020 census.

== History ==
Wayne was the sixth township of the county, erected from St. Clair Township by the Butler County Commissioners on December 2, 1805.

=== Name ===
Named for General Anthony Wayne, it is one of twenty Wayne Townships in Ohio.

== Geography ==
Located in the northern part of the county, it borders the following townships:

- Gratis Township, Preble County - north
- Madison Township - east
- St. Clair Township - south
- Hanover Township - southwest corner
- Milford Township - west
- Somers Township, Preble County - northwest corner

Two villages are located in Wayne Township: Jacksonburg in the northeast, and part of Seven Mile, in the south.

== Government ==
The township is governed by a three-member board of trustees, who are elected in November of odd-numbered years to a four-year term beginning on the following January 1. Two are elected in the year after the presidential election and one is elected in the year before it. There is also an elected township fiscal officer, who serves a four-year term beginning on April 1 of the year after the election, which is held in November of the year before the presidential election. Vacancies in the fiscal officership or on the board of trustees are filled by the remaining trustees.

== Public services ==
The township is in the Edgewood Local School District.

The township is in the Trenton and Seven Mile telephone exchanges.

Major roads are U.S. Route 127 (the principal road between Hamilton and Eaton), and State Routes 73 (the principal road between Oxford and Middletown), 122, 503, and 744.
