= Peter Schrock Jr. Farm =

Historic house in Ohio, US

- U.S. National Register of Historic Places
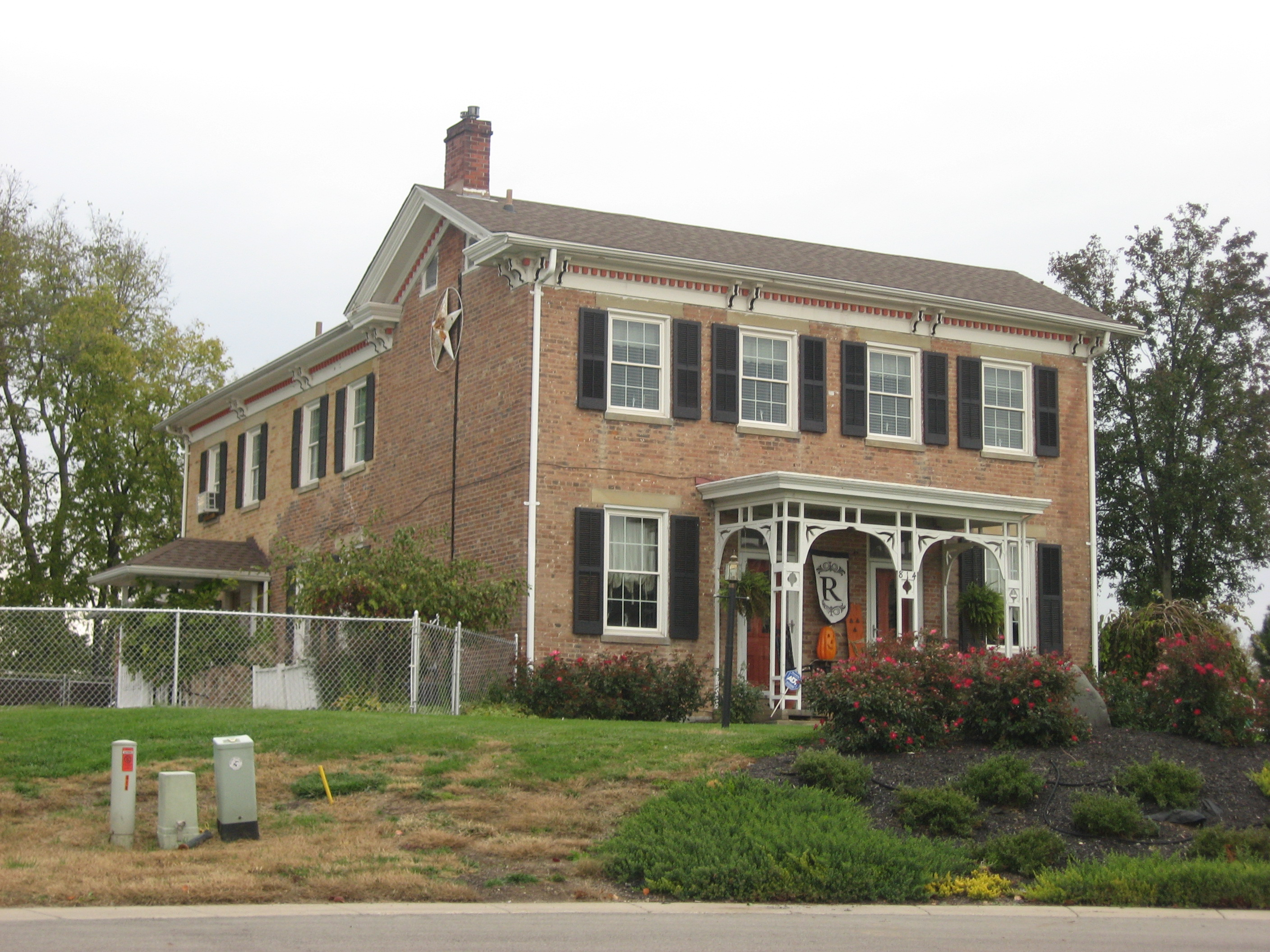
- Front and western side

- Location within Ohio Location within the United States
- Nearest city: Trenton, Ohio
- Coordinates: 39°28′38″N 84°28′16″W
- MPS: Augspurger Amish/Mennonite Settlement TR
- NRHP reference No.: 84000210
- Added to NRHP: 1984-11-01

Peter Schrock Jr. Farm is a historic building near Trenton, Ohio, listed on the National Register of Historic Places in 1984.

== Historic uses ==
- Single Dwelling
- Secondary Structure
