= New Paris, Ohio =

- Village
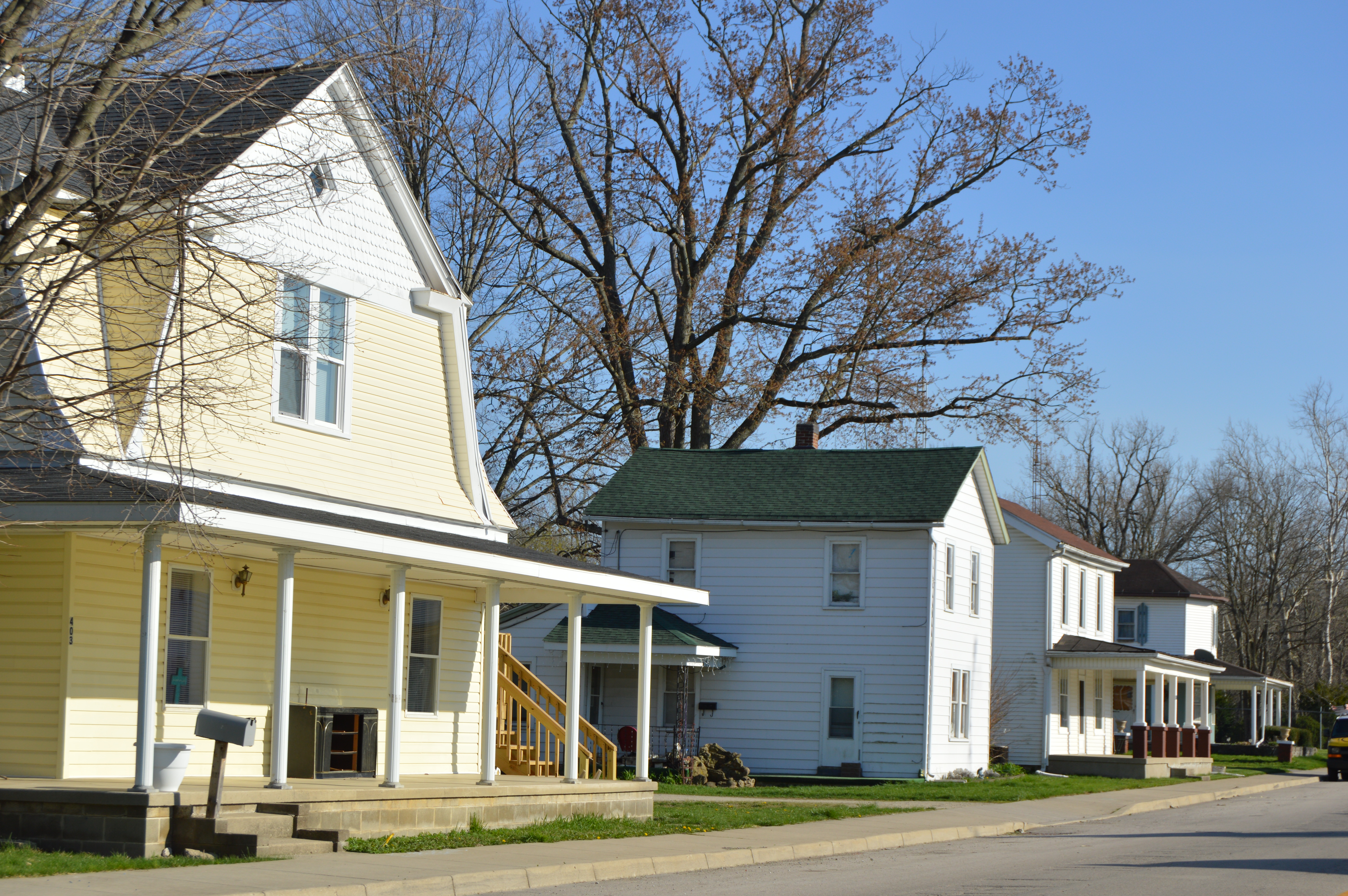
- South Washington Street

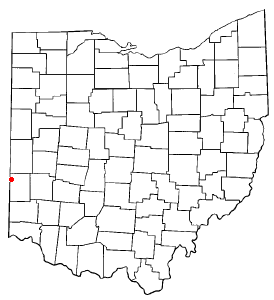
- Location of New Paris, Ohio

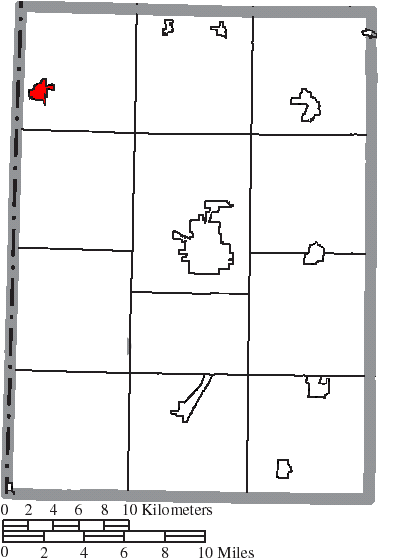
- Location of New Paris in Preble County
- Coordinates: 39°51′23″N 84°47′32″W
- Country: United States
- State: Ohio
- County: Preble

Area
  - Total: 0.76 sq mi (1.96 km^{2})
  - Land: 0.73 sq mi (1.90 km^{2})
  - Water: 0.023 sq mi (0.06 km^{2})
- Elevation: 1,040 ft (320 m)

Population (2020)
  - Total: 1,494
  - Density: 2,031.8/sq mi (784.48/km^{2})
- Time zone: UTC-5 (Eastern (EST))
  - Summer (DST): UTC-4 (EDT)
- ZIP code: 45347
- Area codes: 937, 326
- FIPS code: 39-55188
- GNIS feature ID: 2399479
- Website: https://villageofnewparisohio.com/

New Paris is a village in Preble County, Ohio, United States. The population was 1,494 at the 2020 census. It is part of the Dayton Metropolitan Statistical Area.

== History ==
New Paris was platted in 1817, and named after Paris, Kentucky, the former home of a share of the first settlers. A post office called New Paris has been in operation since 1820.

== Geography ==
According to the United States Census Bureau, the village has a total area of 0.76 square miles (1.97 km^{2}), of which, 0.74 square miles (1.92 km^{2}) is land and 0.02 square miles (0.05 km^{2}) is water.

The village is at the intersection of State Routes 121 and 320, north of Interstate 70.

New Paris is just east of the Indiana state line.

The village is heavily dominated by cornfields, a staple of this area of Ohio.

== Demographics ==
Historical population
Census	Pop.	Note	%±
1830	154		—
1880	835		—
1890	842		0.8%
1900	790		−6.2%
1910	870		10.1%
1920	907		4.3%
1930	925		2.0%
1940	989		6.9%
1950	1,046		5.8%
1960	1,679		60.5%
1970	1,692		0.8%
1980	1,709		1.0%
1990	1,801		5.4%
2000	1,623		−9.9%
2010	1,629		0.4%
2020	1,494		−8.3%
U.S. Decennial Census

=== 2010 census ===
As of the census of 2010, there were 1,629 people, 715 households, and 431 families living in the village. The population density was 2,201.4 inhabitants per square mile (850.0/km^{2}). There were 788 housing units at an average density of 1,064.9 per square mile (411.2/km^{2}). The racial makeup of the village was 97.7% White, 0.1% African American, 0.6% Native American, 0.1% Asian, 0.1% Pacific Islander, 0.1% from other races, and 1.3% from two or more races. Hispanic or Latino of any race were 0.4% of the population.

There were 715 households, of which 31.9% had children under the age of 18 living with them, 37.8% were married couples living together, 16.2% had a female householder with no husband present, 6.3% had a male householder with no wife present, and 39.7% were non-families. 34.3% of all households were made up of individuals, and 14.4% had someone living alone who was 65 years of age or older. The average household size was 2.28 and the average family size was 2.87.

The median age in the village was 36.7 years. 25.6% of residents were under the age of 18; 8.4% were between the ages of 18 and 24; 25.6% were from 25 to 44; 25.8% were from 45 to 64; and 14.7% were 65 years of age or older. The gender makeup of the village was 46.8% male and 53.2% female.

=== 2000 census ===
As of the census of 2000, there were 1,623 people, 692 households, and 446 families living in the village. The population density was 2,272.1 inhabitants per square mile (877.3/km^{2}). There were 744 housing units at an average density of 1,041.6 per square mile (402.2/km^{2}). The racial makeup of the village was 99.01% White, 0.31% African American, 0.12% Asian, and 0.55% from two or more races. Hispanic or Latino of any race were 0.12% of the population.

There were 692 households, out of which 30.9% had children under the age of 18 living with them, 48.3% were married couples living together, 11.6% had a female householder with no husband present, and 35.5% were non-families. 30.9% of all households were made up of individuals, and 11.1% had someone living alone who was 65 years of age or older. The average household size was 2.35 and the average family size was 2.91.

In the village, the population was spread out, with 24.2% under the age of 18, 10.4% from 18 to 24, 29.3% from 25 to 44, 20.8% from 45 to 64, and 15.3% who were 65 years of age or older. The median age was 37 years. For every 100 females there were 93.9 males. For every 100 females age 18 and over, there were 91.6 males.

The median income for a household in the village was $31,726, and the median income for a family was $36,402. Males had a median income of $27,870 versus $21,731 for females. The per capita income for the village was $14,422. About 8.2% of families and 10.1% of the population were below the poverty line, including 18.8% of those under age 18 and 4.0% of those age 65 or over.

== Education ==
New Paris is part of the National Trail Local School District. The National Trail School District campus is located 4.5 mi from New Paris. .

New Paris has a public library, a branch of the Preble County District Library.

== Notable people ==
- Benjamin Hanby, wrote the Christmas carol "Up On The House Top" in New Paris in 1864
- Grayson L. Kirk, president of Columbia University and instrumental in the formation of the United Nations; was briefly principal of New Paris High School
- David Purviance, minister and legislator
- Elizabeth Watkins, philanthropist
