= Otterbein, Ohio =

- Unincorporated community
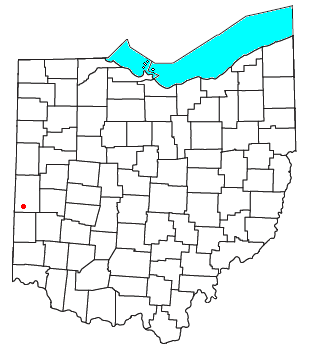
- Location of Otterbein, Ohio
- Coordinates: 39°56′45″N 84°40′18″W
- Country: United States
- State: Ohio
- County: Darke
- Township: Butler
- Elevation: 1,112 ft (339 m)
- Time zone: UTC-5 (Eastern (EST))
  - Summer (DST): UTC-4 (EDT)
- GNIS feature ID: 1062926

Otterbein (also Otterbine) is an unincorporated community in southwestern Butler Township, Darke County, Ohio, United States. It lies at the intersection of Otterbin Ithaca and Preble County Butler Township Roads southwest of the city of Greenville, the county seat. Because the community has borne multiple names, the Board on Geographic Names officially designated it "Otterbein" in 1963.
