= Neave Township, Darke County, Ohio =

Township in Ohio, US

- Township
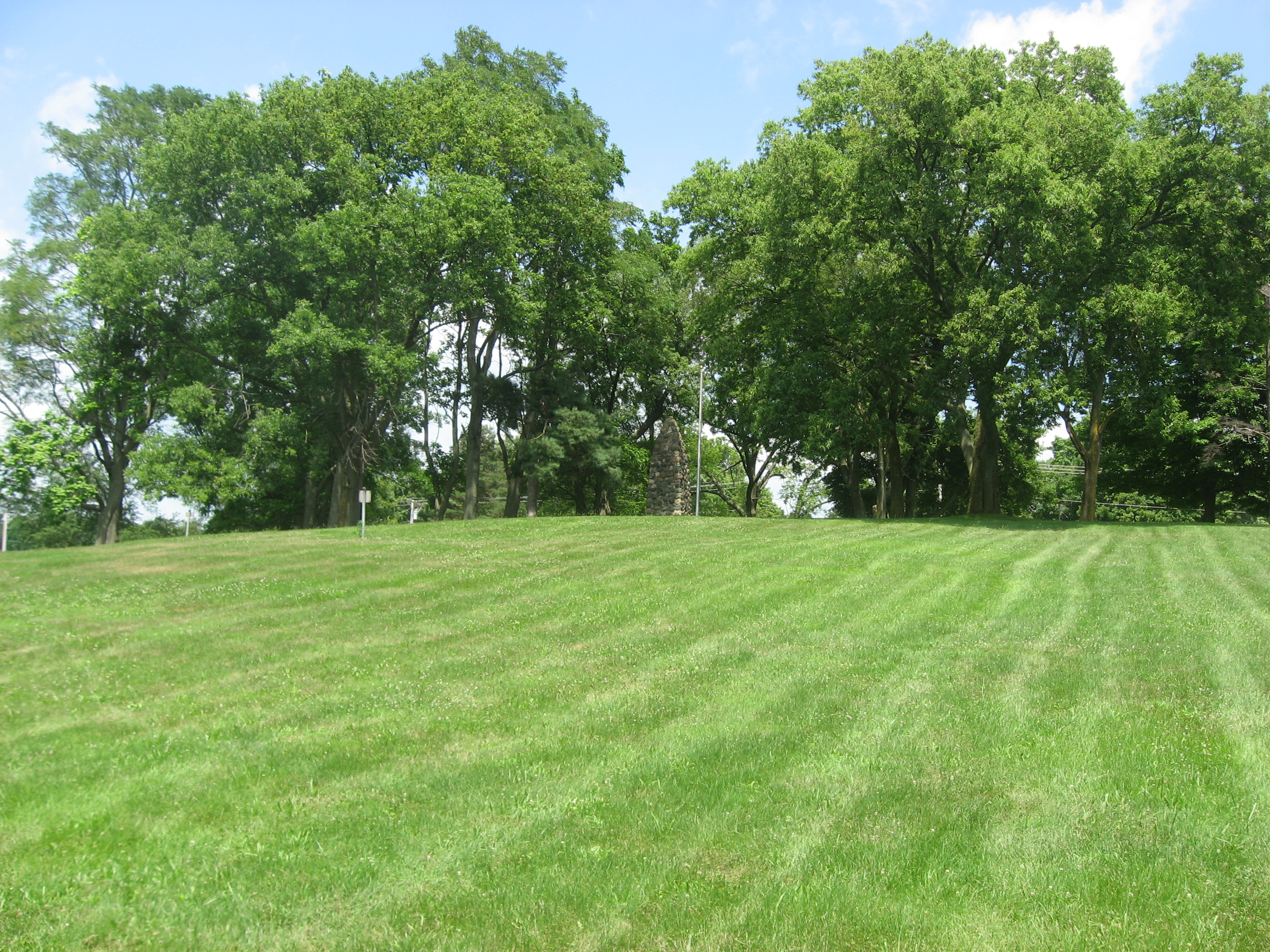
- The site of Fort Jefferson, a historic site in the township

- Location in Darke County and the state of Ohio.
- Coordinates: 40°1′45″N 84°39′41″W
- Country: United States
- State: Ohio
- County: Darke

Area
  - Total: 23.1 sq mi (59.7 km^{2})
  - Land: 22.9 sq mi (59.3 km^{2})
  - Water: 0.31 sq mi (0.8 km^{2})
- Elevation: 1,080 ft (330 m)

Population (2020)
  - Total: 2,198
  - Density: 96.0/sq mi (37.1/km^{2})
- Time zone: UTC-5 (Eastern (EST))
  - Summer (DST): UTC-4 (EDT)
- FIPS code: 39-53732
- GNIS feature ID: 1086020

Neave Township is one of the twenty townships of Darke County, Ohio, United States. The 2020 census found 2,198 people in the township.

== Geography ==
Located in the southern part of the county, it borders the following townships:

- Greenville Township - north
- Van Buren Township - east
- Twin Township - southeast corner
- Butler Township - south
- Harrison Township - southwest corner
- Liberty Township - west

The village of Wayne Lakes is located in southern Neave Township.

== Name and history ==
It is the only Neave Township statewide.

Neave Township was established in 1821.

== Government ==
The township is governed by a three-member board of trustees, who are elected in November of odd-numbered years to a four-year term beginning on the following January 1. Two are elected in the year after the presidential election and one is elected in the year before it. There is also an elected township fiscal officer, who serves a four-year term beginning on April 1 of the year after the election, which is held in November of the year before the presidential election. Vacancies in the fiscal officer or on the board of trustees are filled by the remaining trustees.
