= Harrison Township, Darke County, Ohio =

Township in Ohio, US

- Township
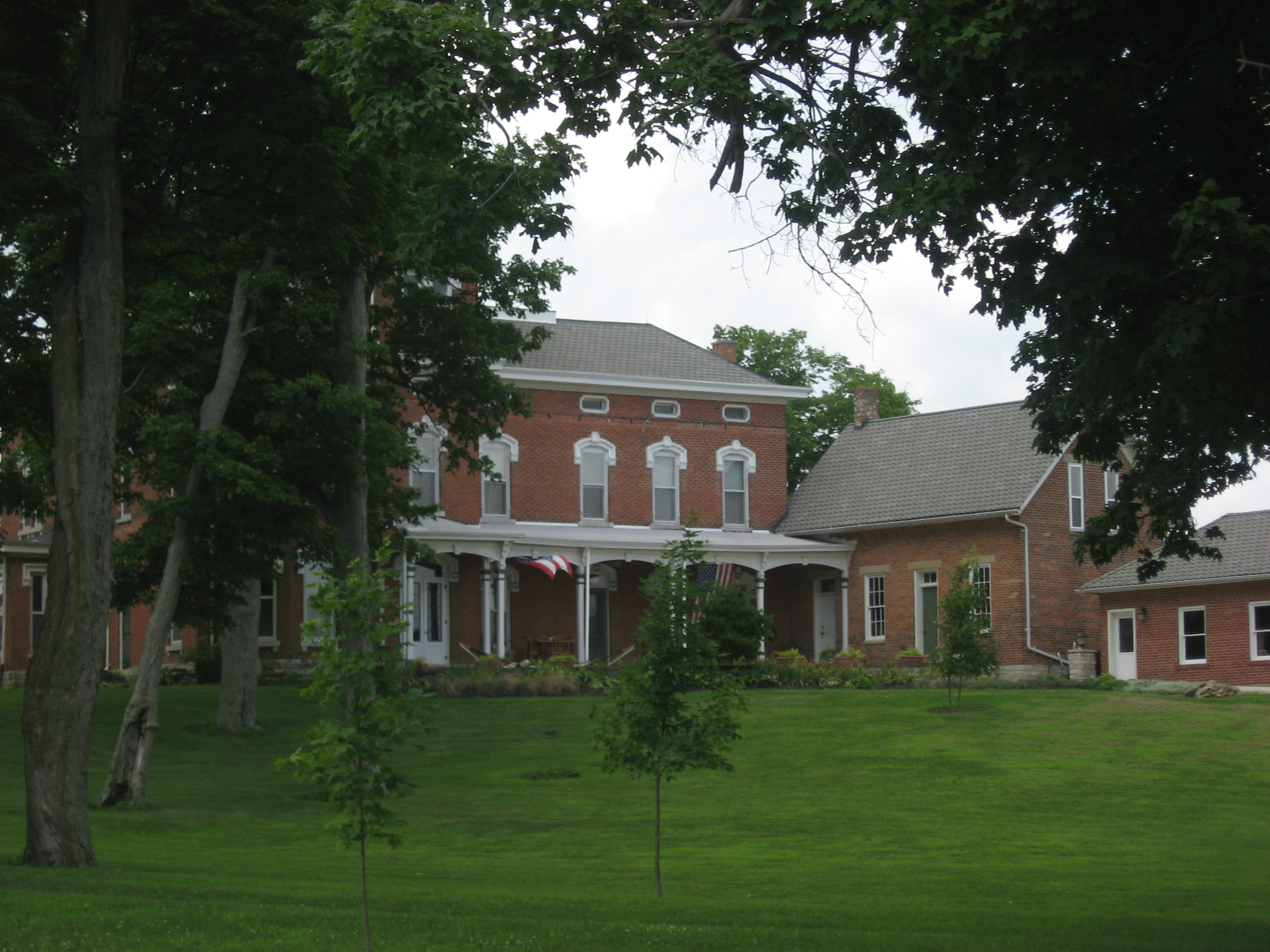
- The Christopher C. Walker Farmhouse, a historic site in the township

- Location in Darke County and the state of Ohio.
- Coordinates: 39°57′52″N 84°45′53″W
- Country: United States
- State: Ohio
- County: Darke

Area
  - Total: 34.2 sq mi (88.5 km^{2})
  - Land: 34.1 sq mi (88.3 km^{2})
  - Water: 0.077 sq mi (0.2 km^{2})
- Elevation: 1,178 ft (359 m)

Population (2020)
  - Total: 2,164
  - Density: 63.5/sq mi (24.5/km^{2})
- Time zone: UTC-5 (Eastern (EST))
  - Summer (DST): UTC-4 (EDT)
- FIPS code: 39-33810
- GNIS feature ID: 1086015
- Website: https://www.harrisontwpdarke.com/

Harrison Township is one of the twenty townships of Darke County, Ohio, United States. The 2020 census found 2,164 people in the township.

== Geography ==
Located in the southwestern corner of the county, it borders the following townships:

- Liberty Township - north
- Neave Township - northeast corner
- Butler Township - east
- Monroe Township, Preble County - southeast corner
- Jefferson Township, Preble County - south
- Franklin Township, Wayne County, Indiana - west

Two incorporated villages are located in Harrison Township: Hollansburg in the northwest, and part of New Madison in the east.

== Name and history ==
It is one of nineteen Harrison Townships statewide.

The area within the modern borders of Harrison Township was first settled in 1810, but it was abandoned after Native American attacks; no settlers returned until after the end of the War of 1812. American soldiers built two forts in 1813 for that war within the bounds of the present township: Fort Black, near Main Street in present-day New Madison, and Fort Nesbitt, in Section 32. After the war's end, some settlers returned to the area, along with many former residents of Kentucky. Growth in population enabled Harrison Township to be formed by splitting Twin Township in May 1818; its initial area was reduced by the formation of German Township in 1820. The first school was established in the township in 1819, while the township's first church was a Church of Christ.

== Government ==
The township is governed by a three-member board of trustees, who are elected in November of odd-numbered years to a four-year term beginning on the following January 1. Two are elected in the year after the presidential election and one is elected in the year before it. There is also an elected township fiscal officer, who serves a four-year term beginning on April 1 of the year after the election, which is held in November of the year before the presidential election. Vacancies in the fiscal officership or on the board of trustees are filled by the remaining trustees.
