= Trenton, Ohio =

City in Ohio, US

- City
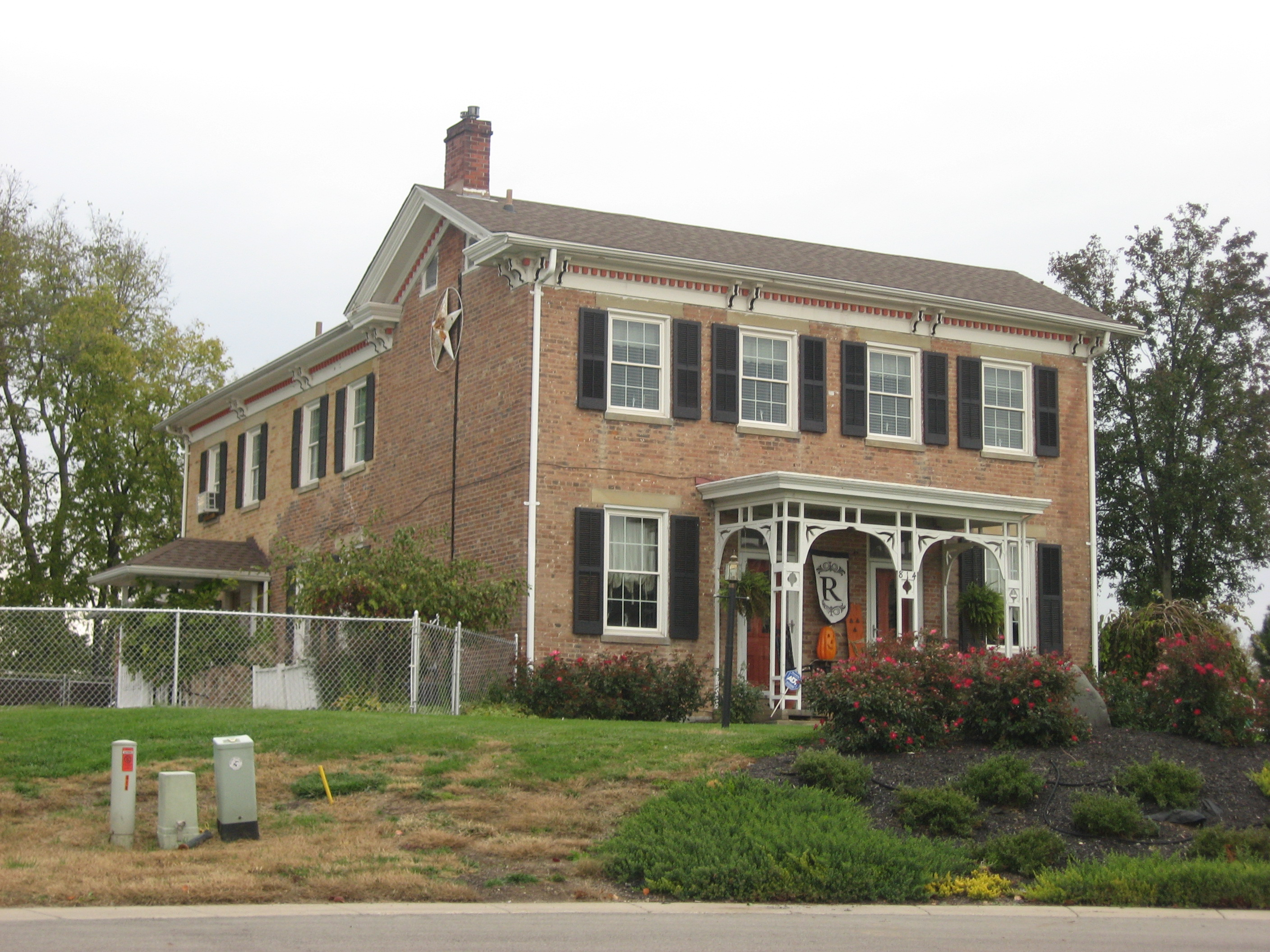
- Peter Schrock Farmhouse on Carriage Lane

- Logo

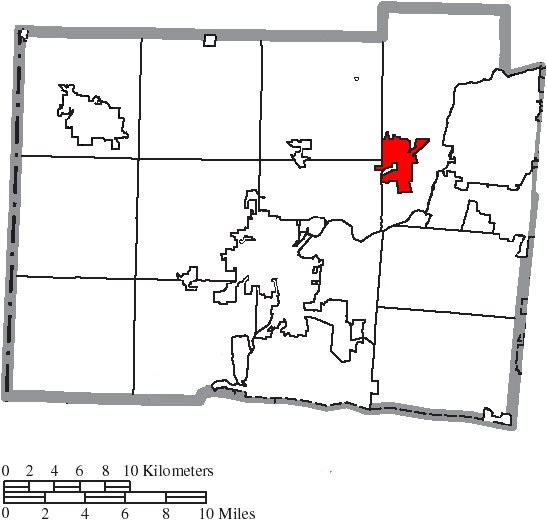
- Location of Trenton in Butler County

- Location within Ohio Location within the United States
- Coordinates: 39°28′55″N 84°27′44″W
- Country: United States
- State: Ohio
- County: Butler

Government
  - Mayor: Calvin G. Woodrey

Area
  - Total: 4.85 sq mi (12.55 km^{2})
  - Land: 4.84 sq mi (12.54 km^{2})
  - Water: 0.0039 sq mi (0.01 km^{2})
- Elevation: 650 ft (200 m)

Population (2020)
  - Total: 13,021
  - Density: 2,688.7/sq mi (1,038.12/km^{2})
- Time zone: UTC-5 (Eastern)
  - Summer (DST): UTC-4 (EDT)
- ZIP code: 45067
- Area code: 513
- FIPS code: 39-77322
- GNIS feature ID: 1085821
- Website: trentonoh.gov

Trenton is a city in northeastern Butler County, Ohio, United States, west of Middletown. The population was 13,021 at the 2020 census. It is part of the Cincinnati metropolitan area.

== History ==
Trenton was originally called Bloomfield, and under the latter name was platted in 1815. Bloomfield was named for Joseph Bloomfield, governor of New Jersey. In 1831, it was discovered that there was already a Bloomfield post office in Ohio, and so the town was renamed after the state capital of New Jersey at Trenton. Originally in Madison Township, it later annexed land in Wayne Township.

Trenton was once a stop on the Cincinnati, Hamilton and Dayton Railway.

== Geography ==
Trenton is located on the west bank of the Great Miami River.

According to the United States Census Bureau, the city has a total area of 4.56 square miles (11.81 km^{2}), all land.

== Demographics ==
Historical population
Census	Pop.	Note	%±
1840	151		—
1850	220		45.7%
1860	301		36.8%
1870	341		13.3%
1880	377		10.6%
1900	387		—
1910	564		45.7%
1920	618		9.6%
1930	666		7.8%
1940	777		16.7%
1950	987		27.0%
1960	3,064		210.4%
1970	5,278		72.3%
1980	6,401		21.3%
1990	6,189		−3.3%
2000	8,746		41.3%
2010	11,869		35.7%
2020	13,021		9.7%
2025 (est.)	14,241		9.4%

=== 2020 census ===
As of the 2020 census, Trenton had a population of 13,021. The median age was 33.3 years. 29.4% of residents were under the age of 18 and 11.4% of residents were 65 years of age or older. For every 100 females there were 95.8 males, and for every 100 females age 18 and over there were 92.7 males age 18 and over.

99.9% of residents lived in urban areas, while 0.1% lived in rural areas.

There were 4,571 households in Trenton, of which 43.6% had children under the age of 18 living in them. Of all households, 51.1% were married-couple households, 14.7% were households with a male householder and no spouse or partner present, and 24.4% were households with a female householder and no spouse or partner present. About 19.2% of all households were made up of individuals and 8.0% had someone living alone who was 65 years of age or older.

There were 4,700 housing units, of which 2.7% were vacant. The homeowner vacancy rate was 0.7% and the rental vacancy rate was 3.6%.

Racial composition as of the 2020 census
Race	Number	Percent
White	11,615	89.2%
Black or African American	295	2.3%
American Indian and Alaska Native	39	0.3%
Asian	92	0.7%
Native Hawaiian and Other Pacific Islander	13	0.1%
Some other race	143	1.1%
Two or more races	824	6.3%
Hispanic or Latino (of any race)	358	2.7%

=== 2010 census ===
As of the census of 2010, there were 11,869 people, 4,160 households, and 3,258 families living in the city. The population density was 2,602.9 inhabitants per square mile (1,005.0/km^{2}). There were 4,454 housing units at an average density of 976.8 per square mile (377.1/km^{2}). The racial makeup of the city was 96.2% White, 1.0% African American, 0.2% Native American, 0.5% Asian, 0.3% from other races, and 1.9% from two or more races. Hispanic or Latino of any race were 1.7% of the population.

There were 4,160 households, of which 47.0% had children under the age of 18 living with them, 57.0% were married couples living together, 15.1% had a female householder with no husband present, 6.3% had a male householder with no wife present, and 21.7% were non-families. 17.1% of all households were made up of individuals, and 6.4% had someone living alone who was 65 years of age or older. The average household size was 2.85 and the average family size was 3.18.

The median age in the city was 32.2 years. 31% of residents were under the age of 18; 8.1% were between the ages of 18 and 24; 30.7% were from 25 to 44; 20.8% were from 45 to 64; and 9.4% were 65 years of age or older. The gender makeup of the city was 48.6% male and 51.4% female.

=== 2000 census ===
As of the census of 2000, there were 8,746 people, 3,189 households, and 2,519 families living in the city. The population density was 2,310.4 inhabitants per square mile (892.1/km^{2}). There were 3,376 housing units at an average density of 891.8 per square mile (344.3/km^{2}). The racial makeup of the city was 98.24% White, 0.48% African American, 0.18% Native American, 0.29% Asian, 0.21% from other races, and 0.61% from two or more races. Hispanic or Latino of any race were 0.87% of the population.

There were 3,189 households, out of which 43.1% had children under the age of 18 living with them, 64.2% were married couples living together, 10.7% had a female householder with no husband present, and 21.0% were non-families. 17.1% of all households were made up of individuals, and 6.8% had someone living alone who was 65 years of age or older. The average household size was 2.74 and the average family size was 3.08.

In the city the population was spread out, with 29.6% under the age of 18, 8.7% from 18 to 24, 34.3% from 25 to 44, 18.6% from 45 to 64, and 8.9% who were 65 years of age or older. The median age was 31 years. For every 100 females, there were 96.9 males. For every 100 females age 18 and over, there were 93.7 males.

The median income for a household in the city was $50,933, and the median income for a family was $54,794. Males had a median income of $40,621 versus $26,703 for females. The per capita income for the city was $20,451. About 3.1% of families and 3.7% of the population were below the poverty line, including 3.9% of those under age 18 and 8.0% of those age 65 or over.

== Education ==
Trenton is served by Edgewood High School.
