= Butler Township, Darke County, Ohio =

Township in Ohio, US

- Township
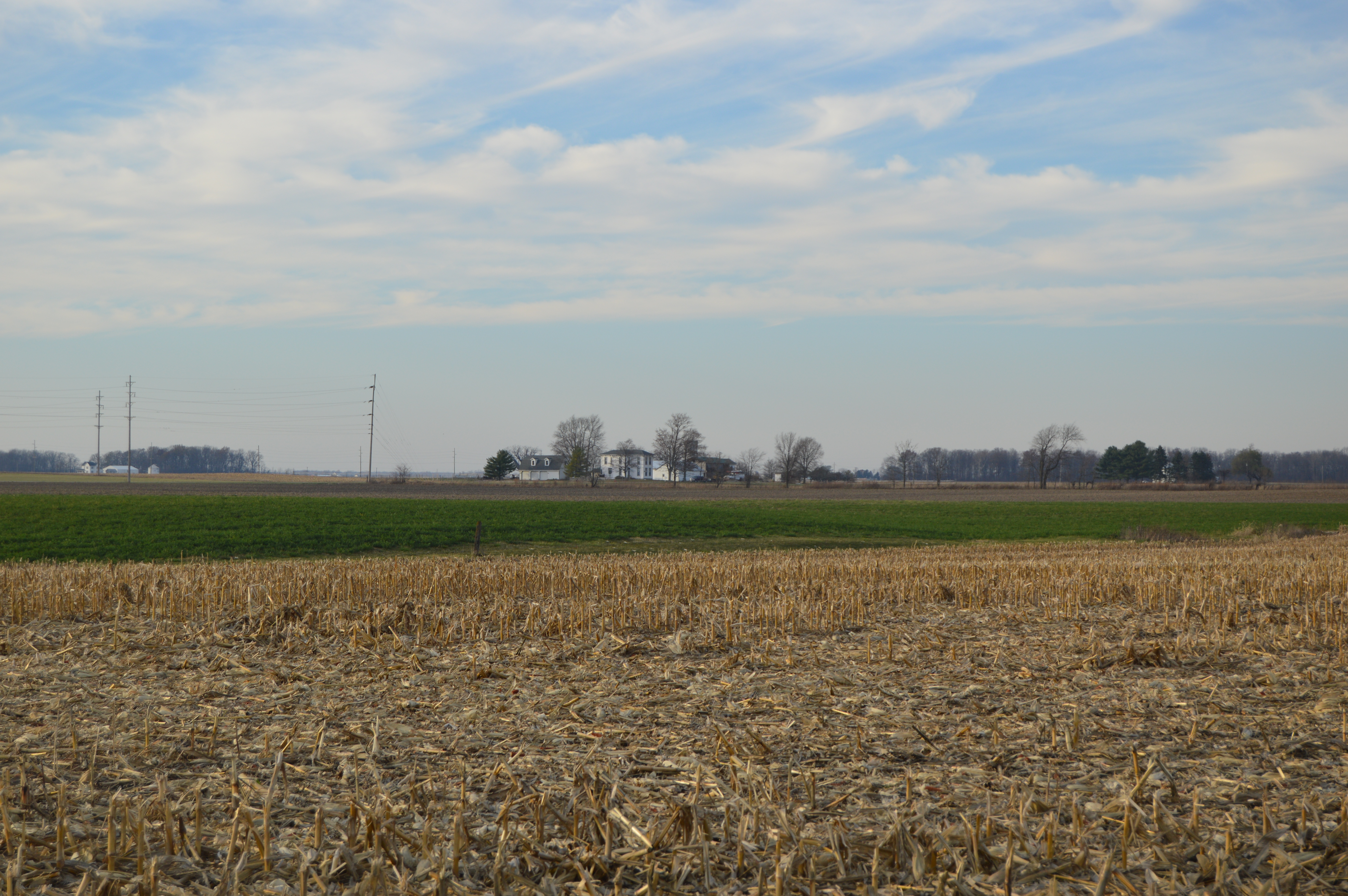
- Countryside between Castine and Ithaca

- Location in Darke County and the state of Ohio
- Coordinates: 39°57′29″N 84°39′44″W
- Country: United States
- State: Ohio
- County: Darke

Area
  - Total: 34.7 sq mi (89.8 km^{2})
  - Land: 34.6 sq mi (89.6 km^{2})
  - Water: 0.077 sq mi (0.2 km^{2})
- Elevation: 1,080 ft (330 m)

Population (2020)
  - Total: 1,455
  - Density: 42.1/sq mi (16.2/km^{2})
- Time zone: UTC-5 (Eastern (EST))
  - Summer (DST): UTC-4 (EDT)
- FIPS code: 39-10576
- GNIS feature ID: 1086012
- Website: https://www.butler-twp.net/

Butler Township is one of the twenty townships of Darke County, Ohio, United States. The 2020 census found 1,455 people in the township.

== Geography ==
Located in the southern part of the county, it borders the following townships:

- Neave Township - north
- Van Buren Township - northeast corner
- Twin Township - east
- Harrison Township, Preble County - southeast corner
- Monroe Township, Preble County - south
- Jefferson Township, Preble County - southwest corner
- Harrison Township - west
- Liberty Township - northwest corner

Two incorporated villages are located in Butler Township: Castine in the southeast, and part of New Madison in the west. The unincorporated community of Otterbein lies in the township's southwest.

== Name and history ==
Butler Township was established about 1820, and most likely was named after Butler County, Ohio, which had been named for General Richard Butler. It is one of six Butler Townships statewide.

== Government ==
The township is governed by a three-member board of trustees, who are elected in November of odd-numbered years to a four-year term beginning on the following January 1. Two are elected in the year after the presidential election and one is elected in the year before it. There is also an elected township fiscal officer, who serves a four-year term beginning on April 1 of the year after the election, which is held in November of the year before the presidential election. Vacancies in the fiscal officership or on the board of trustees are filled by the remaining trustees.
