= Wayne Lakes, Ohio =

- Village
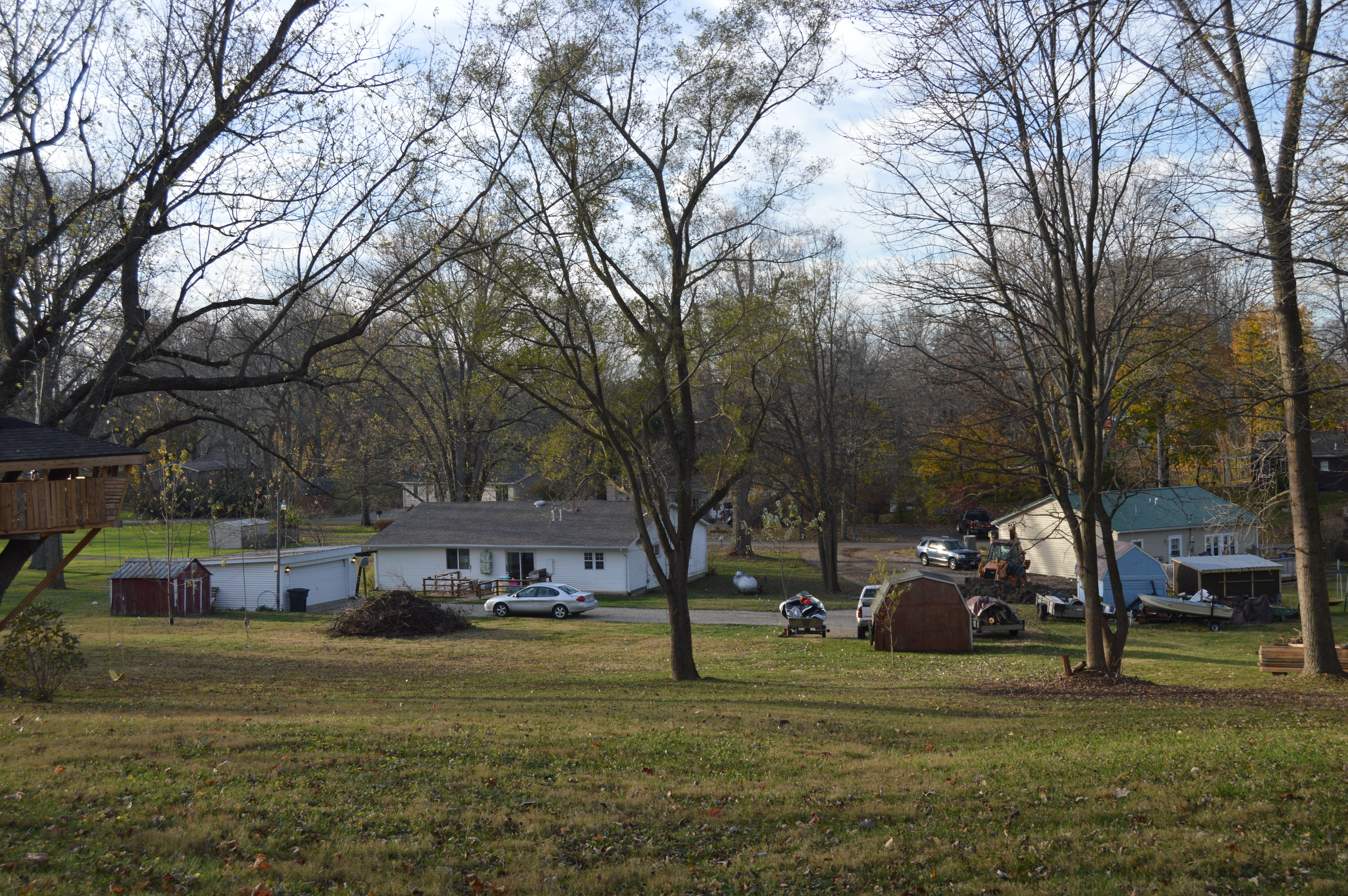
- East Drive near Main Drive

- Location in Darke County and the state of Ohio.
- Coordinates: 40°01′18″N 84°39′45″W
- Country: United States
- State: Ohio
- County: Darke
- Township: Neave

Government

Area
  - Total: 0.65 sq mi (1.68 km^{2})
  - Land: 0.53 sq mi (1.38 km^{2})
  - Water: 0.12 sq mi (0.30 km^{2})
- Elevation: 1,047 ft (319 m)

Population (2020)
  - Total: 693
  - Density: 1,304.1/sq mi (503.51/km^{2})
- Time zone: UTC-5 (Eastern (EST))
  - Summer (DST): UTC-4 (EDT)
- Area codes: 937, 326
- FIPS code: 39-82348
- GNIS feature ID: 2400114
- Website: villageofwaynelakes.dreamhosters.com

Wayne Lakes is a village in Darke County, Ohio, United States. The population was 693 at the 2020 census.

== Geography ==
According to the United States Census Bureau, the village has a total area of 0.65 square miles (1.68 km^{2}), of which 0.53 square miles (1.37 km^{2}) is land and 0.12 square miles (0.31 km^{2}) is water.

== Demographics ==
Historical population
Census	Pop.	Note	%±
1990	671		—
2000	684		1.9%
2010	718		5.0%
2020	693		−3.5%
U.S. Decennial Census

=== 2010 census ===
As of the census of 2010, there were 718 people, 304 households, and 214 families residing in the village. The population density was 1,354.7 inhabitants per square mile (523.1/km^{2}). There were 346 housing units at an average density of 652.8 per square mile (252.0/km^{2}). The racial makeup of the village was 98.2% White, 0.7% African American, 0.1% Native American, 0.1% from other races, and 0.8% from two or more races. Hispanic or Latino of any race were 0.4% of the population.

There were 304 households, of which 26.6% had children under the age of 18 living with them, 53.0% were married couples living together, 13.2% had a female householder with no husband present, 4.3% had a male householder with no wife present, and 29.6% were non-families. 22.4% of all households were made up of individuals, and 8.3% had someone living alone who was 65 years of age or older. The average household size was 2.36 and the average family size was 2.72.

The median age in the village was 43.6 years. 20.3% of residents were under the age of 18; 7.8% were between the ages of 18 and 24; 24% were from 25 to 44; 32.2% were from 45 to 64; and 15.9% were 65 years of age or older. The gender makeup of the village was 49.4% male and 50.6% female.

=== 2000 census ===
As of the census of 2000, there were 684 people, 283 households, and 200 families residing in the village. The population density was 1,252.7 inhabitants per square mile (483.7/km^{2}). There were 307 housing units at an average density of 562.2 per square mile (217.1/km^{2}). The racial makeup of the village was 97.95% White, 0.58% African American, 0.29% Native American, 0.15% Asian, and 1.02% from two or more races. Hispanic or Latino of any race were 0.88% of the population.

There were 283 households, out of which 28.6% had children under the age of 18 living with them, 56.5% were married couples living together, 8.8% had a female householder with no husband present, and 29.3% were non-families. 25.8% of all households were made up of individuals, and 7.8% had someone living alone who was 65 years of age or older. The average household size was 2.42 and the average family size was 2.89.

In the village, the population was spread out, with 23.8% under the age of 18, 6.4% from 18 to 24, 28.1% from 25 to 44, 30.3% from 45 to 64, and 11.4% who were 65 years of age or older. The median age was 40 years. For every 100 females there were 97.7 males. For every 100 females age 18 and over, there were 100.4 males.

The median income for a household in the village was $46,908, and the median income for a family was $54,375. Males had a median income of $32,917 versus $21,473 for females. The per capita income for the village was $17,625. About 2.3% of families and 2.5% of the population were below the poverty line, including 2.7% of those under age 18 and 7.1% of those age 65 or over.
