= Jacksonburg, Ohio =

- Village
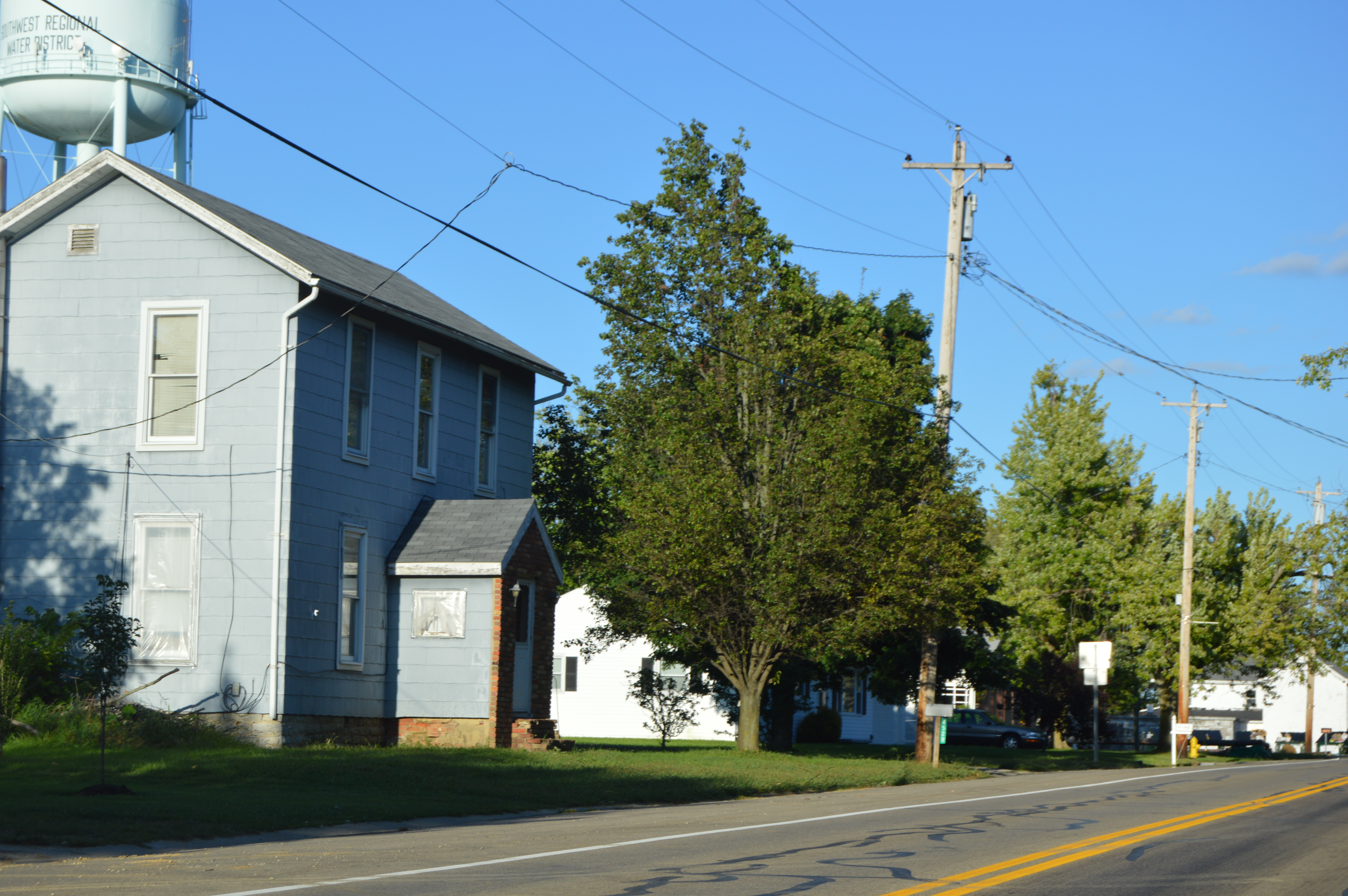
- Houses on State Route 744

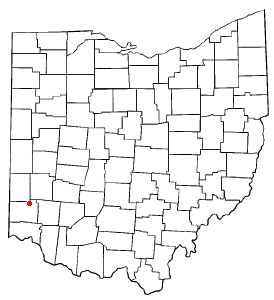
- Location of Jacksonburg, Ohio

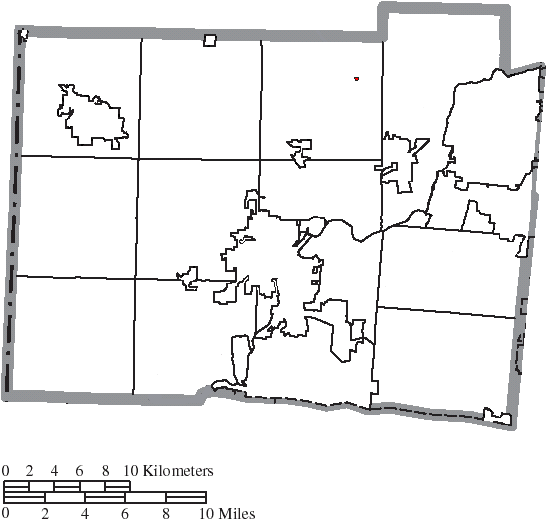
- Location of Jacksonburg in Butler County
- Coordinates: 39°32′18″N 84°30′12″W
- Country: United States
- State: Ohio
- County: Butler
- Township: Wayne

Government
  - Mayor: Michael W. Sword

Area
  - Total: 0.019 sq mi (0.05 km^{2})
  - Land: 0.019 sq mi (0.05 km^{2})
  - Water: 0 sq mi (0.00 km^{2})
- Elevation: 961 ft (293 m)

Population (2020)
  - Total: 55
  - Density: 2,758.4/sq mi (1,065.02/km^{2})
- Time zone: UTC-5 (Eastern (EST))
  - Summer (DST): UTC-4 (EDT)
- FIPS code: 39-38192
- GNIS feature ID: 2398287

Jacksonburg is a small village in Butler County, Ohio, United States. The population was 55 at the 2020 census.

== History ==
Jacksonburg was founded on February 16, 1816. The village was named after General Andrew Jackson, afterward seventh President of the United States.

== Geography ==
According to the United States Census Bureau, the village has a total area of 0.02 square miles (0.05 km^{2}), all land.

== Demographics ==
Historical population
Census	Pop.	Note	%±
1830	127		—
1840	136		7.1%
1850	185		36.0%
1860	153		−17.3%
1870	127		−17.0%
1880	108		−15.0%
1890	79		−26.9%
1900	77		−2.5%
1910	55		−28.6%
1920	44		−20.0%
1930	58		31.8%
1940	67		15.5%
1950	114		70.1%
1960	100		−12.3%
1970	92		−8.0%
1980	58		−37.0%
1990	50		−13.8%
2000	67		34.0%
2010	63		−6.0%
2020	55		−12.7%
U.S. Decennial Census

=== 2010 census ===
As of the census of 2010, there were 63 people, 21 households, and 17 families living in the village. The population density was 3,150.0 inhabitants per square mile (1,216.2/km^{2}). There were 22 housing units at an average density of 1,100.0 per square mile (424.7/km^{2}). The racial makeup of the village was 90.5% White, 4.8% Native American, and 4.8% from two or more races.

There were 21 households, of which 33.3% had children under the age of 18 living with them, 42.9% were married couples living together, 23.8% had a female householder with no husband present, 14.3% had a male householder with no wife present, and 19.0% were non-families. 19.0% of all households were made up of individuals, and 9.6% had someone living alone who was 65 years of age or older. The average household size was 3.00 and the average family size was 3.35.

The median age in the village was 29.8 years. 30.2% of residents were under the age of 18; 9.4% were between the ages of 18 and 24; 28.5% were from 25 to 44; 27% were from 45 to 64; and 4.8% were 65 years of age or older. The gender makeup of the village was 54.0% male and 46.0% female.

=== 2000 census ===
As of the census of 2000, there were 67 people, 22 households, and 17 families living in the village. The population density was 3,436.6 inhabitants per square mile (1,326.9/km^{2}). There were 22 housing units at an average density of 1,128.4 per square mile (435.7/km^{2}). The racial makeup of the village was 97.01% White, and 2.99% from two or more races.

There were 22 households, out of which 31.8% had children under the age of 18 living with them, 59.1% were married couples living together, 13.6% had a female householder with no husband present, and 18.2% were non-families. 18.2% of all households were made up of individuals, and 4.5% had someone living alone who was 65 years of age or older. The average household size was 3.05 and the average family size was 3.50.

In the village, the population was spread out, with 28.4% under the age of 18, 9.0% from 18 to 24, 29.9% from 25 to 44, 19.4% from 45 to 64, and 13.4% who were 65 years of age or older. The median age was 36 years. For every 100 females there were 123.3 males. For every 100 females age 18 and over, there were 118.2 males.

The median income for a household in the village was $38,125, and the median income for a family was $38,750. Males had a median income of $30,417 versus $28,750 for females. The per capita income for the village was $11,771. None of the population is below the poverty line.

== Notable person ==
- James Middleton Cox, Governor of Ohio
