= Ithaca, Ohio =

- Village
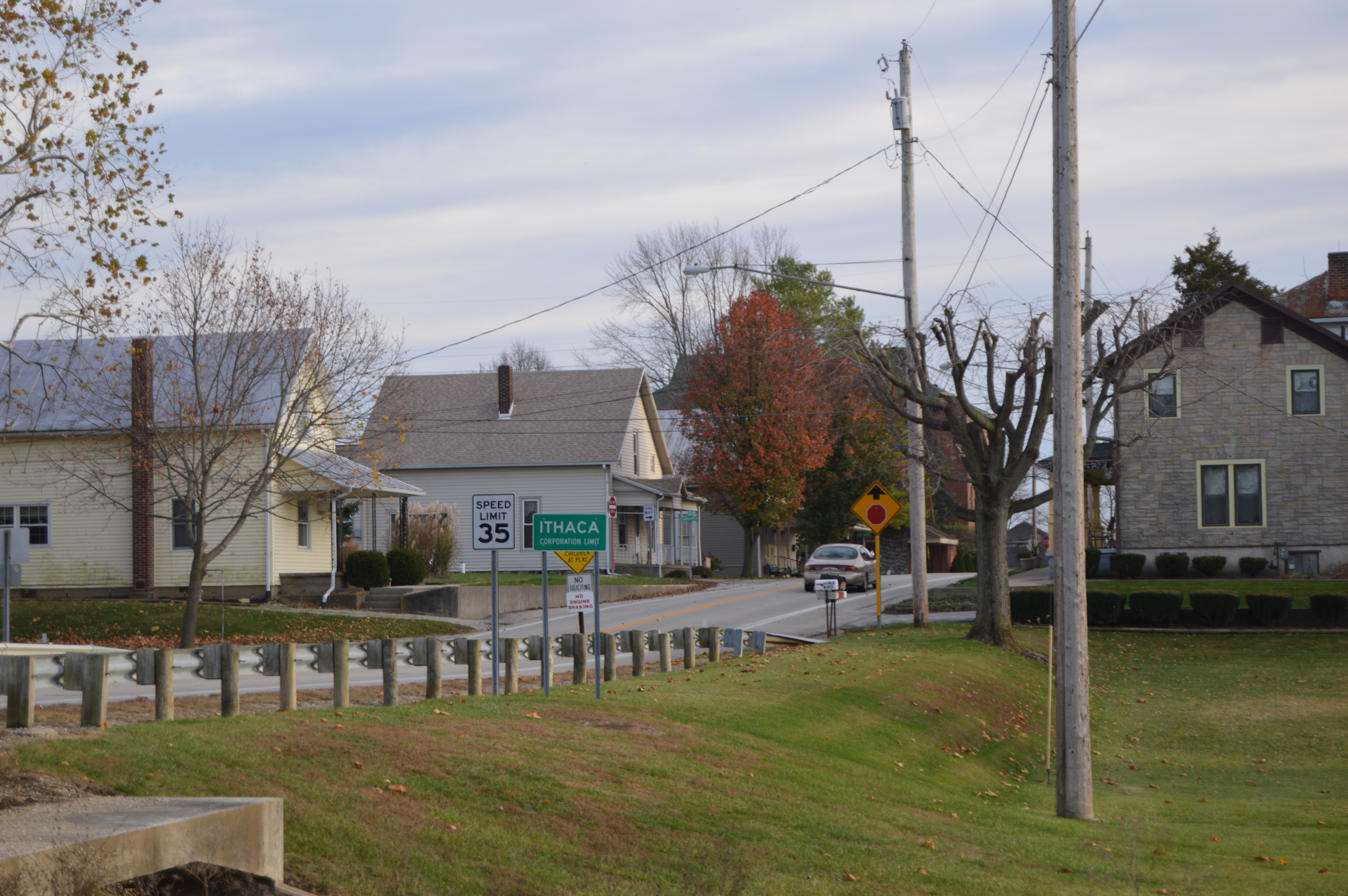
- Entering Ithaca from the north

- Location in Darke County and the state of Ohio
- Coordinates: 39°56′18″N 84°33′12″W
- Country: United States
- State: Ohio
- County: Darke
- Township: Twin

Area
  - Total: 0.031 sq mi (0.08 km^{2})
  - Land: 0.031 sq mi (0.08 km^{2})
  - Water: 0 sq mi (0.00 km^{2})
- Elevation: 1,034 ft (315 m)

Population (2020)
  - Total: 81
  - Density: 2,594/sq mi (1,001.5/km^{2})
- Time zone: UTC-5 (Eastern (EST))
  - Summer (DST): UTC-4 (EDT)
- ZIP code: 45304
- Area codes: 937, 326
- FIPS code: 39-37604
- GNIS feature ID: 2398281

Ithaca is a village in Darke County, Ohio, United States. The population was 81 at the 2020 census.

== History ==
John Colville platted Ithaca in 1832 and gave it the name of "Twinsborough." Its location on an established highway and along the Ohio Electric Railway caused the community to grow rapidly. The present name is a transfer from Ithaca, New York.

In 2024, David Peterson, mayor from 2012 to 2020, was indicted for theft in office. He pleaded guilty and was ordered to pay $38,845.46 in restitution.

== Geography ==
According to the United States Census Bureau, the village has a total area of 0.03 square miles (0.08 km^{2}), all land.

== Demographics ==
Historical population
Census	Pop.	Note	%±
1870	150		—
1880	128		−14.7%
1890	135		5.5%
1900	113		−16.3%
1910	100		−11.5%
1920	82		−18.0%
1930	76		−7.3%
1940	142		86.8%
1950	146		2.8%
1960	153		4.8%
1970	161		5.2%
1980	130		−19.3%
1990	119		−8.5%
2000	102		−14.3%
2010	136		33.3%
2020	81		−40.4%
U.S. Decennial Census

=== 2010 census ===
As of the census of 2010, there were 136 people, 44 households, and 35 families living in the village. The population density was 4,533.3 inhabitants per square mile (1,750.3/km^{2}). There were 52 housing units at an average density of 1,733.3 per square mile (669.2/km^{2}). The racial makeup of the village was 99.3% White and 0.7% Asian. Hispanic or Latino of any race were 3.7% of the population.

There were 44 households, of which 40.9% had children under the age of 18 living with them, 75.0% were married couples living together, 4.5% had a female householder with no husband present, and 20.5% were non-families. 6.8% of all households were made up of individuals. The average household size was 3.09 and the average family size was 3.37.

The median age in the village was 34.3 years. 27.9% of residents were under the age of 18; 12.6% were between the ages of 18 and 24; 27.2% were from 25 to 44; 19.9% were from 45 to 64; and 12.5% were 65 years of age or older. The gender makeup of the village was 46.3% male and 53.7% female.

=== 2000 census ===
As of the census of 2000, there were 102 people, 36 households, and 28 families living in the village. The population density was 3,363.0 inhabitants per square mile (1,298.5/km^{2}). There were 38 housing units at an average density of 1,252.9 per square mile (483.7/km^{2}). The racial makeup of the village was 100.00% White.

There were 36 households, out of which 41.7% had children under the age of 18 living with them, 63.9% were married couples living together, 8.3% had a female householder with no husband present, and 22.2% were non-families. 16.7% of all households were made up of individuals, and 8.3% had someone living alone who was 65 years of age or older. The average household size was 2.83 and the average family size was 3.21.

In the village, the population was spread out, with 30.4% under the age of 18, 8.8% from 18 to 24, 29.4% from 25 to 44, 22.5% from 45 to 64, and 8.8% who were 65 years of age or older. The median age was 36 years. For every 100 females there were 112.5 males. For every 100 females age 18 and over, there were 97.2 males.

The median income for a household in the village was $39,500, and the median income for a family was $47,083. Males had a median income of $33,750 versus $27,500 for females. The per capita income for the village was $14,647. None of the population and none of the families were below the poverty line.
