= Castine, Ohio =

- Village
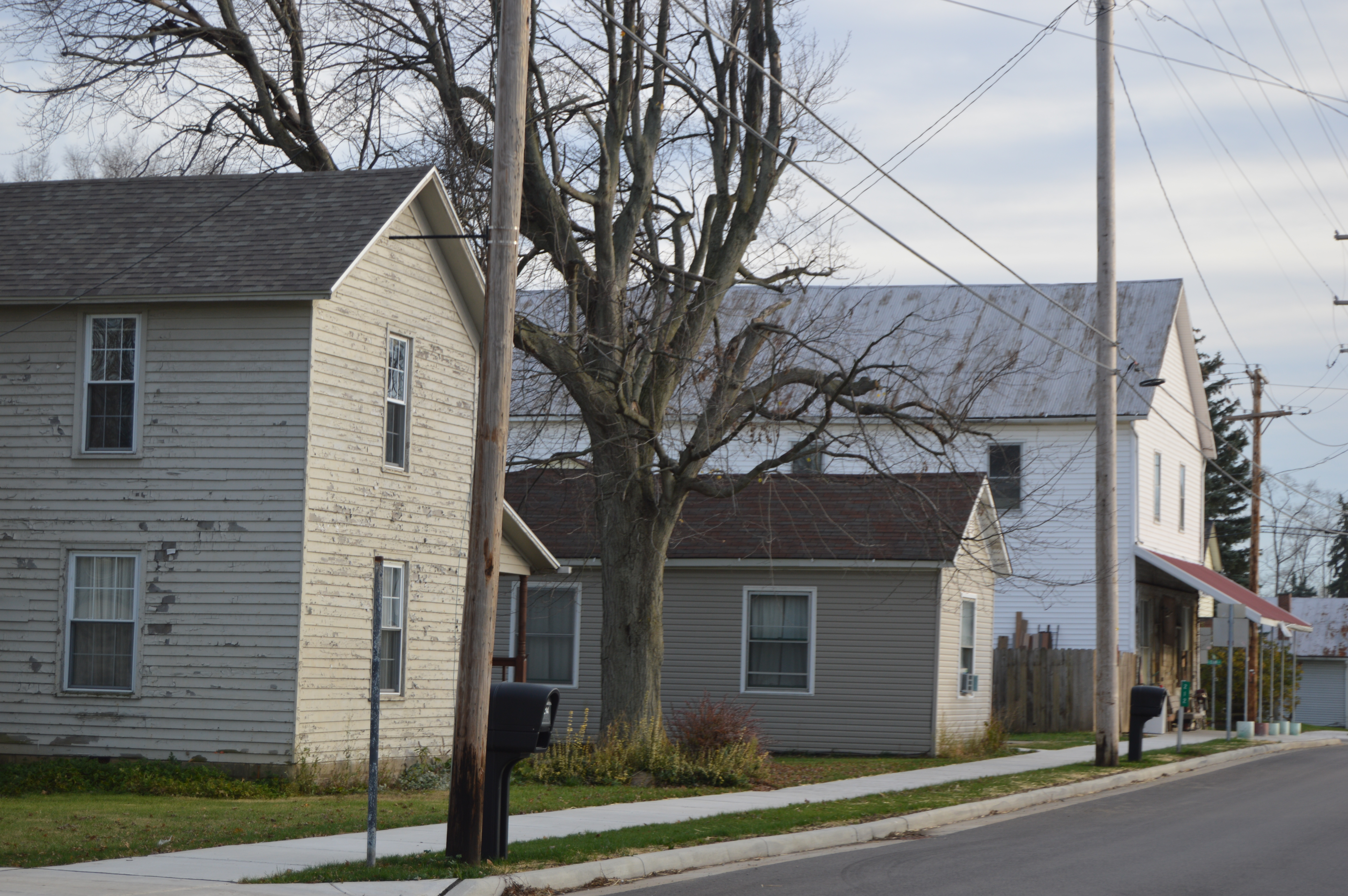
- Main Street houses

- Location in Darke County and the state of Ohio.
- Coordinates: 39°55′52″N 84°37′30″W
- Country: United States
- State: Ohio
- County: Darke
- Township: Butler

Area
  - Total: 0.077 sq mi (0.20 km^{2})
  - Land: 0.077 sq mi (0.20 km^{2})
  - Water: 0 sq mi (0.00 km^{2})
- Elevation: 1,079 ft (329 m)

Population (2020)
  - Total: 110
  - Estimate (2023): 107
  - Density: 1,451.1/sq mi (560.28/km^{2})
- Time zone: UTC-5 (Eastern (EST))
  - Summer (DST): UTC-4 (EDT)
- ZIP code: 45304
- Area codes: 937, 326
- FIPS code: 39-12504
- GNIS feature ID: 2397574

Castine (/ˈkæstiːn/ KASS-teen) is a village in Darke County, Ohio, United States. The population was 110 at the 2020 census.

== History ==
Castine was platted in 1832 and replatted in the following year. Its location was chosen because it lay at the intersection of the road between Greenville and Eaton with the road between the communities of Miami County, Ohio and New Garden, Indiana. For its first few decades, the village (then known as "New Castine") grew and prospered, but the building of the Little Miami Railroad through West Manchester, 2 miles (3.2 km) to the south, retarded Castine's progress. Revival came with the construction of the Cincinnati Northern Railroad in 1894.

== Geography ==
According to the United States Census Bureau, the village has a total area of 0.08 square miles (0.21 km^{2}), all land.

== Demographics ==
Historical population
Census	Pop.	Note	%±
1870	177		—
1880	127		−28.2%
1910	142		—
1920	146		2.8%
1930	91		−37.7%
1940	124		36.3%
1950	146		17.7%
1960	169		15.8%
1970	150		−11.2%
1980	147		−2.0%
1990	163		10.9%
2000	129		−20.9%
2010	130		0.8%
2020	110		−15.4%
2023 (est.)	107	▼	−2.7%
U.S. Decennial Census

=== 2010 census ===
As of the census of 2010, there were 130 people, 54 households, and 36 families living in the village. The population density was 1,625.0 inhabitants per square mile (627.4/km^{2}). There were 59 housing units at an average density of 737.5 per square mile (284.8/km^{2}). The racial makeup of the village was 97.7% White, 0.8% Native American, 0.8% from other races, and 0.8% from two or more races.

There were 54 households, of which 29.6% had children under the age of 18 living with them, 53.7% were married couples living together, 7.4% had a female householder with no husband present, 5.6% had a male householder with no wife present, and 33.3% were non-families. 31.5% of all households were made up of individuals, and 18.5% had someone living alone who was 65 years of age or older. The average household size was 2.41 and the average family size was 2.97.

The median age in the village was 35.5 years. 23.8% of residents were under the age of 18; 5.5% were between the ages of 18 and 24; 31.6% were from 25 to 44; 23.1% were from 45 to 64; and 16.2% were 65 years of age or older. The gender makeup of the village was 49.2% male and 50.8% female.

=== 2000 census ===
As of the census of 2000, there were 129 people, 43 households, and 39 families living in the village. The population density was 1,700.1 inhabitants per square mile (656.4/km^{2}). There were 46 housing units at an average density of 606.2 per square mile (234.1/km^{2}). The racial makeup of the village was 98.45% White, 0.78% African American, and 0.78% from two or more races. Hispanic or Latino of any race were 1.55% of the population.

There were 43 households, out of which 55.8% had children under the age of 18 living with them, 79.1% were married couples living together, 7.0% had a female householder with no husband present, and 7.0% were non-families. 7.0% of all households were made up of individuals, and 4.7% had someone living alone who was 65 years of age or older. The average household size was 3.00 and the average family size was 3.08.

In the village, the population was spread out, with 33.3% under the age of 18, 7.0% from 18 to 24, 36.4% from 25 to 44, 17.1% from 45 to 64, and 6.2% who were 65 years of age or older. The median age was 33 years. For every 100 females there were 118.6 males. For every 100 females age 18 and over, there were 104.8 males.

The median income for a household in the village was $41,250, and the median income for a family was $42,813. Males had a median income of $35,313 versus $24,792 for females. The per capita income for the village was $11,950. There were 7.7% of families and 7.0% of the population living below the poverty line, including no under eighteens and none of those over 64.
