= New Madison, Ohio =

- Village
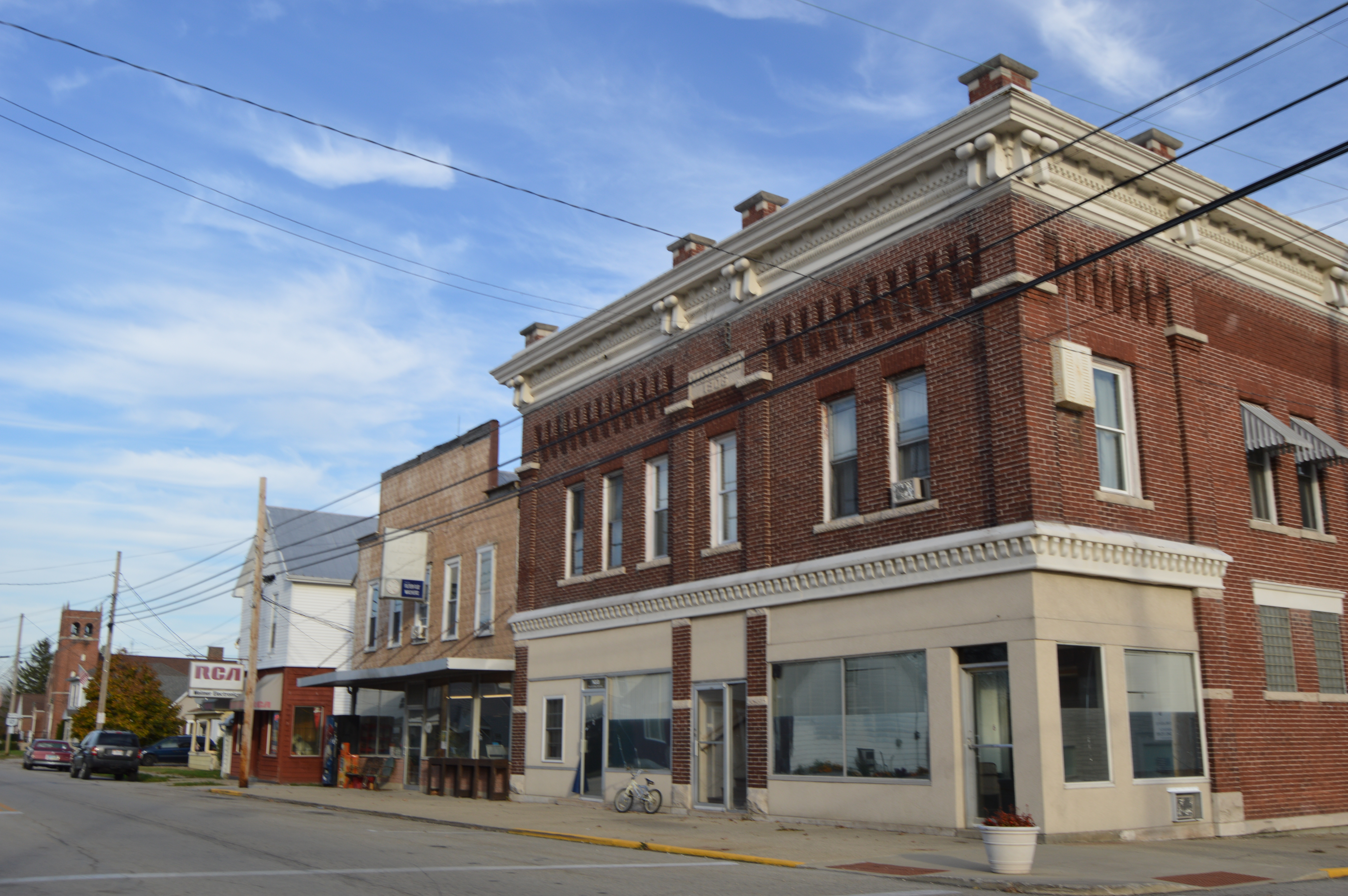
- Main Street

- Location in Darke County and the state of Ohio.
- Coordinates: 39°58′02″N 84°42′29″W
- Country: United States
- State: Ohio
- County: Darke

Area
  - Total: 0.47 sq mi (1.23 km^{2})
  - Land: 0.47 sq mi (1.23 km^{2})
  - Water: 0 sq mi (0.00 km^{2})
- Elevation: 1,102 ft (336 m)

Population (2020)
  - Total: 840
  - Density: 1,772.5/sq mi (684.37/km^{2})
- Time zone: UTC-5 (Eastern (EST))
  - Summer (DST): UTC-4 (EDT)
- ZIP code: 45346
- Area codes: 937, 326
- FIPS code: 39-54978
- GNIS feature ID: 2399474
- Website: https://villageofnewmadison.com/

New Madison is a village in Darke County, Ohio, United States. The population was 840 at the 2020 census.

== History ==
New Madison was platted by Zadock Smith in 1817 for purposes of land speculation, but his efforts failed; he was unable to sell any of the lots. Two years later, he sold the land to Ernestus Putnam, who replatted the village and began to sell lots in 1831; unlike Smith, Putnam saw the establishment of a successful community. The village was named after Madison, Indiana by Ernestus Putman. Ernestus Putman previously lived in Madison, In. and he named it New Madison after he bought the village. The first church in the community was a Presbyterian congregation. While the community's first school was founded in its early years, the building was replaced by a substantial two-story structure in 1870; it in turn was replaced by a larger built in 1897.

== Geography ==
According to the United States Census Bureau, the village has a total area of 0.41 square miles (1.06 km^{2}), all land.

== Demographics ==
Historical population
Census	Pop.	Note	%±
1870	452		—
1880	544		20.4%
1890	478		−12.1%
1900	590		23.4%
1910	628		6.4%
1920	608		−3.2%
1930	516		−15.1%
1940	616		19.4%
1950	757		22.9%
1960	910		20.2%
1970	959		5.4%
1980	1,008		5.1%
1990	928		−7.9%
2000	817		−12.0%
2010	892		9.2%
2020	840		−5.8%
U.S. Decennial Census

=== 2010 census ===
As of the census of 2010, there were 892 people, 352 households, and 252 families living in the village. The population density was 2,175.6 inhabitants per square mile (840.0/km^{2}). There were 381 housing units at an average density of 929.3 per square mile (358.8/km^{2}). The racial makeup of the village was 97.8% White, 0.7% African American, 0.1% Native American, 0.3% Asian, 0.4% from other races, and 0.7% from two or more races. Hispanic or Latino of any race were 0.9% of the population.

There were 352 households, of which 39.5% had children under the age of 18 living with them, 51.4% were married couples living together, 14.5% had a female householder with no husband present, 5.7% had a male householder with no wife present, and 28.4% were non-families. 23.9% of all households were made up of individuals, and 11.9% had someone living alone who was 65 years of age or older. The average household size was 2.53 and the average family size was 2.96.

The median age in the village was 36 years. 28.3% of residents were under the age of 18; 8.6% were between the ages of 18 and 24; 26.1% were from 25 to 44; 23.7% were from 45 to 64; and 13.3% were 65 years of age or older. The gender makeup of the village was 47.6% male and 52.4% female.

=== 2000 census ===
As of the census of 2000, there were 817 people, 344 households, and 239 families living in the village. The population density was 2,196.4 inhabitants per square mile (848.0/km^{2}). There were 368 housing units at an average density of 989.3 per square mile (382.0/km^{2}). The racial makeup of the village was 97.43% White, 0.12% African American, 0.61% Asian, and 1.84% from two or more races.

There were 344 households, out of which 29.9% had children under the age of 18 living with them, 56.7% were married couples living together, 7.8% had a female householder with no husband present, and 30.5% were non-families. 25.6% of all households were made up of individuals, and 11.9% had someone living alone who was 65 years of age or older. The average household size was 2.38 and the average family size was 2.81.

In the village, the population was spread out, with 24.0% under the age of 18, 8.2% from 18 to 24, 28.0% from 25 to 44, 23.3% from 45 to 64, and 16.5% who were 65 years of age or older. The median age was 38 years. For every 100 females there were 94.5 males. For every 100 females age 18 and over, there were 92.9 males.

The median income for a household in the village was $33,625, and the median income for a family was $44,531. Males had a median income of $34,545 versus $25,272 for females. The per capita income for the village was $17,233. About 6.4% of families and 7.7% of the population were below the poverty line, including 11.8% of those under age 18 and 3.3% of those age 65 or over.

== Notable people ==
- Gene Force, racecar driver
- Clayton Murphy, Olympic Runner
