= Clay Township, Montgomery County, Ohio =

Township in Ohio, US

- Township
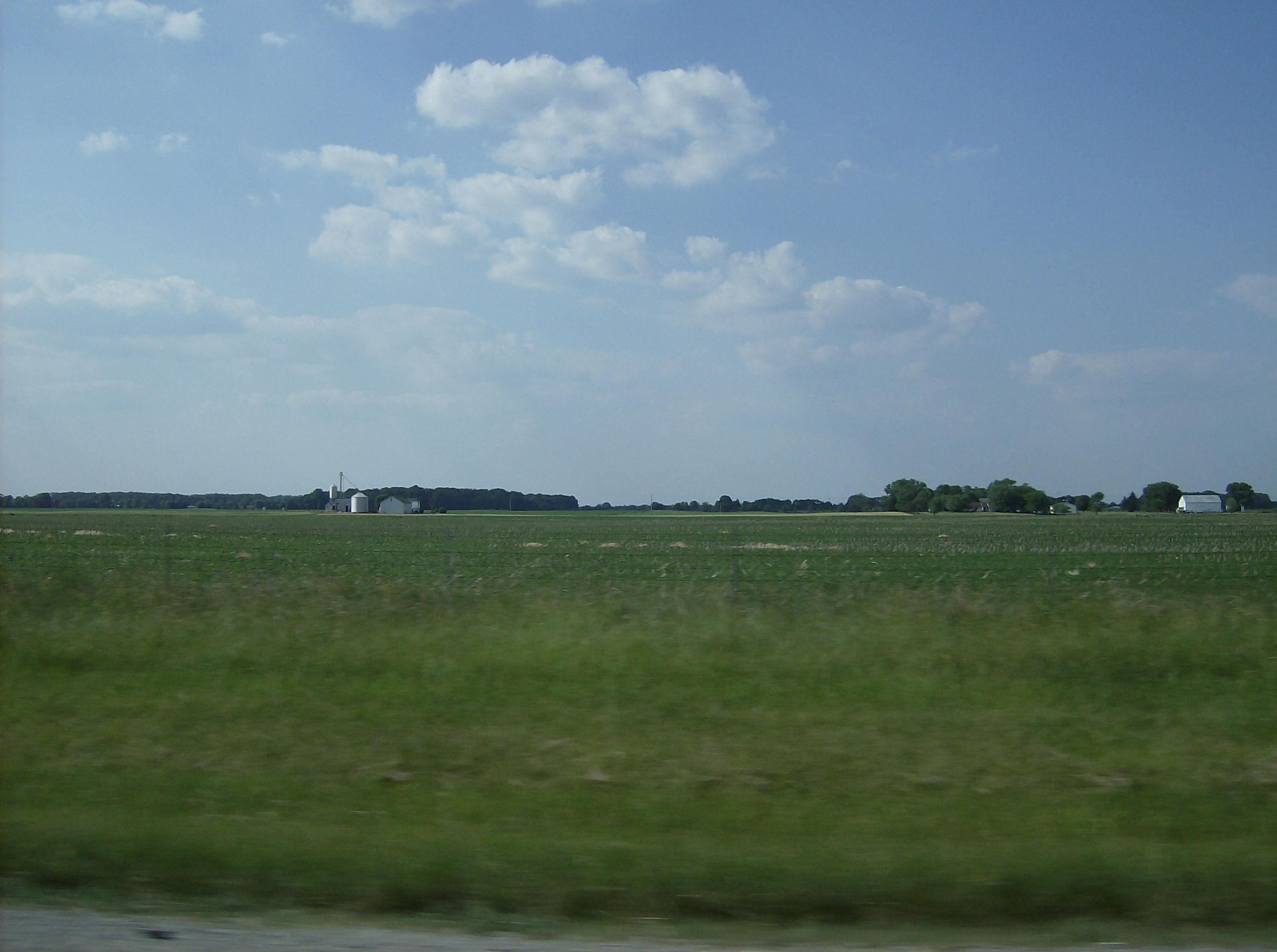
- Although located near Dayton, Clay Township is rural enough that it has many farms.

- Location in Montgomery County and the state of Ohio.
- Coordinates: 39°51′51″N 84°24′59″W
- Country: United States
- State: Ohio
- County: Montgomery

Area
  - Total: 37.8 sq mi (98.0 km^{2})
  - Land: 37.8 sq mi (98.0 km^{2})
  - Water: 0 sq mi (0.0 km^{2})
- Elevation: 1,050 ft (320 m)

Population (2020)
  - Total: 8,876
  - Density: 235/sq mi (90.6/km^{2})
- Time zone: UTC-5 (Eastern (EST))
  - Summer (DST): UTC-4 (EDT)
- FIPS code: 39-15518
- GNIS feature ID: 1086665

Clay Township is one of the nine townships of Montgomery County, Ohio, United States. As of the 2020 census the population was 8,876.

== Geography ==
Located in the northwestern corner of the county, it borders the following townships and cities:

- Union Township, Miami County - northeast
- Clayton - east
- Trotwood - southeast corner
- Perry Township - south
- Twin Township, Preble County - southwest corner
- Harrison Township, Preble County - west
- Monroe Township, Darke County - northwest

It is the only township in the county with a border on Darke County.

Three municipalities are located in Clay Township:

- Part of the city of Brookville, in the south
- The village of Phillipsburg, in the northeast
- Part of the village of Verona, in the northwest

The following unincorporated communities are located in Clay Township:

- Arlington
- Bachman
- Dodson

== Fire & Public Safety ==
Fire & Emergency Medical Service throughout Clay Township is available under contract with the following full service departments (arranged by order of size of catchment area):

- Brookville, in the south,
- Phillipsburg, in the northeast,
- Verona, in the northwest

Clay Township maintains a full-service police force with an enforcement area throughout unincorporated areas of the township. Brookville and Phillipsburg also have a dedicated police force for their respective communities.

== Education ==
The township is served by the following public school districts:

- Northmont City School District
- Tri-County North Local School District
- Brookville Local School District

== Economy ==
Interstate 70 crosses Clay Township east-west in the south and the National Road (US-40) crosses east–west just north of I-70. OH-49, also known as Dayton-Greenville Pike, is a main north–south connector from Greenville to the north in Darke County to I-70.

Clay Township has established a Joint Economic Development District (a "JEDD") with the neighboring city of Clayton at the intersection of Interstate 70 and OH-49.

== Name and history ==
Established on June 8, 1825. It is one of nine Clay Townships statewide. It is named after the statesman Henry Clay.

== Government ==
The township is governed by a three-member board of trustees, who are elected in November of odd-numbered years to a four-year term beginning on the following January 1. Two are elected in the year after the presidential election and one is elected in the year before it. There is also an elected township fiscal officer, who serves a four-year term beginning on April 1 of the year after the election, which is held in November of the year before the presidential election. Vacancies in the fiscal officership or on the board of trustees are filled by the remaining trustees.
