= Israel Township, Preble County, Ohio =

Township in Ohio, US

- Township
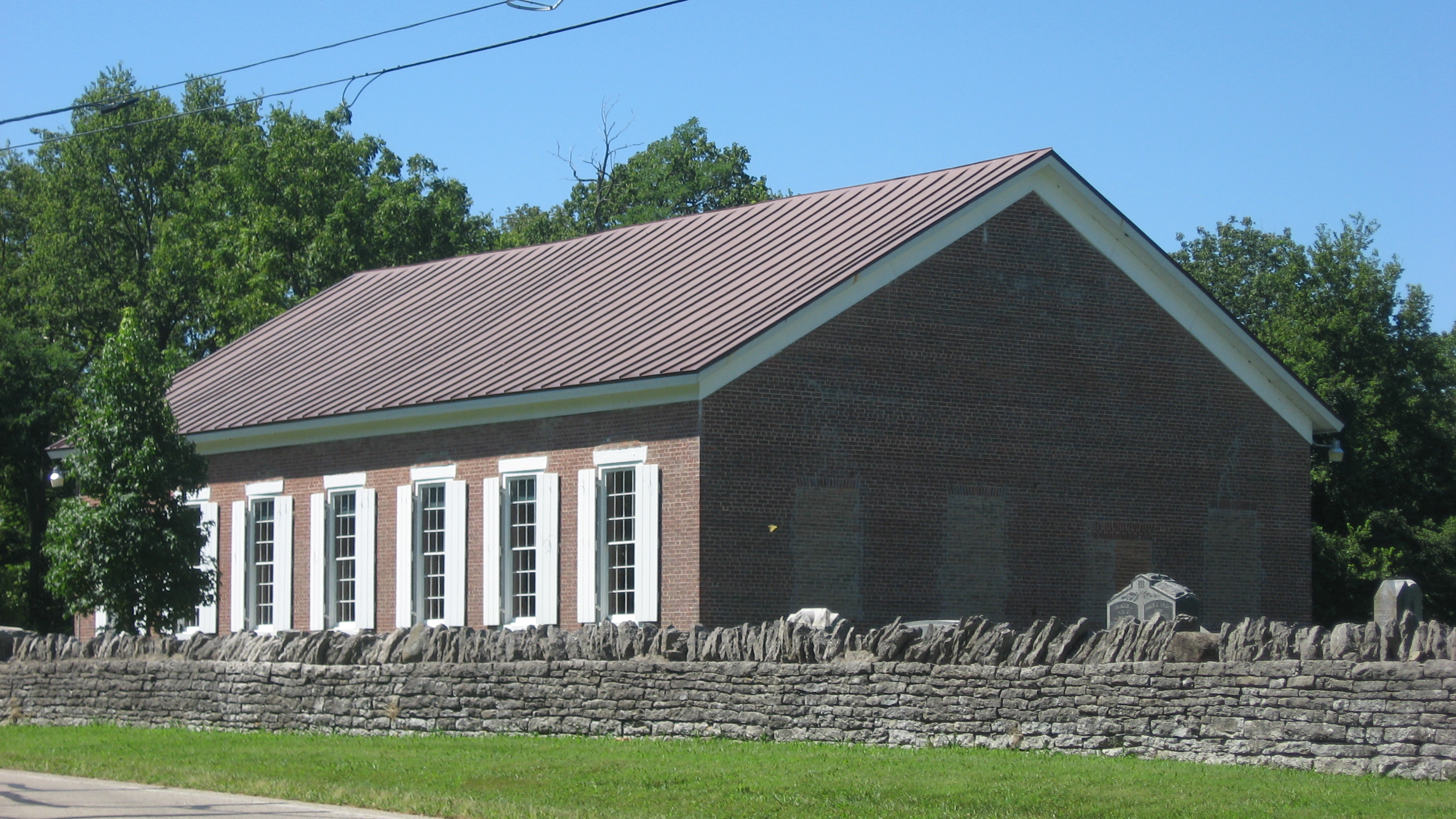
- Former Hopewell Associate Reformed Presbyterian Church

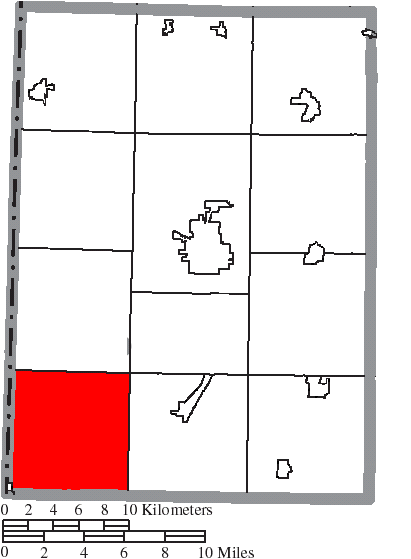
- Location of Israel Township in Preble County
- Coordinates: 39°36′8″N 84°46′7″W
- Country: United States
- State: Ohio
- County: Preble

Area
  - Total: 36.5 sq mi (94.5 km^{2})
  - Land: 35.7 sq mi (92.4 km^{2})
  - Water: 0.81 sq mi (2.1 km^{2})
- Elevation: 981 ft (299 m)

Population (2020)
  - Total: 1,131
  - Density: 32/sq mi (12.2/km^{2})
- Time zone: UTC-5 (Eastern (EST))
  - Summer (DST): UTC-4 (EDT)
- FIPS code: 39-37590
- GNIS feature ID: 1086849

Israel Township is one of the twelve townships of Preble County, Ohio, United States. The 2020 census found 1,131 people in the township.

== Geography ==
Located in the southwestern corner of the county, Israel Township borders the following townships:

- Dixon Township - north
- Gasper Township - northeast corner
- Somers Township - east
- Milford Township, Butler County - southeast corner
- Oxford Township, Butler County - south
- Union Township, Union County, Indiana - southwest
- Center Township, Union County, Indiana - northwest

Part of the village of College Corner is located in the southwestern corner of Israel Township, and the unincorporated community of Fairhaven lies in the eastern part of the township.

== Name and history ==
Israel Township was named for a U.S. Navy officer. It is the only Israel Township statewide.

== Government ==
The township is governed by a three-member board of trustees, who are elected in November of odd-numbered years to a four-year term beginning on the following January 1. Two are elected in the year after the presidential election and one is elected in the year before it. There is also an elected township fiscal officer, who serves a four-year term beginning on April 1 of the year after the election, which is held in November of the year before the presidential election. Vacancies in the fiscal officership or on the board of trustees are filled by the remaining trustees.
