= Oxford Township, Butler County, Ohio =

Township in Ohio, US

- Township
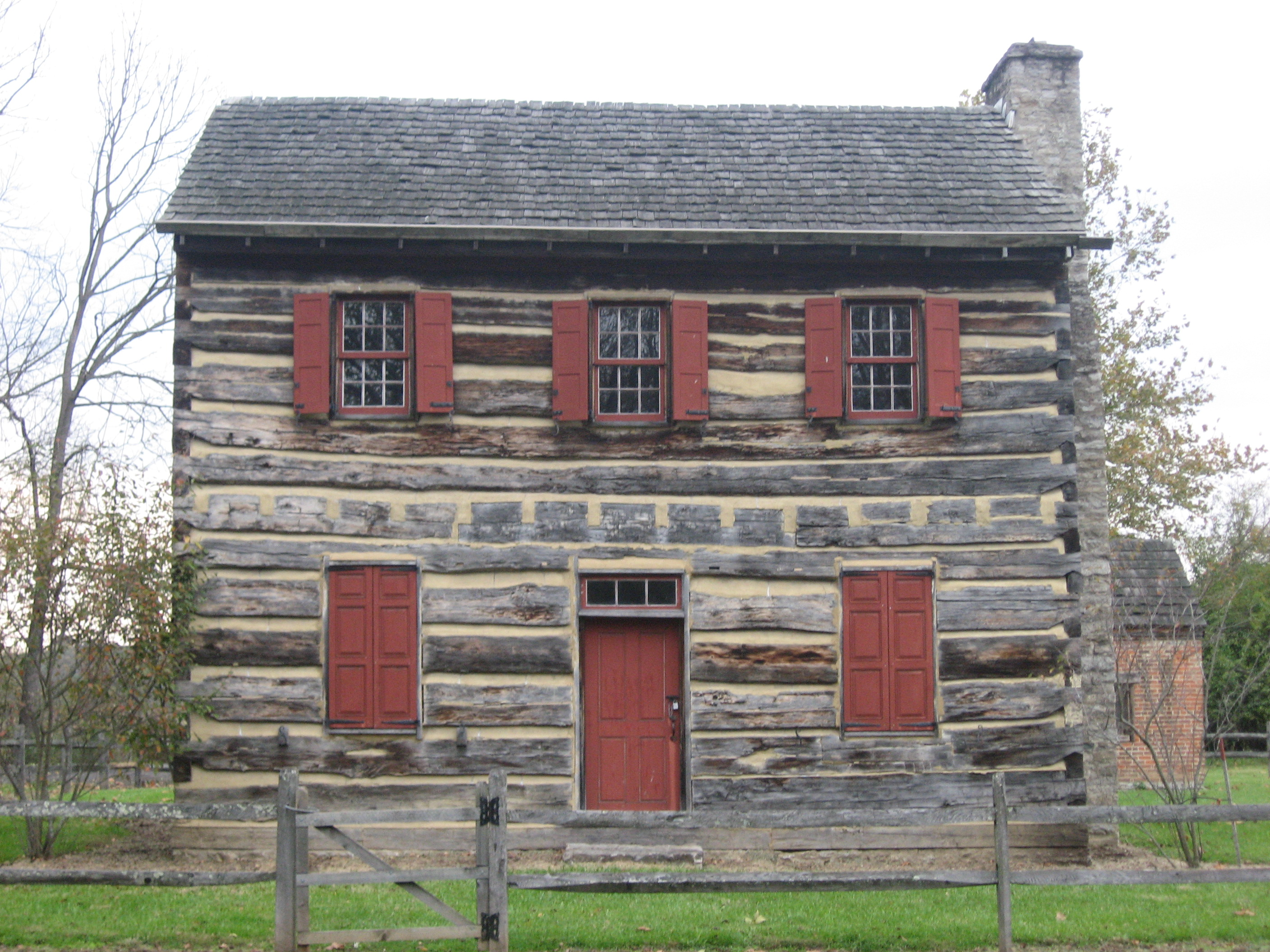
- Zachariah Price Dewitt Cabin, built 1805

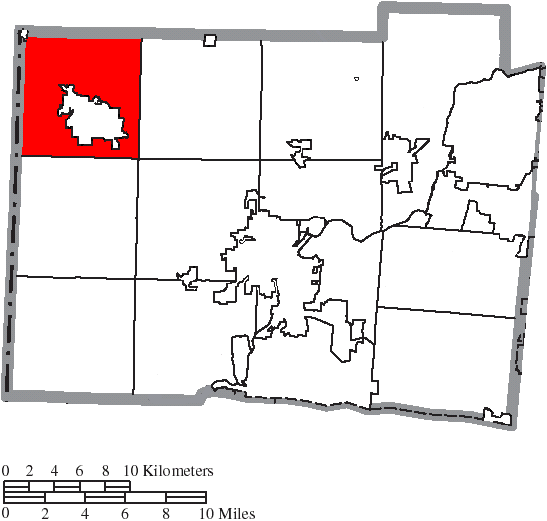
- Location of Oxford Township in Butler County
- Coordinates: 39°30′40″N 84°45′0″W
- Country: United States
- State: Ohio
- County: Butler

Area
  - Total: 36.9 sq mi (95.6 km^{2})
  - Land: 36.6 sq mi (94.7 km^{2})
  - Water: 0.31 sq mi (0.8 km^{2})
- Elevation: 909 ft (277 m)

Population (2020)
  - Total: 25,469
  - Density: 647/sq mi (249.8/km^{2})
- Time zone: UTC-5 (Eastern (EST))
  - Summer (DST): UTC-4 (EDT)
- ZIP code: 45056
- Area code: 513
- FIPS code: 39-59241
- GNIS feature ID: 1085817
- Website: www.oxfordtwpohio.org

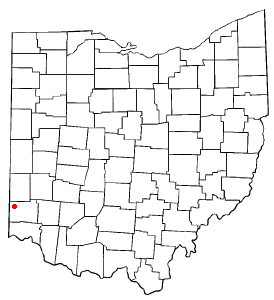
Oxford Township, Butler County, Ohio

Oxford Township, also known as the College Township, is one of thirteen townships in Butler County, Ohio, United States. It is located in the northwestern corner of the county, where it meets Preble County, Ohio, and Union County, Indiana. The city of Oxford, the home of Miami University, is located in the township. It had a population of 25,469 at the 2020 census.

== History ==
The eleventh in order of creation, Oxford Township was erected from Milford Township by the Butler County Commissioners on August 5, 1811.

The site was chosen by the State of Ohio for a college in order to fulfill the unkept promise of John Cleves Symmes.

== Geography ==
Located in the northwestern corner of the county, it borders the following townships:

- Israel Township, Preble County - north
- Somers Township, Preble County - northeast corner
- Milford Township - east
- Hanover Township - southeast corner
- Reily Township - south
- Springfield Township, Franklin County, Indiana - southwest corner
- Bath Township, Franklin County, Indiana - west
- Union Township, Union County, Indiana - northwest

The highest point in Butler County, altitude 1,051 feet (320 m), is in Oxford Township.

== Name ==
It is one of six Oxford Townships statewide.

== Government ==
The township is governed by a three-member board of trustees, who are elected in November of odd-numbered years to a four-year term beginning on the following January 1. Two are elected in the year after the presidential election and one is elected in the year before it. There is also an elected township fiscal officer, who serves a four-year term beginning on April 1 of the year after the election, which is held in November of the year before the presidential election. Vacancies in the fiscal officership or on the board of trustees are filled by the remaining trustees.
