= Pyrmont, Ohio =

Unincorporated community in Ohio, U.S.

Coordinates: 39°48′43″N 84°27′39″W

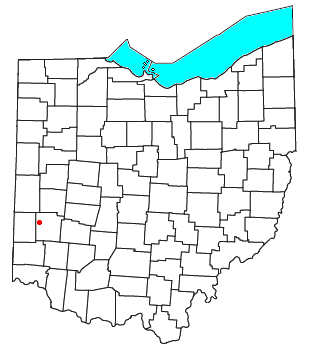
Location of Pyrmont, Ohio

Pyrmont is an unincorporated community in northwestern Perry Township, Montgomery County, Ohio, United States. It centers at the intersection of Brookville–Pyrmont Pike and Sulphur Springs Road, extending to the intersection of Brookville–Pyrmont Pike (now called Lexington–Salem Road) and Providence Pike. Located in the far west of the county, it lies several miles from the city of Dayton; the nearest city is Brookville, three miles (5 kilometers) to the northeast. Pyrmont is a part of the Brookville Local School District. Pyrmont, which was on a stagecoach route, was a busy town before Interstate 70 was built near Brookville.

The community is part of the Dayton Metropolitan Statistical Area.

== History ==
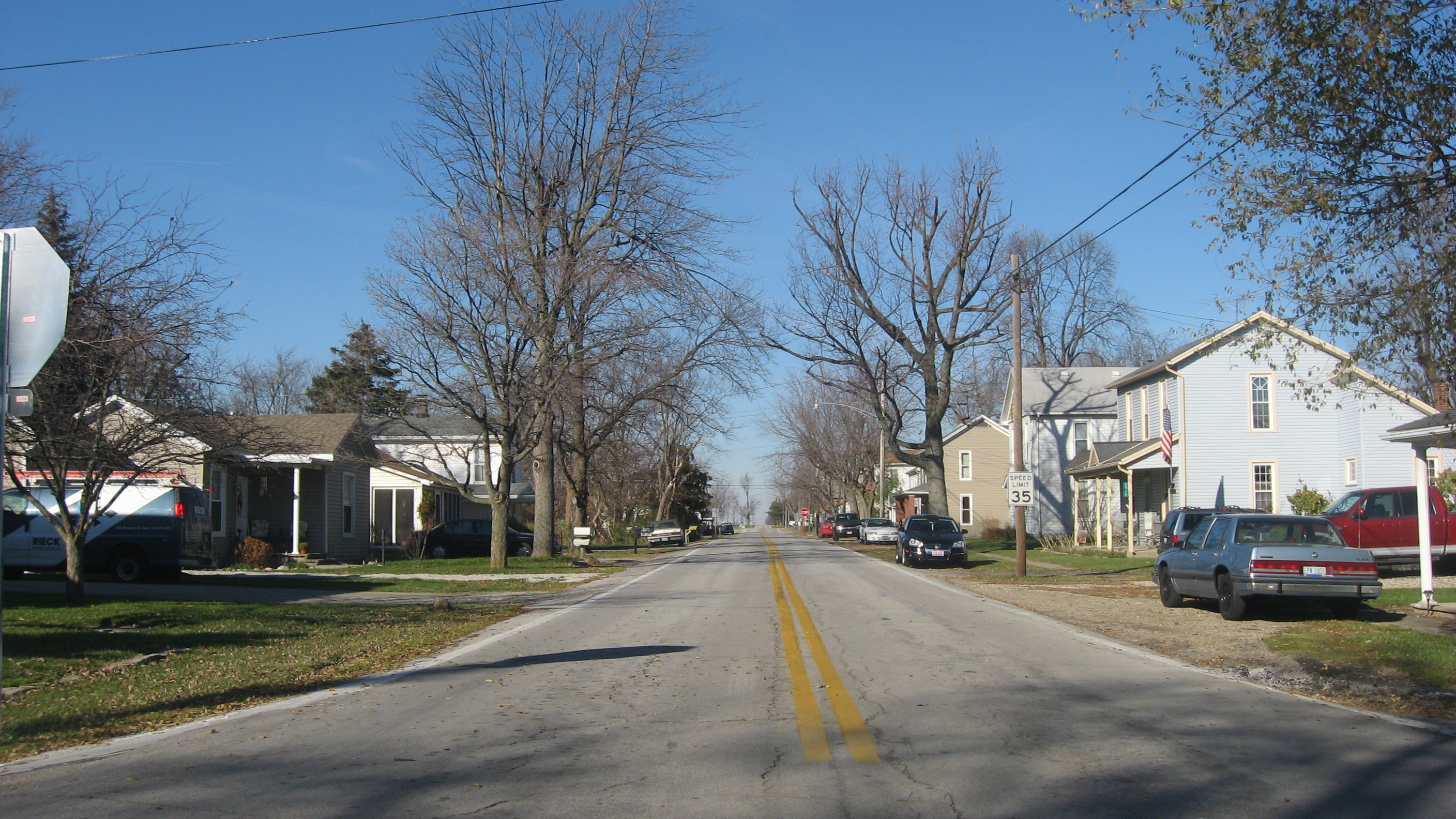
Sulphur Springs Road

Pyrmont was laid out in 1835, and named after Pyrmont, Germany, the native home of a first settler. A post office called Pyrmont was established in 1844, and remained in operation until 1910.
