= Franklin Township, Warren County, Ohio =

Township in Ohio, US

- Township
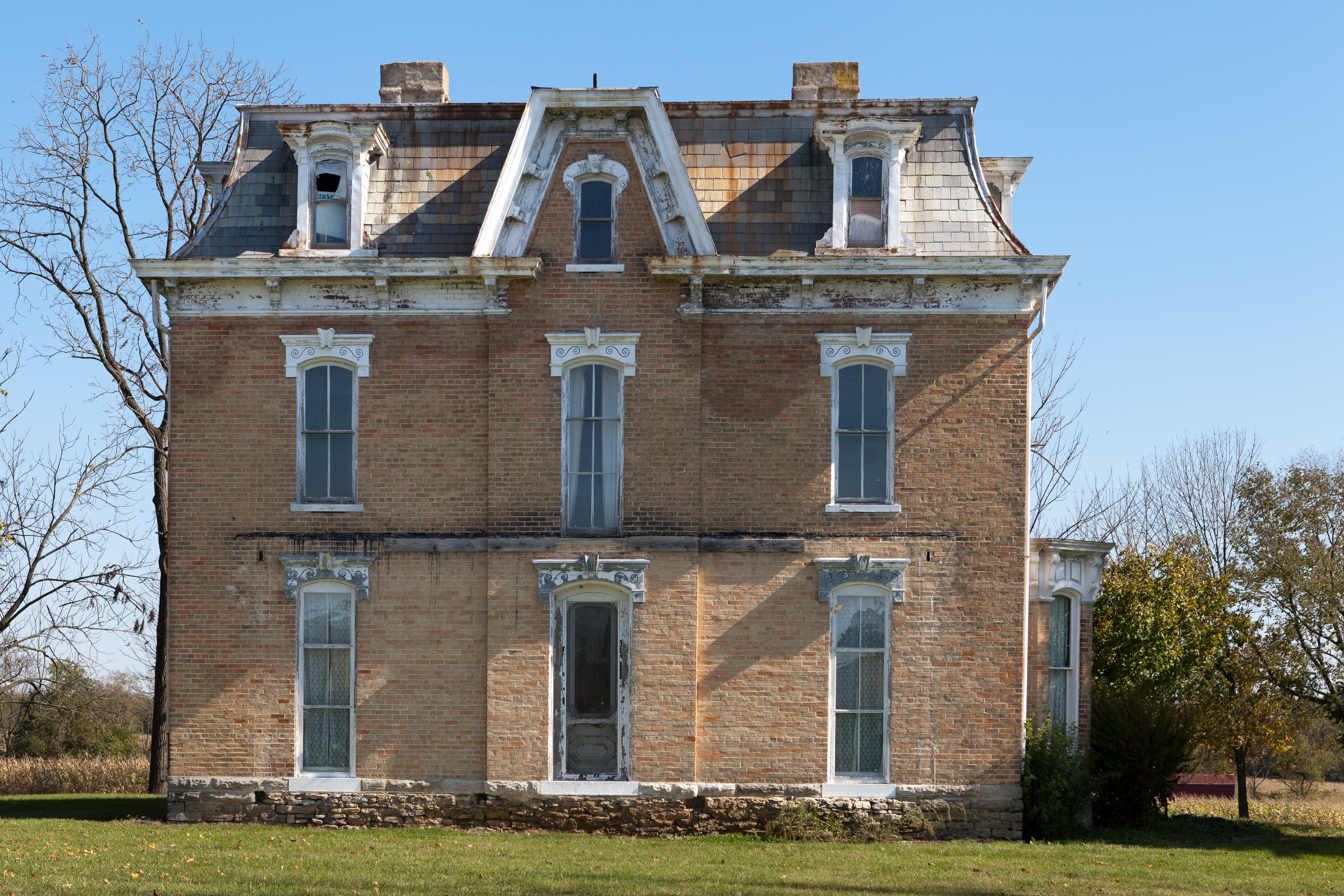
- Daniel L. Deardoff House

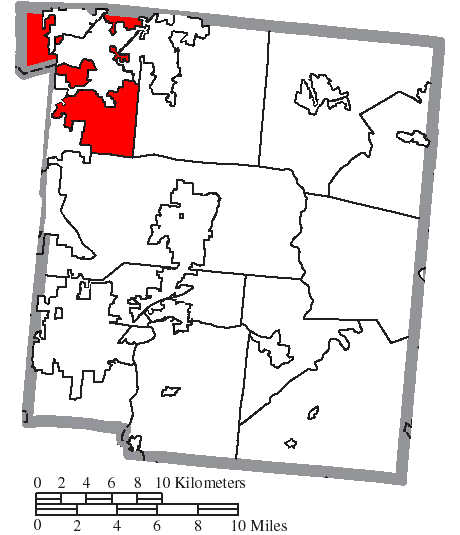
- Location of Franklin Township in Warren County
- Coordinates: 39°33′1″N 84°18′31″W
- Country: United States
- State: Ohio
- County: Warren

Area
  - Total: 33.6 sq mi (87 km^{2})
  - Land: 33.1 sq mi (86 km^{2})
  - Water: 0.5 sq mi (1.3 km^{2})
- Elevation: 679 ft (207 m)

Population (2020)
  - Total: 31,676
  - Density: 957/sq mi (369/km^{2})
- Time zone: UTC-5 (Eastern (EST))
  - Summer (DST): UTC-4 (EDT)
- ZIP code: 45005
- Area codes: 937, 326
- FIPS code: 39-28490
- GNIS feature ID: 1087113
- Website: https://www.franklintownshipohio.us/

Franklin Township is one of the eleven townships of Warren County, Ohio, United States. It is located in the northwest corner of the county. The population was 31,676 as of the 2020 census.

== Geography ==
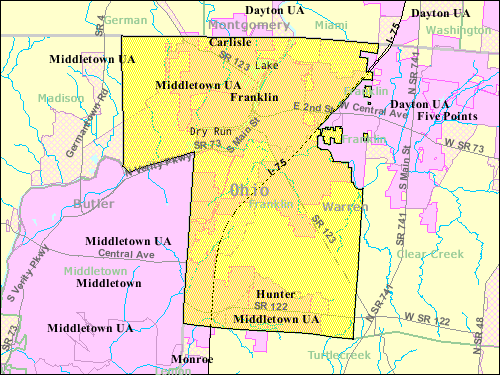

Located in the northwestern corner of the county, it borders the following townships and city:

- German Township, Montgomery County - north
- Clearcreek Township - east
- Turtlecreek Township - south
- Middletown - southwest
- Madison Township, Butler County - west
- Miami Township, Montgomery County - northwest

A large part of the township is in the cities of Franklin and Carlisle, but parts are in the city of Springboro.

Other communities in the township are Hunter, Blue Ball, and Chautauqua.

== Name and history ==
Named from the village of Franklin, it is one of twenty-one Franklin Townships statewide.

One of the original four townships of Warren County, Franklin Township was created on May 10, 1803.

== Government ==
The township is governed by a three-member board of trustees, who are elected in November of odd-numbered years to a four-year term beginning on the following January 1. Two are elected in the year after the presidential election and one is elected in the year before it. There is also an elected township fiscal officer, who serves a four-year term beginning on April 1 of the year after the election, which is held in November of the year before the presidential election. Vacancies in the fiscal officership or on the board of trustees are filled by the remaining trustees.

In November 2004, the people of Franklin Township and the city of Franklin voted on a committee to study merging the two communities. The Board of Elections improperly failed to submit the question to the voters in the township, but the vote in the city was against the merger.

== Public services ==
Most of the township is in the Franklin City School District and Carlisle City School District, but parts are in the Springboro City and Middletown City School Districts. Telephone service is provided through the Franklin, Middletown, Miamisburg, Centerville, and Germantown exchanges, while mail is provided through the Franklin, Carlisle, and Middletown post offices.

Interstate 75 runs through the township, as do State Routes 122, 123 and 73. The Miami and Erie Canal formerly ran through the township.
