= Jackson Township, Montgomery County, Ohio =

Township in Ohio, US

- Township
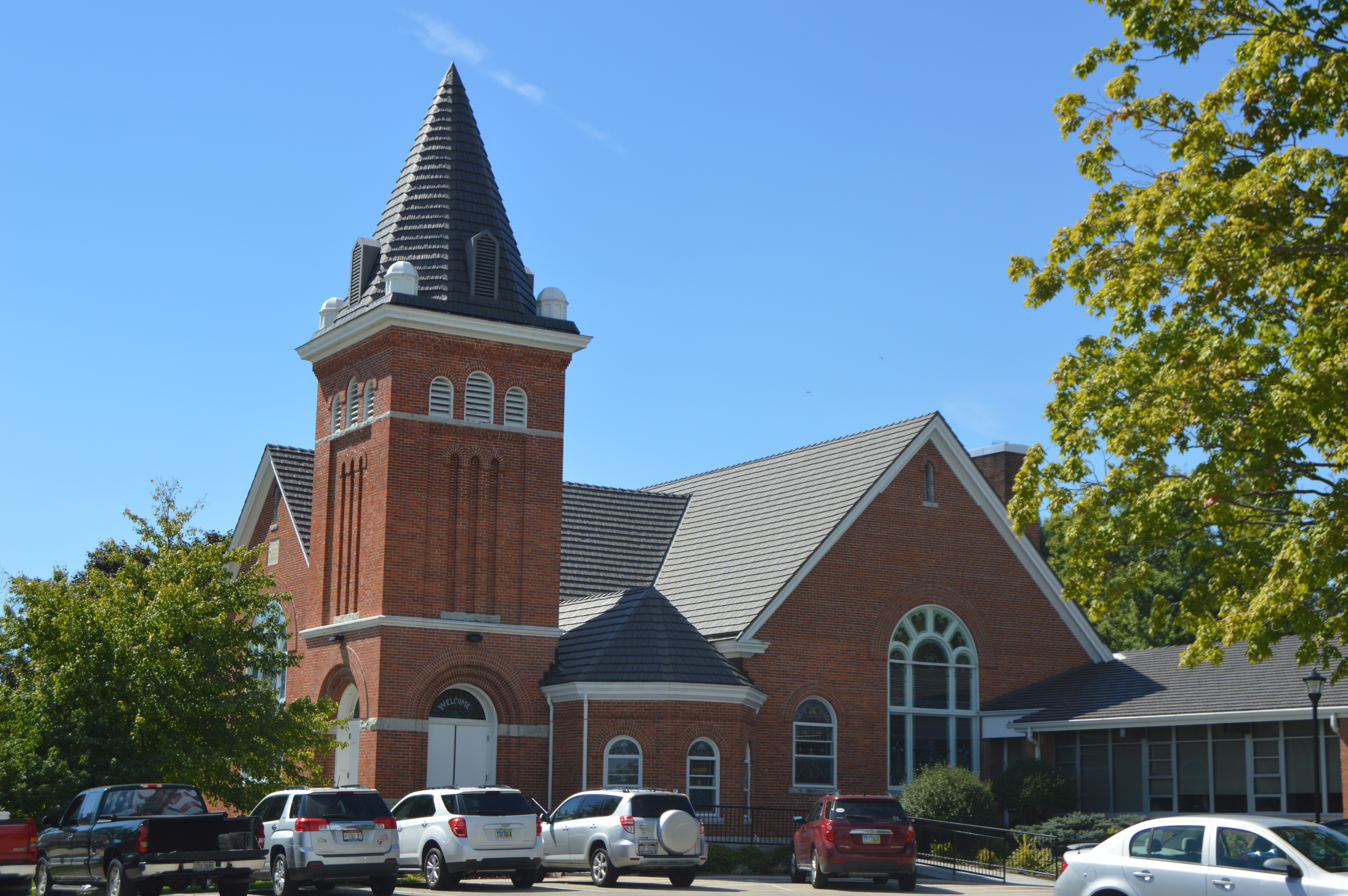
- Slifers Presbyterian Church on Clayton Road

- Location in Montgomery County and the state of Ohio.
- Coordinates: 39°42′24″N 84°24′58″W
- Country: United States
- State: Ohio
- County: Montgomery

Area
  - Total: 37.0 sq mi (95.8 km^{2})
  - Land: 36.8 sq mi (95.4 km^{2})
  - Water: 0.15 sq mi (0.4 km^{2})
- Elevation: 922 ft (281 m)

Population (2020)
  - Total: 6,076
  - Density: 165/sq mi (63.7/km^{2})
- Time zone: UTC-5 (Eastern (EST))
  - Summer (DST): UTC-4 (EDT)
- FIPS code: 39-37912
- GNIS feature ID: 1086670
- Website: https://www.jtwpmc.com/

Jackson Township is one of the nine townships of Montgomery County, Ohio, United States. As of the 2020 census the population was 6,076.

== Geography ==
Located in the western part of the county, it borders the following townships:

- Perry Township - north
- Jefferson Township - east
- German Township - south
- Gratis Township, Preble County - southwest corner
- Lanier Township, Preble County - west
- Twin Township, Preble County - northwest corner

Two villages are located in Jackson Township: Farmersville in the south, and part of New Lebanon in the northeast.

== Name and history ==
It is one of thirty-seven Jackson Townships statewide.

== Government ==
The township is governed by a three-member board of trustees, who are elected in November of odd-numbered years to a four-year term beginning on the following January 1. Two are elected in the year after the presidential election and one is elected in the year before it. There is also an elected township fiscal officer, who serves a four-year term beginning on April 1 of the year after the election, which is held in November of the year before the presidential election. Vacancies in the fiscal officership or on the board of trustees are filled by the remaining trustees.
