= Dewitt Log Homestead =

Historic house in Ohio, United States

- Zachariah Price Dewitt Cabin
- U.S. National Register of Historic Places
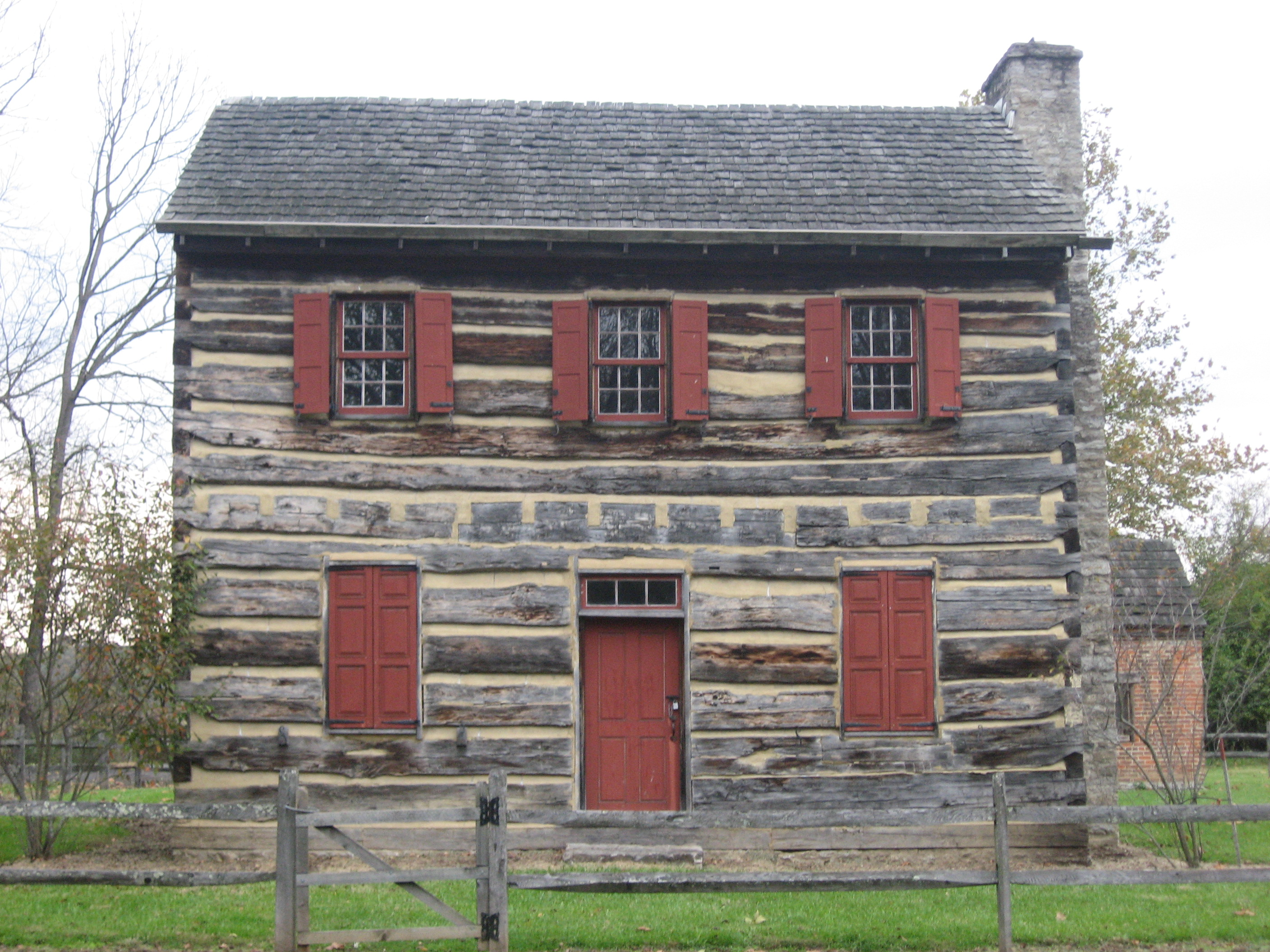
- Front of the cabin

- Location within Ohio Location within the United States
- Interactive map showing the location of Dewitt Cabin
- Nearest city: Oxford, Ohio
- Coordinates: 39°30′38″N 84°43′7″W
- NRHP reference No.: 73001392
- Added to NRHP: 1973-04-13

The Dewitt Log Homestead is a historic building near Oxford, Ohio, listed in the National Register on April 13, 1973.

== Overview ==
This log cabin was built in 1805 by Zachariah Price Dewitt and Elizabeth Dewitt and is the oldest extant structure in the Oxford Township of Butler County, Ohio. It is the only remaining home of the several built by pioneers along the Four-Mile Creek, just east of what is now the Miami University campus. The cabin and surrounding land is now owned by Miami University and is maintained by the Oxford Museum Association as a historic house museum. The cabin is on the north side of Ohio State Route 73 where it crosses Four-Mile Creek.

== Biography of Zechariah DeWitt ==
Zachariah DeWitt was born on April 24, 1768, in New Jersey, and by the 1780s, he had resettled in Kentucky along with two brothers. He married Elizabeth Teets (b. 1774) on March 11, 1790. When Ohio became a state in 1803, residents of Kentucky were drawn to its cheap and newly available land. By 1805 Zachariah and Elizabeth DeWitt had resettled near Four Mile Creek where he built his cabin and opened a sawmill. The cabin is on the east bank of the creek just north of Route 73. Both Zacariah and Elizabeth Dewitt are buried in the Darrtown, Ohio Pioneer Cemetery.

== Recent Years ==
The cabin is located on property belonging to Miami University, and the structure has been leased to the Oxford Museum Association. The association undertook the restoration of the house in 1973. Work included exposing and fixing the original adz-marked timber walls, rebuilding the limestone chimney, and replacing floors. The smokehouse was restored in 1999–2000. The association finished its work in 2003. Later work included interior work. The site was dedicated in May 2003.
