= Brookville Local School District =

School district in Ohio

Coordinates: 39°49′46″N 84°25′03″W

Brookville Local Schools is a public school district in Brookville, Ohio, United States. Brookville Local School District is known for its outstanding schooling. It serves in Perry Township, Ohio, Clay Township Ohio, and Brookville, Ohio. The mascot of Brookville Local Schools is the Blue Devil.

- Brookville High School
- Westbrook Elementary School
- Brookville Intermediate School
