= Dixon Township, Ohio =

Township in Ohio, US

- Township
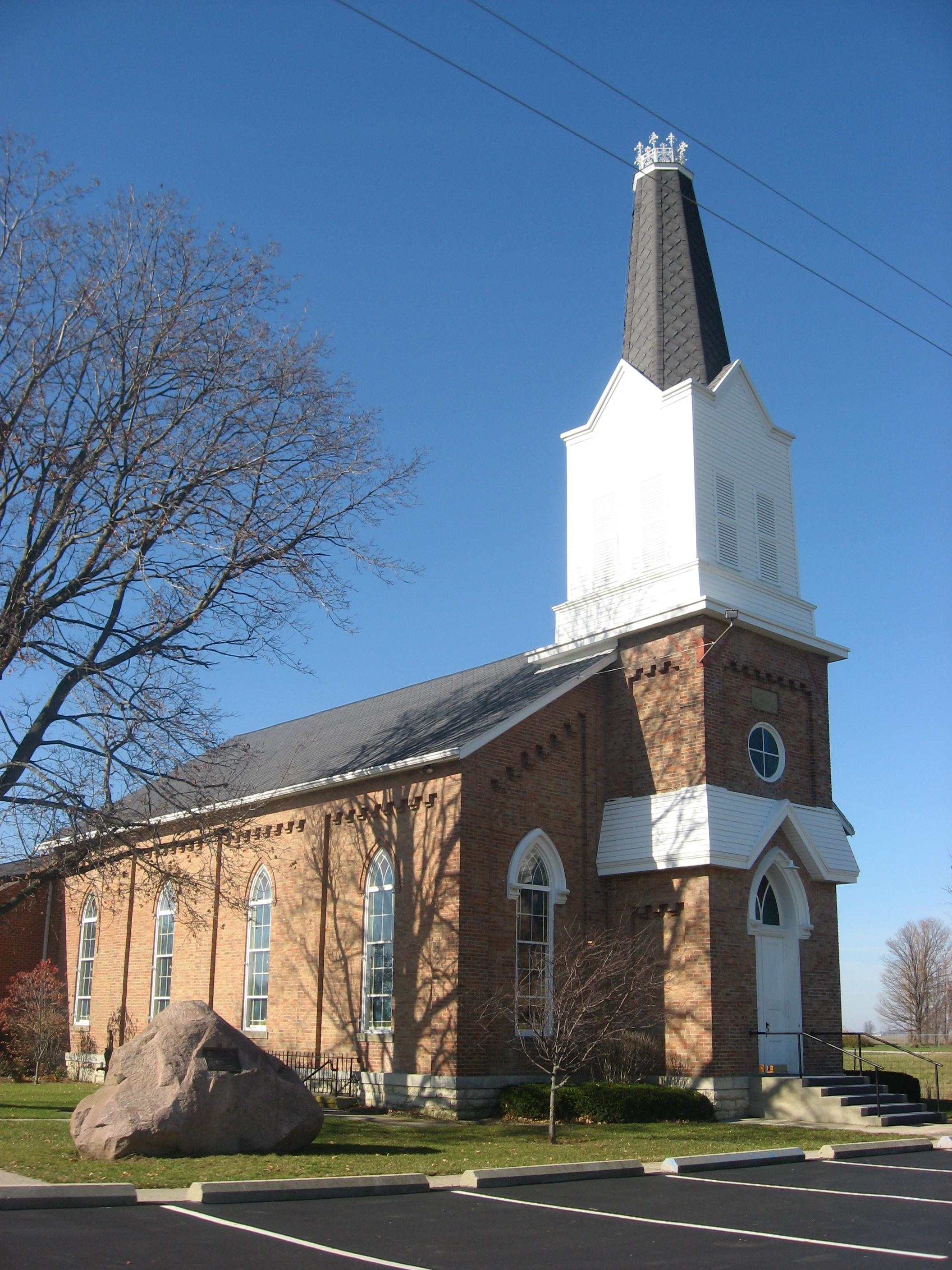
- Concord United Church of Christ

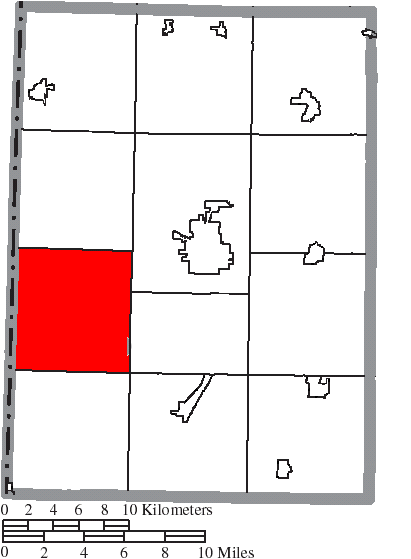
- Location of Dixon Township in Preble County
- Coordinates: 39°41′41″N 84°45′45″W
- Country: United States
- State: Ohio
- County: Preble

Area
  - Total: 35.7 sq mi (92.5 km^{2})
  - Land: 35.7 sq mi (92.5 km^{2})
  - Water: 0 sq mi (0.0 km^{2})
- Elevation: 1,135 ft (346 m)

Population (2020)
  - Total: 568
  - Density: 15.9/sq mi (6.14/km^{2})
- Time zone: UTC-5 (Eastern (EST))
  - Summer (DST): UTC-4 (EDT)
- FIPS code: 39-22106
- GNIS feature ID: 1086844

Dixon Township is one of the twelve townships of Preble County, Ohio, United States. The 2020 census found 568 people in the township.

== Geography ==
Located in the southwestern part of the county, it borders the following townships:

- Jackson Township - north
- Washington Township - northeast
- Gasper Township - east
- Somers Township - southeast corner
- Israel Township - south
- Center Township, Union County, Indiana - southwest
- Harrison Township, Union County, Indiana - west
- Boston Township, Wayne County, Indiana - northwest

No municipalities are located in Dixon Township.

== Name and history ==
Dixon Township was organized in 1812, and named for county commissioner Eli Dixon. It is the only Dixon Township statewide.

== Government ==
The township is governed by a three-member board of trustees, who are elected in November of odd-numbered years to a four-year term beginning on the following January 1. Two are elected in the year after the presidential election and one is elected in the year before it. There is also an elected township fiscal officer, who serves a four-year term beginning on April 1 of the year after the election, which is held in November of the year before the presidential election. Vacancies in the fiscal officership or on the board of trustees are filled by the remaining trustees.
