= Collinsville, Ohio =

Unincorporated community in Ohio, U.S.

Coordinates: 39°30′55″N 84°36′34″W

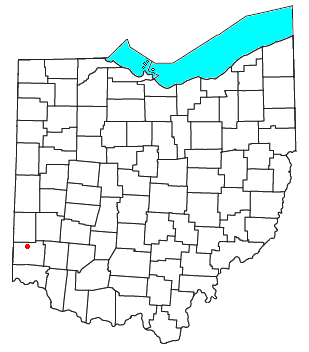
Location of Collinsville, Ohio

Collinsville is an unincorporated community and former village in southeastern Milford Township, Butler County, Ohio, United States. It has a post office with the ZIP code 45004. It lies at the intersection of U.S. Route 127 and State Route 73.

Collinsville was laid out in 1802. The community was named for Charles Collins, a first settler.

Collinsville receives public services through the Milford Township Department of Public Works. Fire protection is provided locally by the Milford Township Fire Department, while emergency medical services are provided by the Seven Mile Life Squad.
