= Lanier Township, Preble County, Ohio =

Township in Ohio, US

- Township
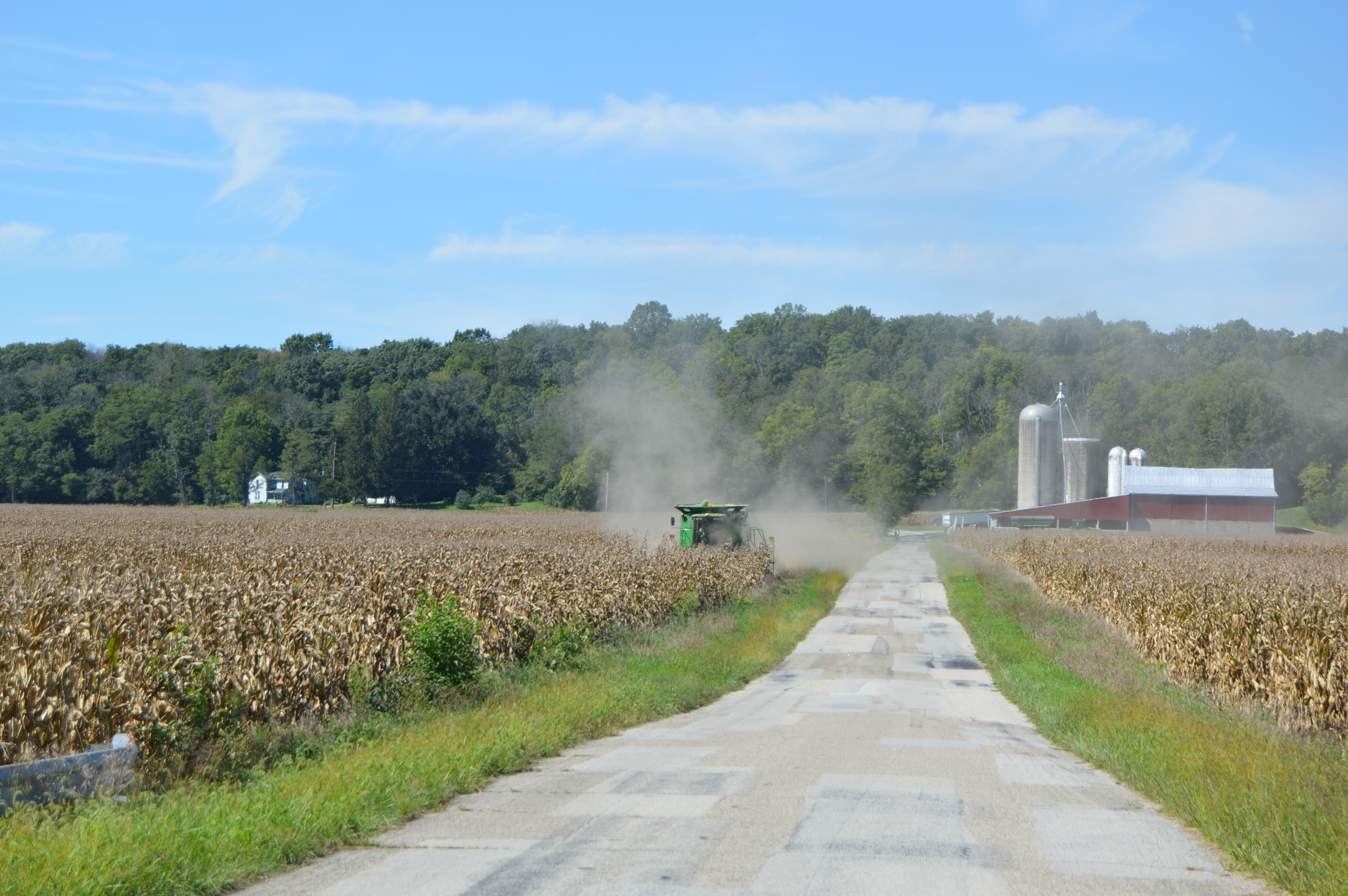
- Corn harvest on Kinsey Road

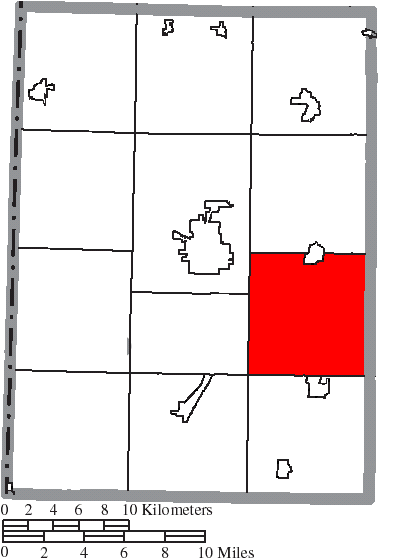
- Location of Lanier Township in Preble County
- Coordinates: 39°42′38″N 84°31′47″W
- Country: United States
- State: Ohio
- County: Preble

Area
  - Total: 36.4 sq mi (94.2 km^{2})
  - Land: 36.3 sq mi (94.1 km^{2})
  - Water: 0 sq mi (0.0 km^{2})
- Elevation: 890 ft (270 m)

Population (2020)
  - Total: 3,727
  - Density: 103/sq mi (39.6/km^{2})
- Time zone: UTC-5 (Eastern (EST))
  - Summer (DST): UTC-4 (EDT)
- FIPS code: 39-41846
- GNIS feature ID: 1086852

Lanier Township is one of the twelve townships of Preble County, Ohio, United States. The 2020 census found 3,727 people in the township.

== Geography ==
Located in the southeastern part of the county, it borders the following townships:

- Twin Township - north
- Perry Township, Montgomery County - northeast corner
- Jackson Township, Montgomery County - east
- German Township, Montgomery County - southeast corner
- Gratis Township - south
- Somers Township - southwest corner
- Gasper Township - west
- Washington Township - northwest

Part of the village of West Alexandria is located in northern Lanier Township.

== Name and history ==
Lanier Township was founded in 1811, and named for Alexander C. Lanier, an early settler in Preble County. It is the only Lanier Township statewide.

== Government ==
The township is governed by a three-member board of trustees, who are elected in November of odd-numbered years to a four-year term beginning on the following January 1. Two are elected in the year after the presidential election and one is elected in the year before it. There is also an elected township fiscal officer, who serves a four-year term beginning on April 1 of the year after the election, which is held in November of the year before the presidential election. Vacancies in the fiscal officership or on the board of trustees are filled by the remaining trustees.
