= Gratis Township, Preble County, Ohio =

Township in Ohio, US

- Township
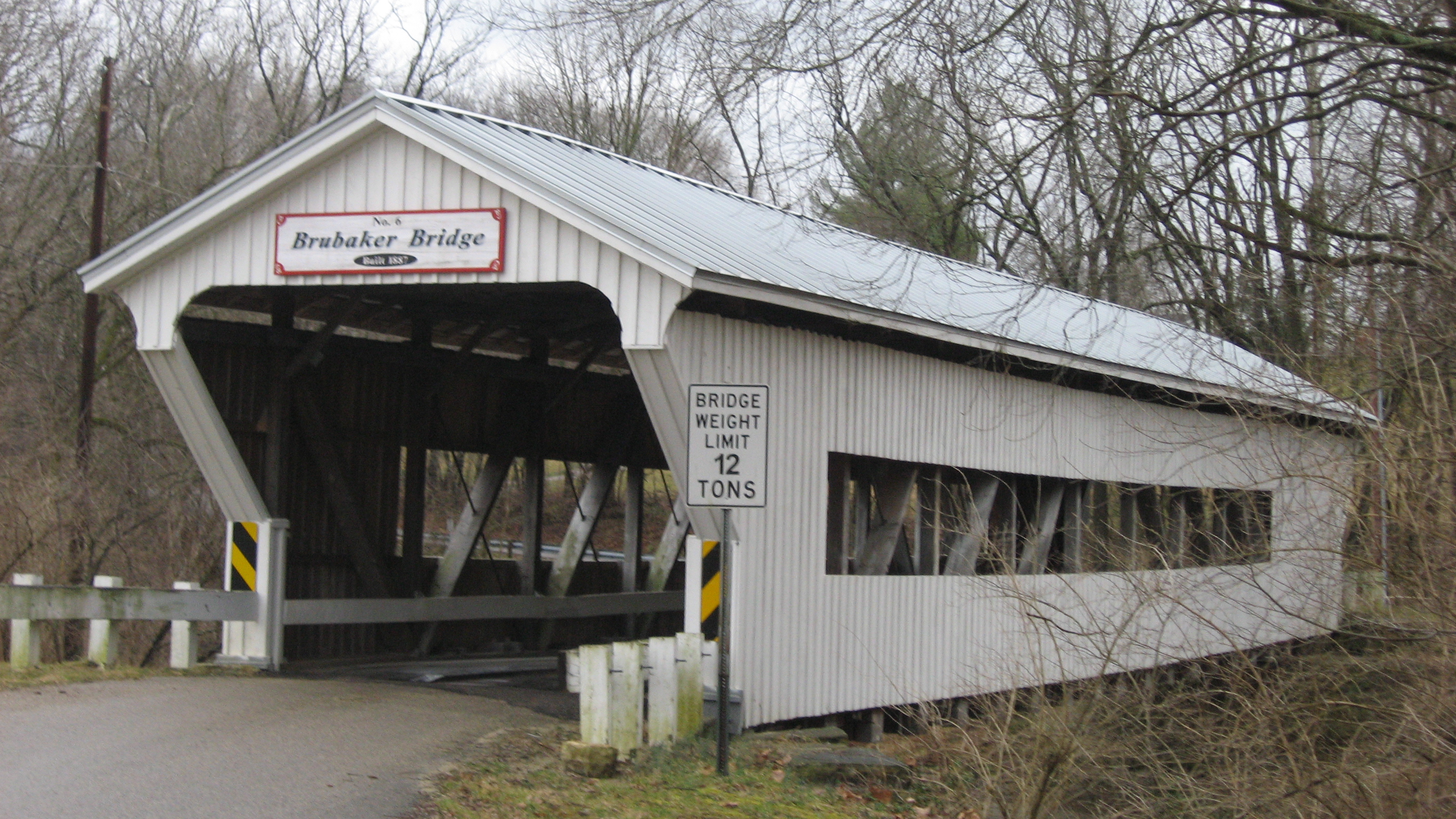
- Brubaker Covered Bridge

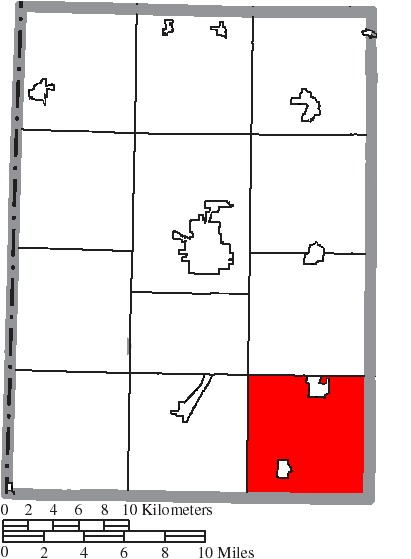
- Location of Gratis Township in Preble County
- Coordinates: 39°36′59″N 84°32′31″W
- Country: United States
- State: Ohio
- County: Preble

Government
  - Trustees: Jeff Lynch, Chad Adkins, & Greg Thompson

Area
  - Total: 36.8 sq mi (95 km^{2})
  - Land: 36.8 sq mi (95 km^{2})
  - Water: 0.0 sq mi (0 km^{2})
- Elevation: 938 ft (286 m)

Population (2020)
  - Total: 4,224
  - Density: 115/sq mi (44.3/km^{2})
- Time zone: UTC-5 (Eastern (EST))
  - Summer (DST): UTC-4 (EDT)
- ZIP code: 45330
- Area codes: 937, 326
- FIPS code: 39-31486
- GNIS feature ID: 1086847

Gratis Township is one of the twelve townships of Preble County, Ohio, United States. The 2020 census found 4,224 people in the township.

== Geography ==
Located in the southeastern corner of the county, it borders the following townships:

- Lanier Township - north
- Jackson Township, Montgomery County - northeast corner
- German Township, Montgomery County - east
- Madison Township, Butler County - southeast
- Wayne Township, Butler County - south
- Milford Township, Butler County - southwest corner
- Somers Township - west
- Gasper Township - northwest corner

Two incorporated villages are located in Gratis Township: Gratis in the north, and West Elkton in the south.

== Name and history ==
According to tradition, Gratis Township's name is derived from the original request, namely "we think we ought to have the township gratis". It is the only Gratis Township statewide.

== Government ==
The township is governed by a three-member board of trustees, who are elected in November of odd-numbered years to a four-year term beginning on the following January 1. Two are elected in the year after the presidential election and one is elected in the year before it. There is also an elected township fiscal officer, who serves a four-year term beginning on April 1 of the year after the election, which is held in November of the year before the presidential election. Vacancies in the fiscal officership or on the board of trustees are filled by the remaining trustees.
