= Harrison Township, Preble County, Ohio =

Township in Ohio, US

- Township
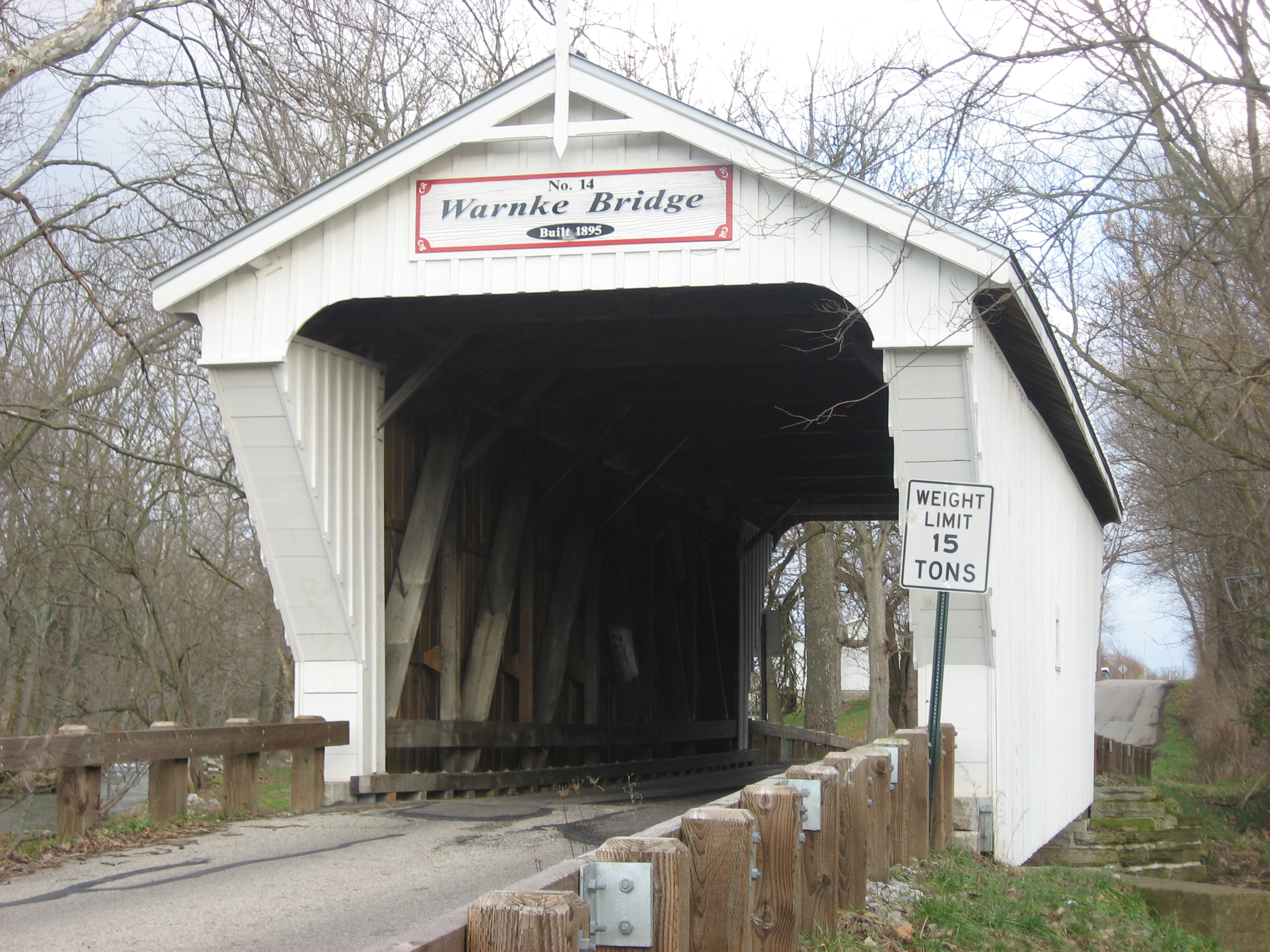
- Warnke Covered Bridge

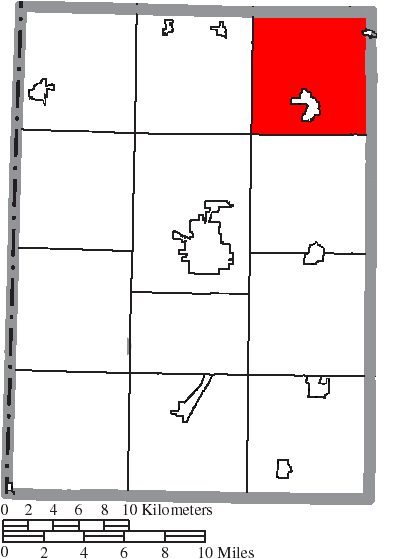
- Location of Harrison Township in Preble County
- Coordinates: 39°51′39″N 84°32′6″W
- Country: United States
- State: Ohio
- County: Preble

Area
  - Total: 35.9 sq mi (93.0 km^{2})
  - Land: 35.9 sq mi (93.0 km^{2})
  - Water: 0 sq mi (0.0 km^{2})
- Elevation: 1,024 ft (312 m)

Population (2020)
  - Total: 4,305
  - Density: 120/sq mi (46.3/km^{2})
- Time zone: UTC-5 (Eastern (EST))
  - Summer (DST): UTC-4 (EDT)
- FIPS code: 39-33992
- GNIS feature ID: 1086848
- Website: www.harrisontwppc.org

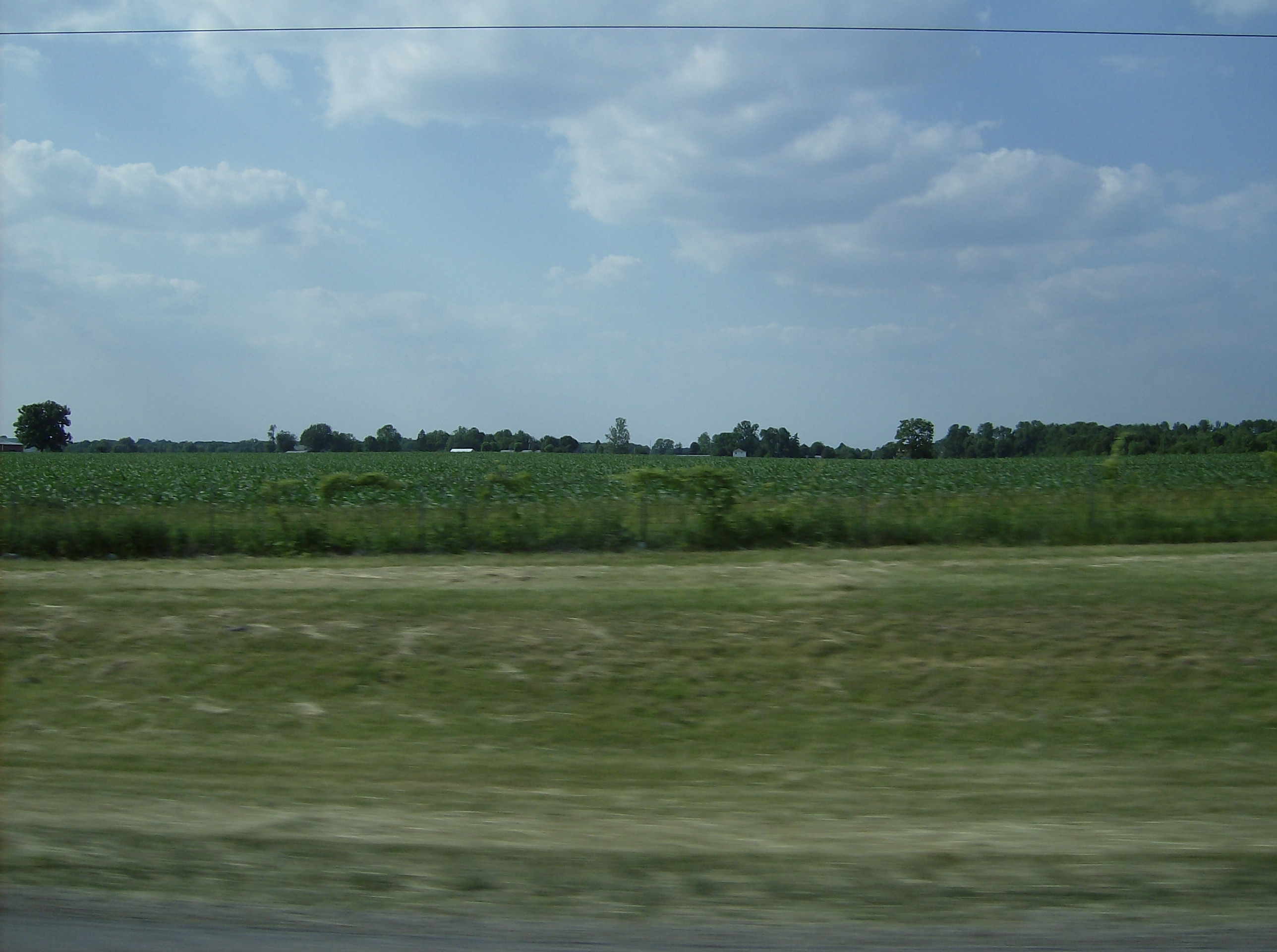
Countryside in Harrison Township

Harrison Township is one of the twelve townships of Preble County, Ohio, United States. The 2020 census found 4,305 people in the township.

== Geography ==
Located in the northeastern corner of the county, it borders the following townships:

- Twin Township, Darke County - north
- Monroe Township, Darke County - northeast
- Clay Township, Montgomery County - east
- Perry Township, Montgomery County - southeast corner
- Twin Township - south
- Washington Township - southwest corner
- Monroe Township - west
- Butler Township, Darke County - northwest corner

Two incorporated villages are located in Harrison Township: Lewisburg, in the south, and part of Verona, in the northeast.

== Name and history ==
Harrison Township was named for William Henry Harrison, a U.S. Army officer and afterward 9th President of the United States. It is one of nineteen Harrison Townships statewide.

== Government ==
The township is governed by a three-member board of trustees, who are elected in November of odd-numbered years to a four-year term beginning on the following January 1. Two are elected in the year after the presidential election and one is elected in the year before it. There is also an elected township fiscal officer, who serves a four-year term beginning on April 1 of the year after the election, which is held in November of the year before the presidential election. Vacancies in the fiscal officership or on the board of trustees are filled by the remaining trustees.
