= Jefferson Township, Montgomery County, Ohio =

Township in Ohio, US

- Township
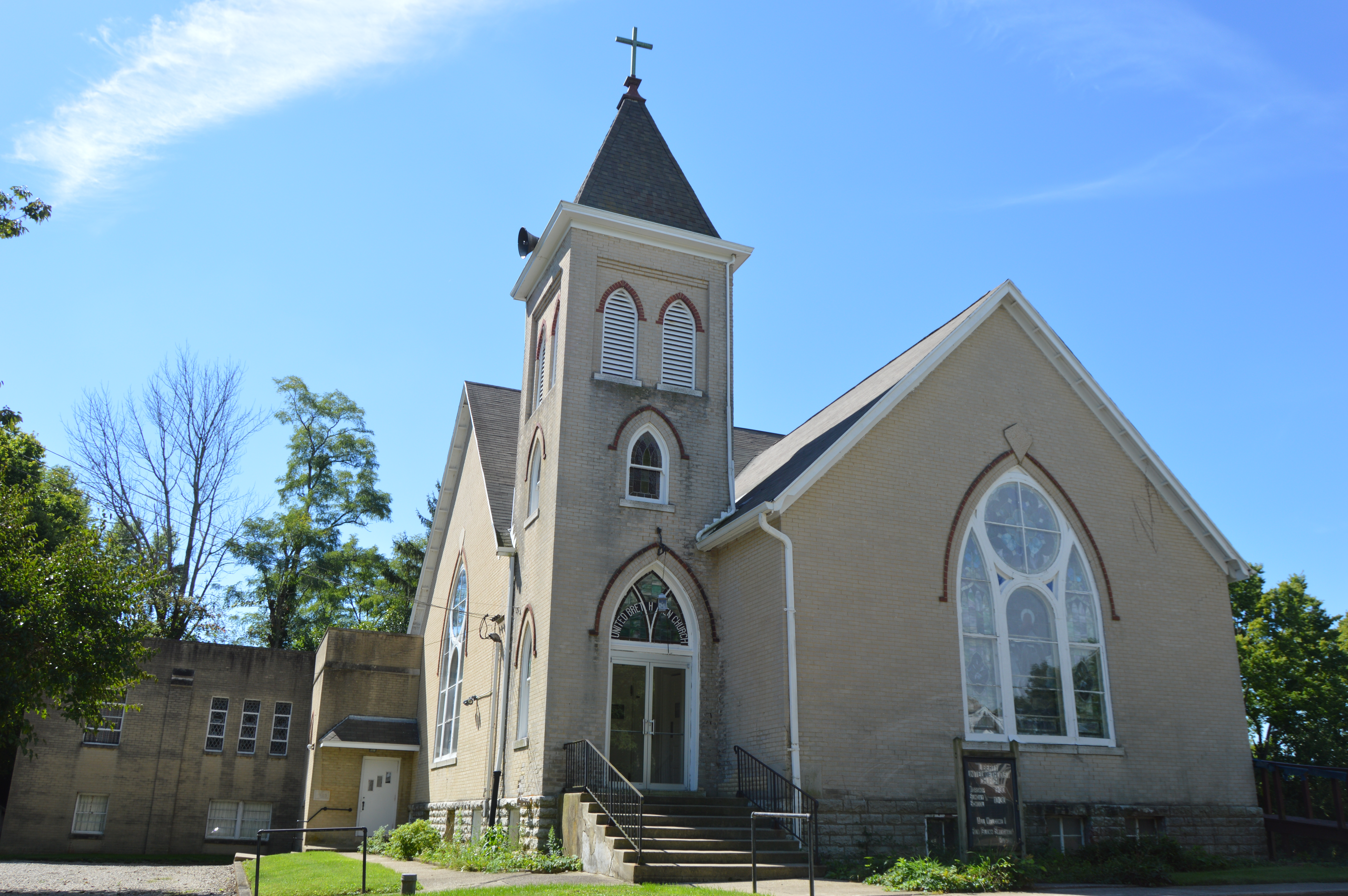
- Methodist church at Liberty

- Location in Montgomery County and the state of Ohio.
- Coordinates: 39°43′25″N 84°17′59″W
- Country: United States
- State: Ohio
- County: Montgomery

Area
  - Total: 25.5 sq mi (66.0 km^{2})
  - Land: 25.5 sq mi (66.0 km^{2})
  - Water: 0 sq mi (0.0 km^{2})
- Elevation: 922 ft (281 m)

Population (2020)
  - Total: 5,855
  - Density: 230/sq mi (88.7/km^{2})
- Time zone: UTC-5 (Eastern (EST))
  - Summer (DST): UTC-4 (EDT)
- FIPS code: 39-38738
- GNIS feature ID: 1086671
- Website: https://www.jeffersontwp.net/

Jefferson Township is one of the nine townships of Montgomery County, Ohio, United States. As of the 2020 census the population was 5,855.

== Geography ==
Located in the central part of the county, it borders the following townships and cities:

- Trotwood - north
- Dayton, the seat of the county - northeast
- Moraine - east
- Miami Township - southeast
- German Township - southwest
- Jackson Township - west
- Perry Township - northwest corner

Parts of several cities are located in Jefferson Township:

- Moraine, in the east
- West Carrollton, in the southeast

The census-designated place of Drexel is located in the township's northeast, and the unincorporated community of New Chicago is in the township's east.

== Name and history ==
It is one of twenty-four Jefferson townships statewide.

Jefferson Township was created from German Township on 10 June 1805.

In 1833, Jefferson Township contained three gristmills, three saw mills, and eight distilleries.

== Government ==
The township is governed by a three-member board of trustees, who are elected in November of odd-numbered years to a four-year term beginning on the following January 1. Two are elected in the year after the presidential election and one is elected in the year before it. There is also an elected township fiscal officer, who serves a four-year term beginning on April 1 of the year after the election, which is held in November of the year before the presidential election. Vacancies in the fiscal officership or on the board of trustees are filled by the remaining trustees.

Police services are provided in the township through a contract with the Montgomery County Sheriff’s Office.
