= Somers Township, Preble County, Ohio =

Township in Ohio, US

- Township
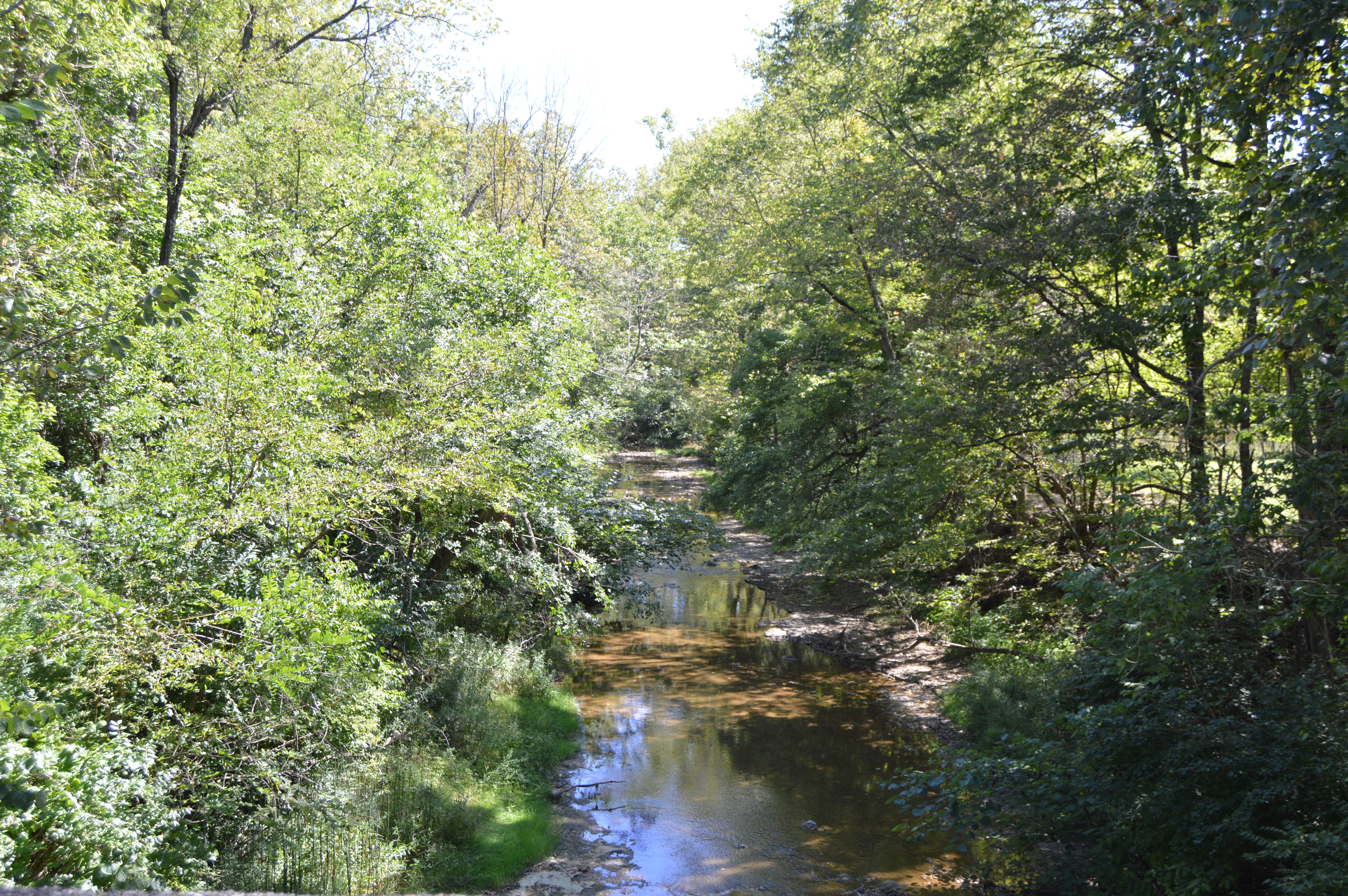
- Paint Creek northwest of Camden

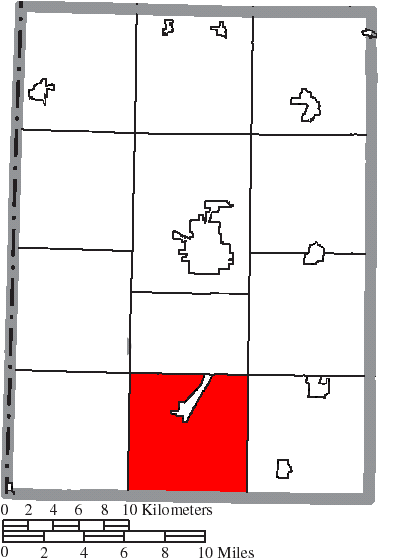
- Location of Somers Township in Preble County
- Coordinates: 39°37′7″N 84°38′59″W
- Country: United States
- State: Ohio
- County: Preble

Area
  - Total: 35.8 sq mi (92.7 km^{2})
  - Land: 35.8 sq mi (92.7 km^{2})
  - Water: 0 sq mi (0.0 km^{2})
- Elevation: 912 ft (278 m)

Population (2020)
  - Total: 3,829
  - Density: 107/sq mi (41.3/km^{2})
- Time zone: UTC-5 (Eastern (EST))
  - Summer (DST): UTC-4 (EDT)
- FIPS code: 39-72964
- GNIS feature ID: 1086854

Somers Township is one of the twelve townships of Preble County, Ohio, United States. The 2020 census found 3,829 people in the township.

== Geography ==
Located in the southern part of the county, it borders the following townships:

- Gasper Township - north
- Lanier Township - northeast corner
- Gratis Township - east
- Wayne Township, Butler County - southeast corner
- Milford Township, Butler County - south
- Oxford Township, Butler County - southwest corner
- Israel Township - west
- Dixon Township - northwest corner

The village of Camden is located in northern Somers Township.

== Name and history ==
Named for Commodore Richard Somers, it is the only Somers Township statewide.

== Government ==
The township is governed by a three-member board of trustees, who are elected in November of odd-numbered years to a four-year term beginning on the following January 1. Two are elected in the year after the presidential election and one is elected in the year before it. There is also an elected township fiscal officer, who serves a four-year term beginning on April 1 of the year after the election, which is held in November of the year before the presidential election. Vacancies in the fiscal officership or on the board of trustees are filled by the remaining trustees.
