= Lake Lakengren, Ohio =

Census-designated place in Preble County, Ohio, United States

- Census-designated place
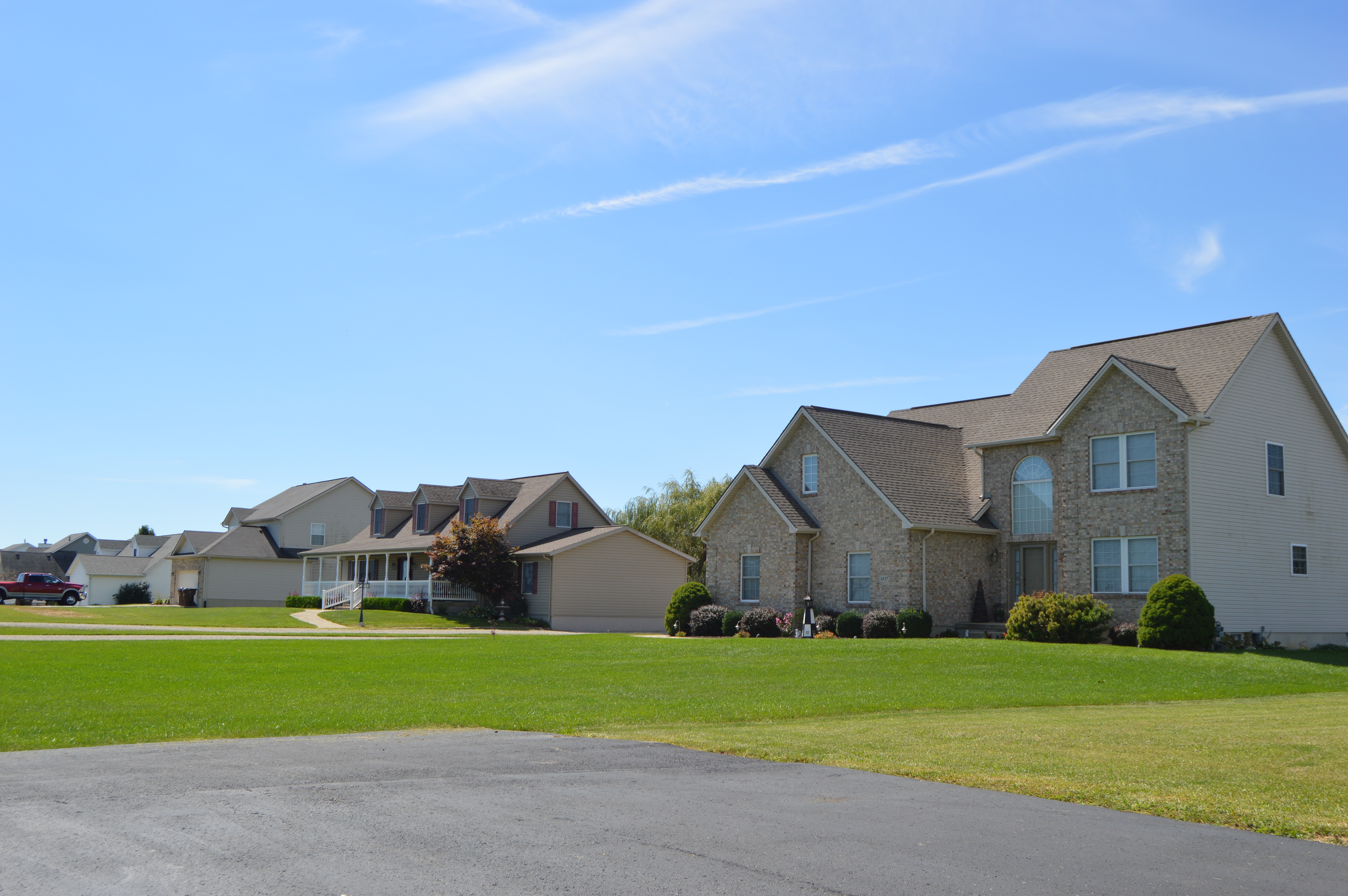
- Houses on Paint Creek Road

- Location within Ohio
- Country: United States
- State: Ohio
- County: Preble
- Township: Gasper
- Elevation: 1,089 ft (332 m)

Population (2020)
  - Total: 3,387
- Time zone: UTC-5 (Eastern (EST))
  - Summer (DST): UTC-4 (EDT)
- ZIP code: 45320
- Area codes: 937, 326
- FIPS code: 39135
- GNIS Feature ID: 2633187
- Website: www.lakengrenpoa.org

Lake Lakengren (lock-n-grin, a Viking name meaning “Lake of the emerald green hills”) is an unincorporated community and census-designated place in Gasper Township, Preble County, Ohio, United States. The population was 3,387 at the 2020 census. A private planned community located 3 miles (4.8 km) southwest of Eaton, the northern portion of Lake Lakengren is served by Eaton Community Schools and the southern portion is served by the Preble Shawnee Local School District.

== History ==
Lake Lakengren had its start in the late 1960s as a planned community.

== Demographics ==
=== 2020 census ===
As of the 2020 census, Lake Lakengren had a population of 3,387. The median age was 42.1 years. 24.2% of residents were under the age of 18 and 17.0% of residents were 65 years of age or older. For every 100 females there were 95.6 males, and for every 100 females age 18 and over there were 92.6 males age 18 and over.

0.0% of residents lived in urban areas, while 100.0% lived in rural areas.

There were 1,291 households in Lake Lakengren, of which 32.1% had children under the age of 18 living in them. Of all households, 61.0% were married-couple households, 14.3% were households with a male householder and no spouse or partner present, and 16.3% were households with a female householder and no spouse or partner present. About 19.4% of all households were made up of individuals and 8.8% had someone living alone who was 65 years of age or older.

There were 1,401 housing units, of which 7.9% were vacant. The homeowner vacancy rate was 1.3% and the rental vacancy rate was 0.0%.

Racial composition as of the 2020 census
Race	Number	Percent
White	3,188	94.1%
Black or African American	18	0.5%
American Indian and Alaska Native	5	0.1%
Asian	9	0.3%
Native Hawaiian and Other Pacific Islander	0	0.0%
Some other race	4	0.1%
Two or more races	163	4.8%
Hispanic or Latino (of any race)	38	1.1%
