= College Township =

Original land survey of Oxford, Ohio

The "College Township" was the full survey township located in the northwest corner of Butler County, Ohio, now corresponding to the civil township of Oxford, designated by the Ohio General Assembly to be the site of the state university now called Miami University. When Congress, on May 5, 1792, authorized the sale to John Cleves Symmes of the land known as the Symmes Purchase, one of the terms was that he would allocate a full township of land to support a university, a promise he never fulfilled. The United States Congress subsequently allowed the State of Ohio to pick a township in the public domain for a college. They chose a township in the first range in the Congress Lands, namely R1E T5.

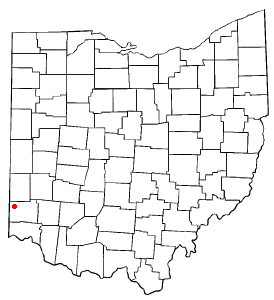
Oxford Township, Butler County, Ohio, aka the College Township

The village of College Corner takes its name from its position in the northwest corner of this section and the Indiana town of College Corner took its name from its Ohio counterpart.

When Butler County was originally divided into townships in 1803, this land was included in St. Clair Township, then later Milford Township before Oxford Township was erected in 1811.

Ohio's first appropriation for roads, passed at the second General Assembly, (February 18, 1804), included $1585 for the road from Chillicothe (then the state capital) to the college township via Lebanon. In Butler County, this corresponds to the present-day State Route 73.
