= German Township, Montgomery County, Ohio =

Township in Ohio, US

- Township
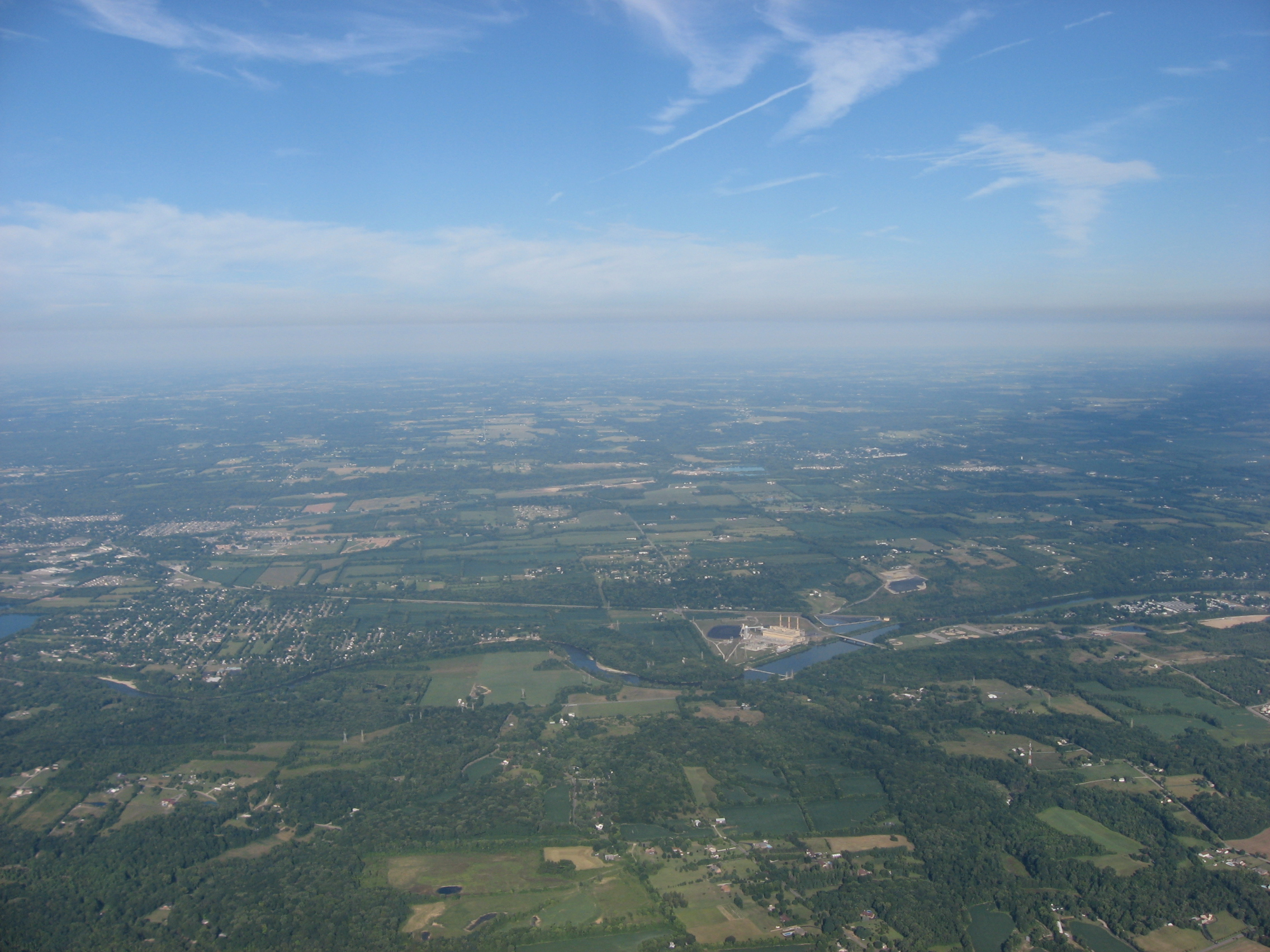
- Countryside in German Township

- Location in Montgomery County and the state of Ohio.
- Coordinates: 39°37′22″N 84°22′43″W
- Country: United States
- State: Ohio
- County: Montgomery

Area
  - Total: 38.0 sq mi (98.3 km^{2})
  - Land: 38.0 sq mi (98.3 km^{2})
  - Water: 0 sq mi (0.0 km^{2})
- Elevation: 748 ft (228 m)

Population (2020)
  - Total: 8,747
  - Density: 230/sq mi (89.0/km^{2})
- Time zone: UTC-5 (Eastern (EST))
  - Summer (DST): UTC-4 (EDT)
- FIPS code: 39-29904
- GNIS feature ID: 1086667
- Website: https://german-township.org/

German Township is one of the nine townships of Montgomery County, Ohio, United States. As of the 2020 census the population was 8,747.

== Geography ==
Located in the southwestern corner of the county, it borders the following townships:

- Jackson Township - north
- Jefferson Township - northeast
- Miami Township - east
- Franklin Township, Warren County - southeast
- Madison Township, Butler County - south
- Gratis Township, Preble County - west
- Lanier Township, Preble County - northwest corner

It is the only township in the county with a border on Butler County.

Two municipalities are located in German Township: the village of Germantown is located in the northeast, and a small part of the city of Carlisle, in the southeast.

== Name and history ==
It is one of five German Townships statewide.

German Township was described in 1833 as having seven gristmills, nine saw mills, two fulling mills, five tanneries, and sixteen distilleries.

== Government ==
The township is governed by a three-member board of trustees, who are elected in November of odd-numbered years to a four-year term beginning on the following January 1. Two are elected in the year after the presidential election and one is elected in the year before it. There is also an elected township fiscal officer, who serves a four-year term beginning on April 1 of the year after the election, which is held in November of the year before the presidential election. Vacancies in the fiscal officership or on the board of trustees are filled by the remaining trustees.
