= Milford Township, Butler County, Ohio =

Township in Ohio, US

- Township
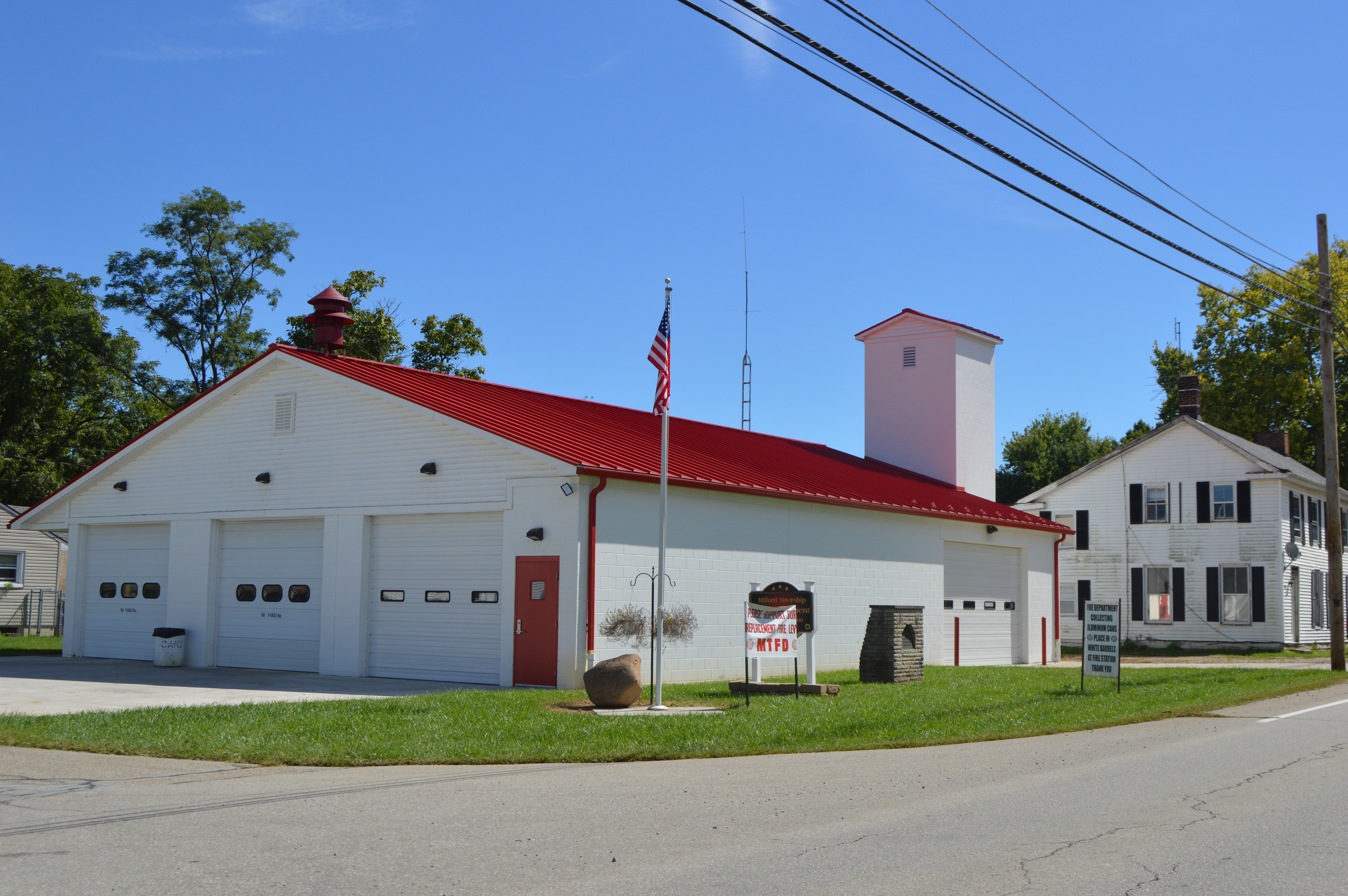
- Township fire department in Darrtown

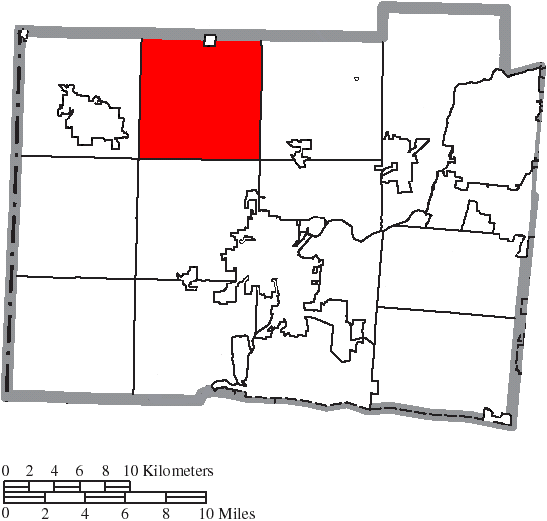
- Location of Milford Township in Butler County
- Coordinates: 39°31′38″N 84°38′49″W
- Country: United States
- State: Ohio
- County: Butler

Area
  - Total: 36.9 sq mi (95.5 km^{2})
  - Land: 36.8 sq mi (95.2 km^{2})
  - Water: 0.12 sq mi (0.3 km^{2})
- Elevation: 876 ft (267 m)

Population (2020)
  - Total: 3,523
  - Density: 97/sq mi (37.3/km^{2})
- Time zone: UTC-5 (Eastern (EST))
  - Summer (DST): UTC-4 (EDT)
- FIPS code: 39-50162
- GNIS feature ID: 1085815
- Website: www.milfordtownshipohio.org

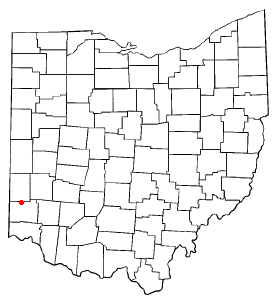
Milford Township

Milford Township is one of thirteen townships in Butler County, Ohio, United States. It is located between Oxford and Middletown. The township had a population of 3,523 at the 2020 census.

== History ==
The seventh township in order of creation, it was erected from St. Clair Township by the Butler County Commissioners on December 2, 1805.

This area was diminished to the present territory when the western half, another full survey township commonly known as the "college township", was separated from Milford Township by the Butler County Commissioners (James Blackburn, William Robison, and John Wingate) on August 5, 1811, to form Oxford Township.

== Geography ==
Located in the northern part of the county, it borders the following townships:

- Somers Township, Preble County - north
- Gratis Township, Preble County - northeast corner
- Wayne Township - east
- St. Clair Township - southeast corner
- Hanover Township - south
- Reily Township - southwest corner
- Oxford Township - west
- Israel Township, Preble County - northwest corner

Unincorporated places in the township are Darrtown, Collinsville, and Somerville.

== Government ==
The township is governed by a three-member board of trustees, who are elected in November of odd-numbered years to a four-year term beginning on the following January 1. Two are elected in the year after the presidential election and one is elected in the year before it. There is also an elected township fiscal officer, who serves a four-year term beginning on April 1 of the year after the election, which is held in November of the year before the presidential election. Vacancies in the fiscal officership or on the board of trustees are filled by the remaining trustees.

== Public services ==
The township is served by the Somerville and Collinsville post offices and is in the Talawanda City School District. Major highways include State Routes 73 (the road between Oxford and Middletown), 177, and 744, and U.S. Route 127 (the road between Hamilton and Eaton). U.S. 127 was dedicated at the 2005 Milford Township Bicentennial as the Gov. Andrew L. Harris Bicentennial Roadway by an invited speaker, James Brodbelt Harris, the governor's relative and the president of the family reunion association, whose family owns an Ohio Century Farm in the township.
