= Washington Township, Preble County, Ohio =

Township in Ohio, US

- Township
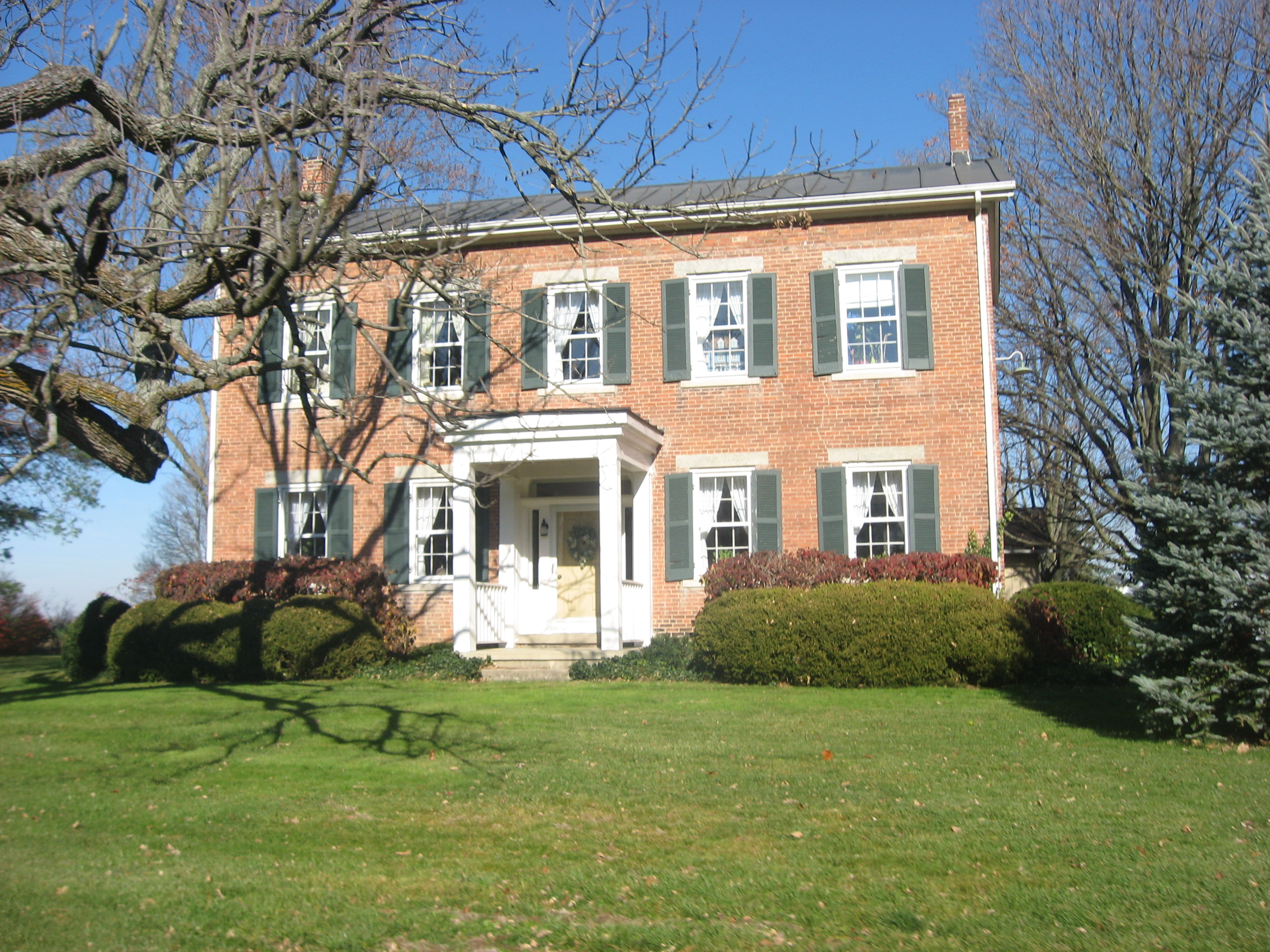
- The Daniel Christman Farmhouse, a historic site in the township

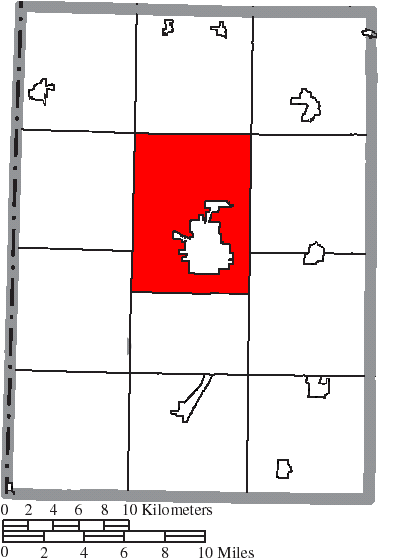
- Location of Washington Township in Preble County
- Coordinates: 39°46′48″N 84°38′53″W
- Country: United States
- State: Ohio
- County: Preble

Area
  - Total: 40.0 sq mi (103.7 km^{2})
  - Land: 40.0 sq mi (103.7 km^{2})
  - Water: 0 sq mi (0.0 km^{2})
- Elevation: 1,076 ft (328 m)

Population (2020)
  - Total: 1,809
  - Density: 45.18/sq mi (17.44/km^{2})
- Time zone: UTC-5 (Eastern (EST))
  - Summer (DST): UTC-4 (EDT)
- FIPS code: 39-81564
- GNIS feature ID: 1086856

Washington Township is one of the twelve townships of Preble County, Ohio, United States. The 2020 census found 1,809 people in the township.

== Geography ==
Located in the north central part of the county, it borders the following townships:

- Monroe Township - north
- Harrison Township - northeast corner
- Twin Township - east
- Lanier Township - southeast
- Gasper Township - south
- Dixon Township - southwest
- Jackson Township - west
- Jefferson Township - northwest corner

The city of Eaton, the county seat of Preble County, is located in central Washington Township.

== Name and history ==
Washington Township was organized in 1809, and named for President George Washington. It is one of forty-three Washington Townships statewide.

== Government ==
The township is governed by a three-member board of trustees, who are elected in November of odd-numbered years to a four-year term beginning on the following January 1. Two are elected in the year after the presidential election and one is elected in the year before it. There is also an elected township fiscal officer, who serves a four-year term beginning on April 1 of the year after the election, which is held in November of the year before the presidential election. Vacancies in the fiscal officership or on the board of trustees are filled by the remaining trustees.
