= Twin Township, Preble County, Ohio =

Township in Ohio, US

- Township
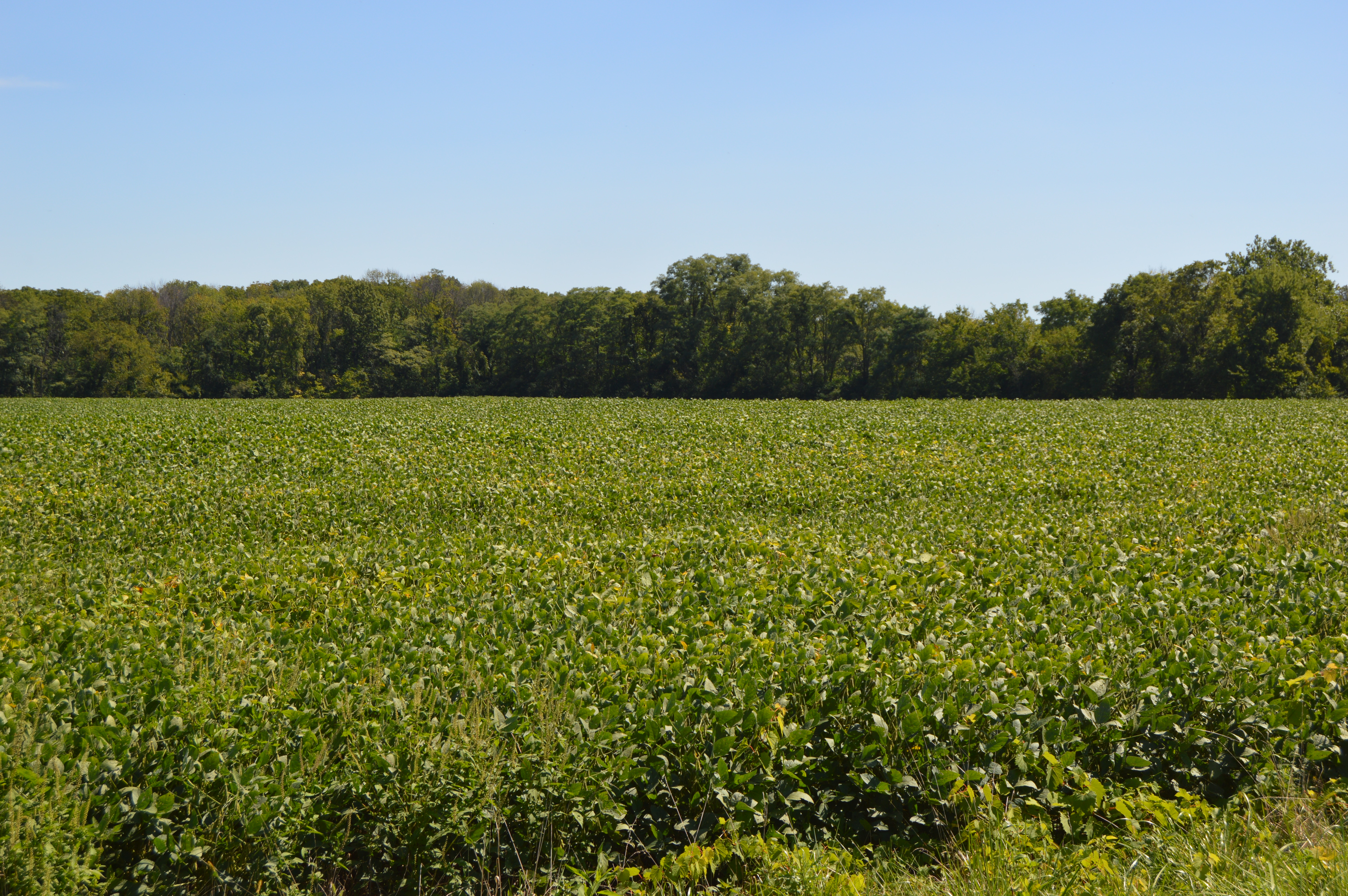
- Fields on Quinn Road

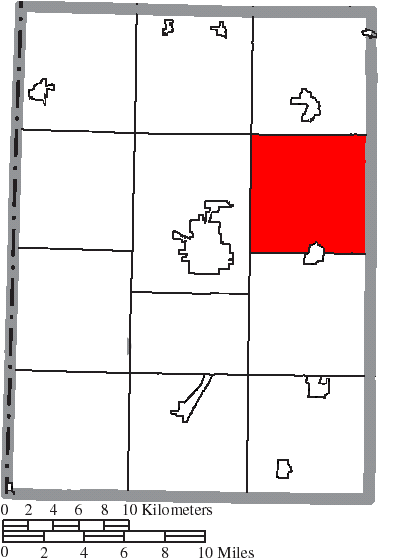
- Location of Twin Township in Preble County
- Coordinates: 39°46′36″N 84°31′41″W
- Country: United States
- State: Ohio
- County: Preble

Area
  - Total: 35.1 sq mi (90.8 km^{2})
  - Land: 35.0 sq mi (90.7 km^{2})
  - Water: 0.039 sq mi (0.1 km^{2})
- Elevation: 1,001 ft (305 m)

Population (2020)
  - Total: 2,669
  - Density: 76/sq mi (29.4/km^{2})
- Time zone: UTC-5 (Eastern (EST))
  - Summer (DST): UTC-4 (EDT)
- FIPS code: 39-77994
- GNIS feature ID: 1086855

Twin Township is one of the twelve townships of Preble County, Ohio, United States. The 2020 census found 2,669 people in the township.

== Geography ==
Located in the northeastern part of the county, it borders the following townships:

- Harrison Township - north
- Clay Township, Montgomery County - northeast corner
- Perry Township, Montgomery County - east
- Jackson Township, Montgomery County - southeast corner
- Lanier Township - south
- Washington Township - west
- Monroe Township - northwest corner

Part of the village of West Alexandria is located in southern Twin Township.

== Name and history ==
Twin Township was organized in 1808, and named after Twin Creek which runs through it. Statewide, other Twin Townships are located in Darke and Ross counties.

== Government ==
The township is governed by a three-member board of trustees, who are elected in November of odd-numbered years to a four-year term beginning on the following January 1. Two are elected in the year after the presidential election and one is elected in the year before it. There is also an elected township fiscal officer, who serves a four-year term beginning on April 1 of the year after the election, which is held in November of the year before the presidential election. Vacancies in the fiscal officership or on the board of trustees are filled by the remaining trustees.
