= Gasper Township, Preble County, Ohio =

Township in Ohio, US

- Township
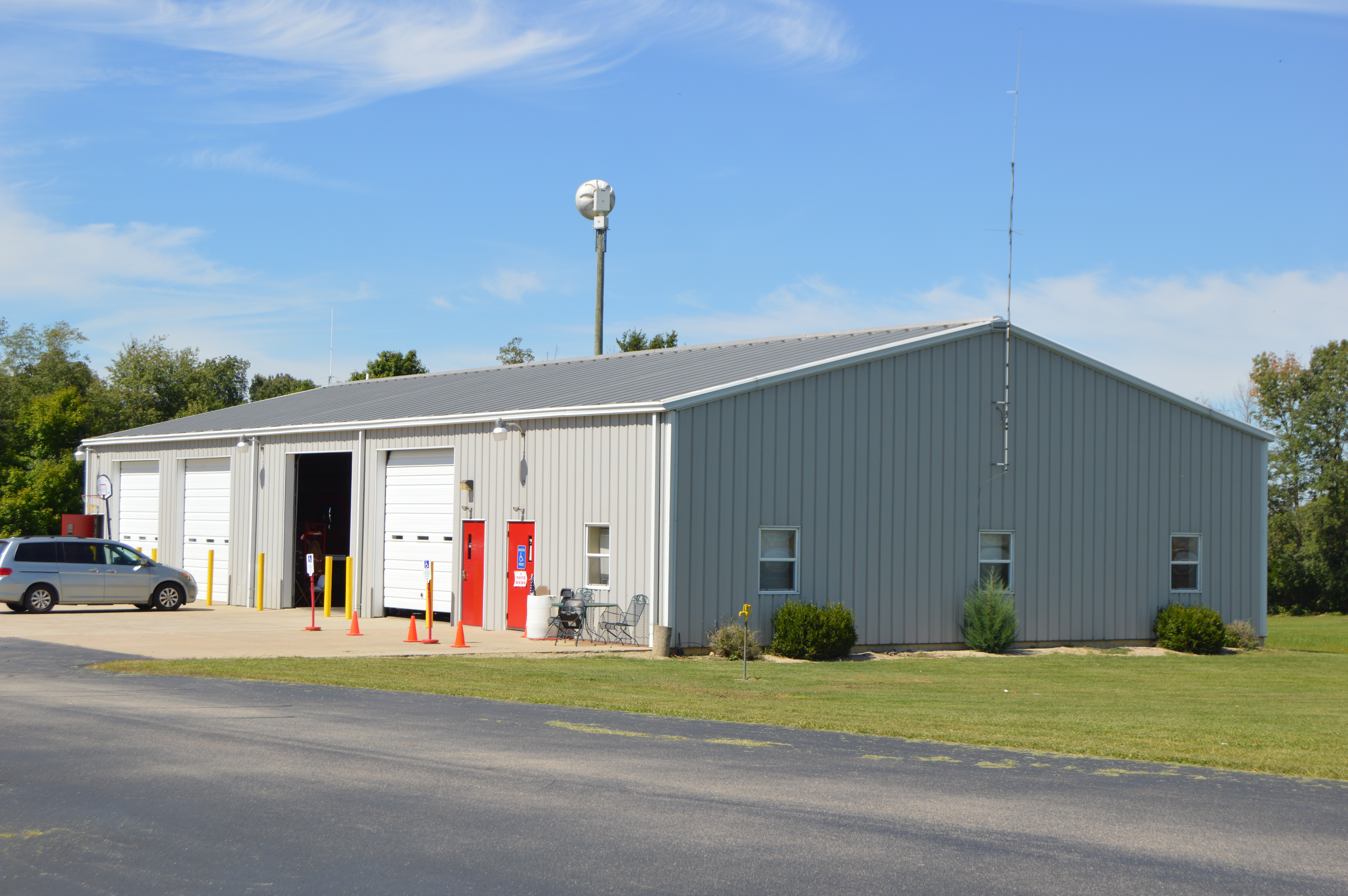
- Fire station on Paint Creek Road

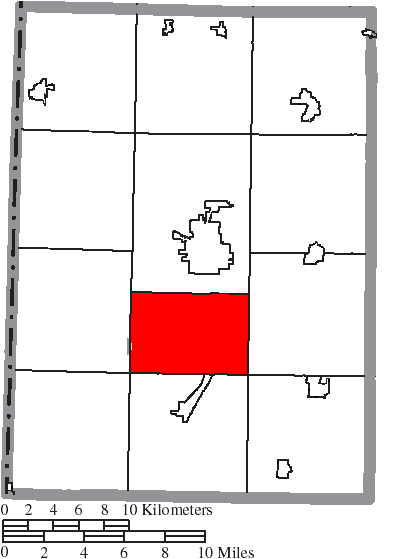
- Location of Gasper Township in Preble County
- Coordinates: 39°41′10″N 84°40′6″W
- Country: United States
- State: Ohio
- County: Preble

Area
  - Total: 23.4 sq mi (60.6 km^{2})
  - Land: 22.9 sq mi (59.3 km^{2})
  - Water: 0.54 sq mi (1.4 km^{2})
- Elevation: 1,079 ft (329 m)

Population (2020)
  - Total: 3,911
  - Density: 170/sq mi (66/km^{2})
- Time zone: UTC-5 (Eastern (EST))
  - Summer (DST): UTC-4 (EDT)
- FIPS code: 39-29484
- GNIS feature ID: 1086846

Gasper Township is one of the twelve townships of Preble County, Ohio, United States. The 2020 census found 3,911 people in the township.

== Geography ==
Located in the south central part of the county, it borders the following townships:

- Washington Township - north
- Lanier Township - east
- Gratis Township - southeast corner
- Somers Township - south
- Israel Township - southwest corner
- Dixon Township - west

No municipalities are located in Gasper Township, although the census-designated place of Lake Lakengren lies within the township.

== Name and history ==
It is the only Gasper Township statewide. It was named after John Gasper Potterf (or Batdorf) (1758-1836), A Pennsylvanian of German descent who became an early and wealthy settler of Preble County. Gasper Township was originally part of Washington Township until Potterf convinced the Board of Commissioners to dissever the twenty-four sections of the southern part of Washington Township.

== Government ==
The township is governed by a three-member board of trustees, who are elected in November of odd-numbered years to a four-year term beginning on the following January 1. Two are elected in the year after the presidential election and one is elected in the year before it. There is also an elected township fiscal officer, who serves a four-year term beginning on April 1 of the year after the election, which is held in November of the year before the presidential election. Vacancies in the fiscal officership or on the board of trustees are filled by the remaining trustees.
