= Perry Township, Montgomery County, Ohio =

Township in Ohio, US

- Township
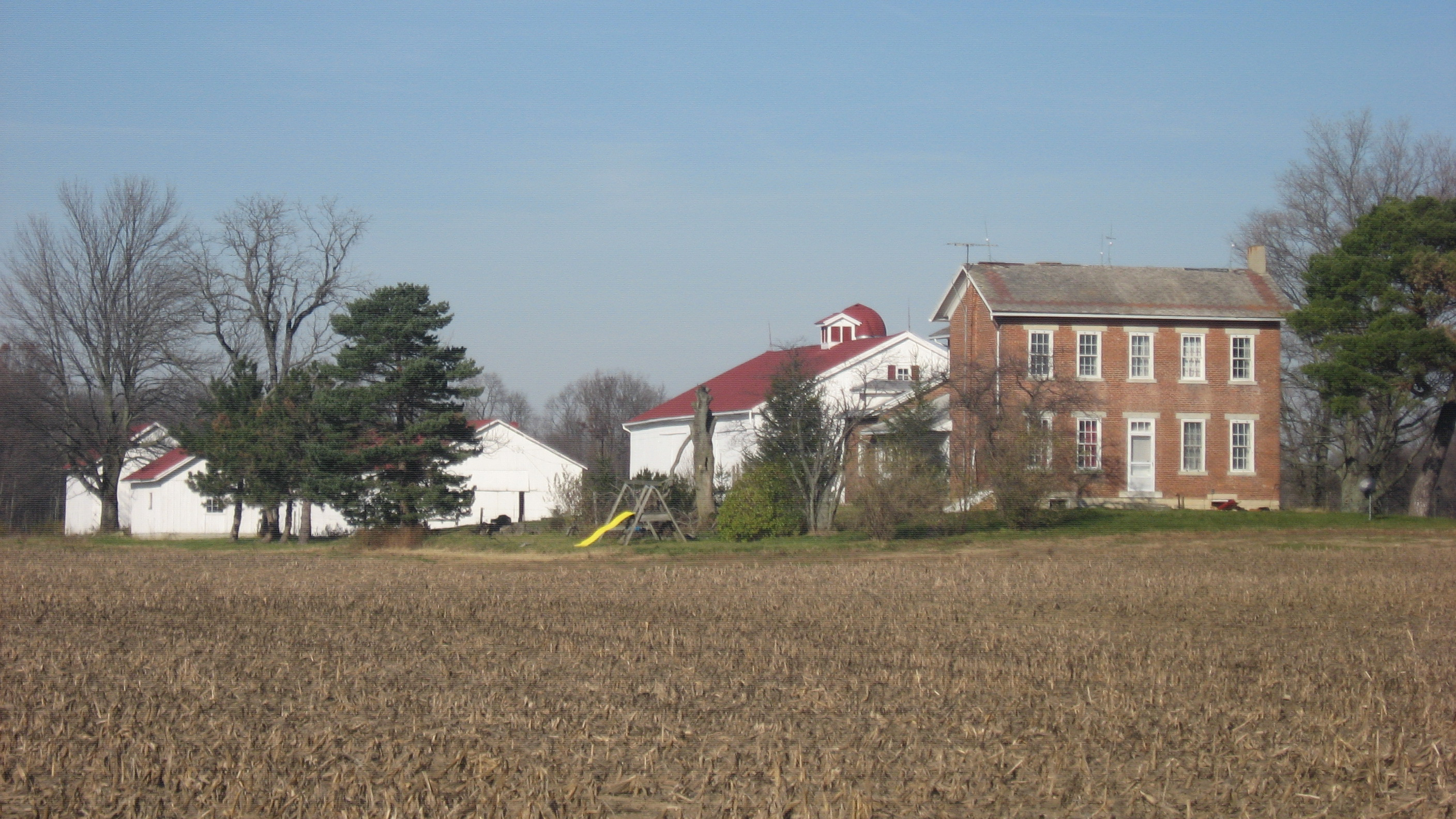
- The George Bixler Farm, a historic site in the township

- Location in Montgomery County and the state of Ohio.
- Coordinates: 39°47′16″N 84°24′59″W
- Country: United States
- State: Ohio
- County: Montgomery

Area
  - Total: 36.5 sq mi (94.6 km^{2})
  - Land: 36.5 sq mi (94.6 km^{2})
  - Water: 0 sq mi (0.0 km^{2})
- Elevation: 991 ft (302 m)

Population (2020)
  - Total: 5,848
  - Density: 160/sq mi (61.8/km^{2})
- Time zone: UTC-5 (Eastern (EST))
  - Summer (DST): UTC-4 (EDT)
- FIPS code: 39-61966
- GNIS feature ID: 1086678
- Website: https://www.perrytownship-mcoh.org/

Perry Township is one of the nine townships of Montgomery County, Ohio, United States. The population was 5,848 at the 2020 census.

== Geography ==
Located in the western part of the county, it borders the following townships:

- Clay Township - north
- Jefferson Township - southeast corner
- Jackson Township - south
- Lanier Township, Preble County - southwest corner
- Twin Township, Preble County - west
- Harrison Township, Preble County - northwest corner

Several populated places are located in Perry Township:

- Part of the city of Brookville, in the north
- Part of the village of New Lebanon, in the south
- The unincorporated community of Pyrmont, in the northwest

== Name and history ==
It is one of twenty-six Perry Townships statewide.

== Government ==
The township is governed by a three-member board of trustees, who are elected in November of odd-numbered years to a four-year term beginning on the following January 1. Two are elected in the year after the presidential election and one is elected in the year before it. There is also an elected township fiscal officer, who serves a four-year term beginning on April 1 of the year after the election, which is held in November of the year before the presidential election. Vacancies in the fiscal officership or on the board of trustees are filled by the remaining trustees.
