= Dodson, Ohio =

Unincorporated community in Ohio, U.S.

Coordinates: 39°51′3″N 84°26′40″W

Dodson is an unincorporated community in Montgomery County, in the U.S. state of Ohio.

== History ==
Dodson was laid out in 1851 by B. H. Dodson, and named for him. The railroad arrived to Dodson in 1852. A post office was established at Dodson in 1853, and remained in operation until 1901.
