= Hopewell Associate Reformed Presbyterian Church =

Historic church in Ohio, United States

- Historic Associate Reformed Church and Cemetery
- U.S. National Register of Historic Places
- U.S. Historic district
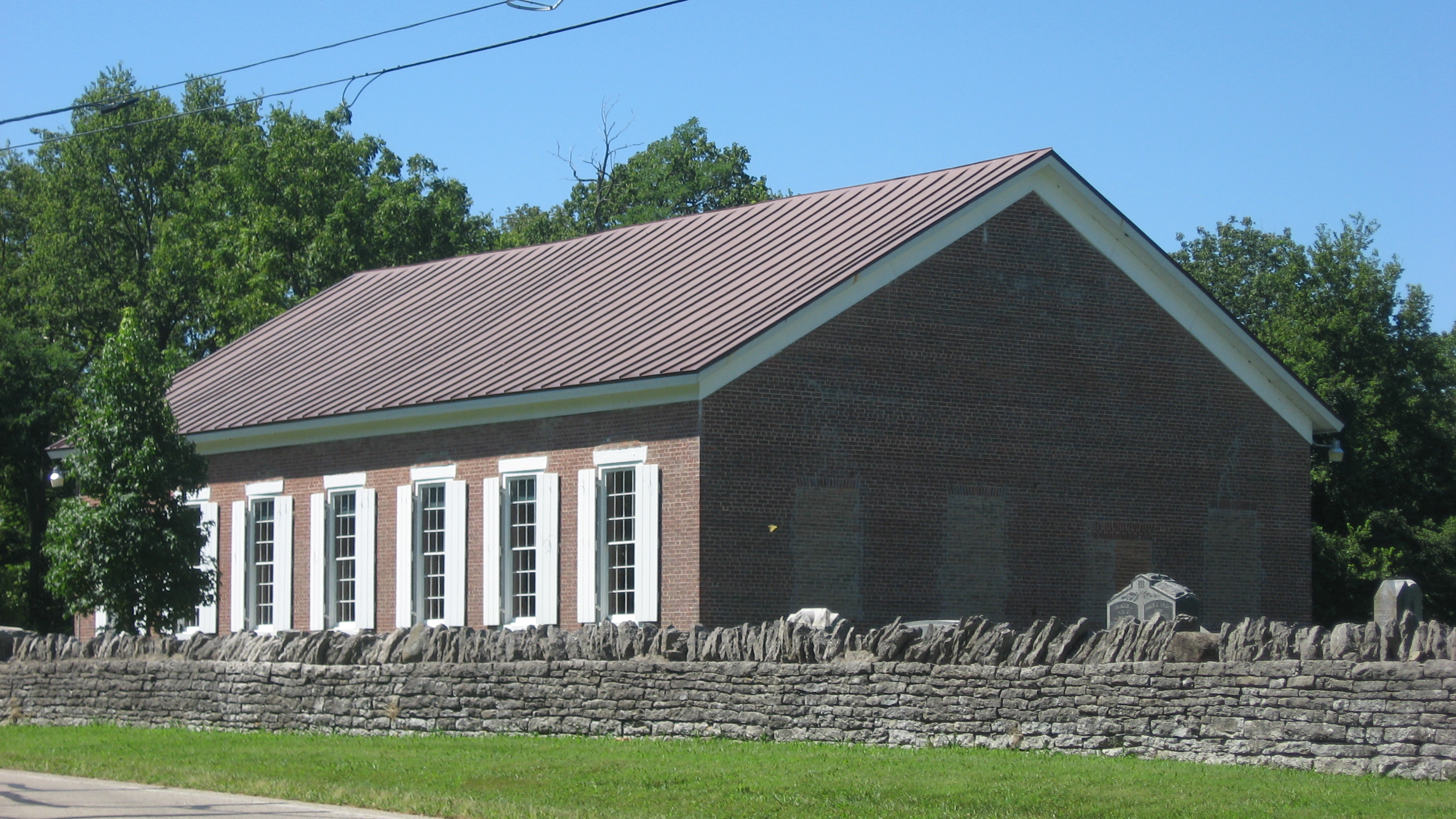

- Location within Ohio Location within the United States
- Nearest city: Morning Sun, Ohio
- Coordinates: 39.60305°N 84.76039°W
- Area: 0 acres (0 ha)
- Built: 1825
- Architectural style: Federal
- NRHP reference No.: 08000161
- Added to NRHP: March 6, 2008

Historic Associate Reformed Church and Cemetery (also known as Historic Hopewell Church Inc) is a historic church in Morning Sun, Ohio.

== History ==
The Hopewell Associate Reformed Church, now referred to as Historic Hopewell Church, is a landmark on the National Register of Historic Places. It was founded in 1808 by Scotch-Irish Presbyterians who chose to leave their settlement in South Carolina and move to Ohio because of their opposition to slavery. In 1814, Reverend Alexander Porter was appointed as Hopewell's first permanent pastor. As the community grew, the original log church was replaced in 1825 by the brick structure that is the Historic Hopewell Church today.

For over 100 years the church and its members were an active congregation, contributing to the settlement of Ohio and leading abolitionist efforts. Hopewell also served as a frequently used stop on the Underground Railroad, providing shelter and worship for slaves who sought freedom. Many members of the church served as conductors on the Underground Railroad.

Throughout the 19th-century, the church community grew so large that at various points in its history, daughter churches were formed in the nearby towns of Fairhaven (1835), Oxford (1837), College Corner (1849), and Morning Sun (1879). In 1915, because of the expansion of the four daughter churches, the Hopewell Church was shuttered. Hopewell remained closed until the 1960s when descendants of the original families and other community members began restoration efforts.

== Today ==
The Hopewell Church holds Sunday services every summer in cooperation with other area churches. A special Christmas service is held each year in December.
