= Darrtown, Ohio =

- Census-designated place
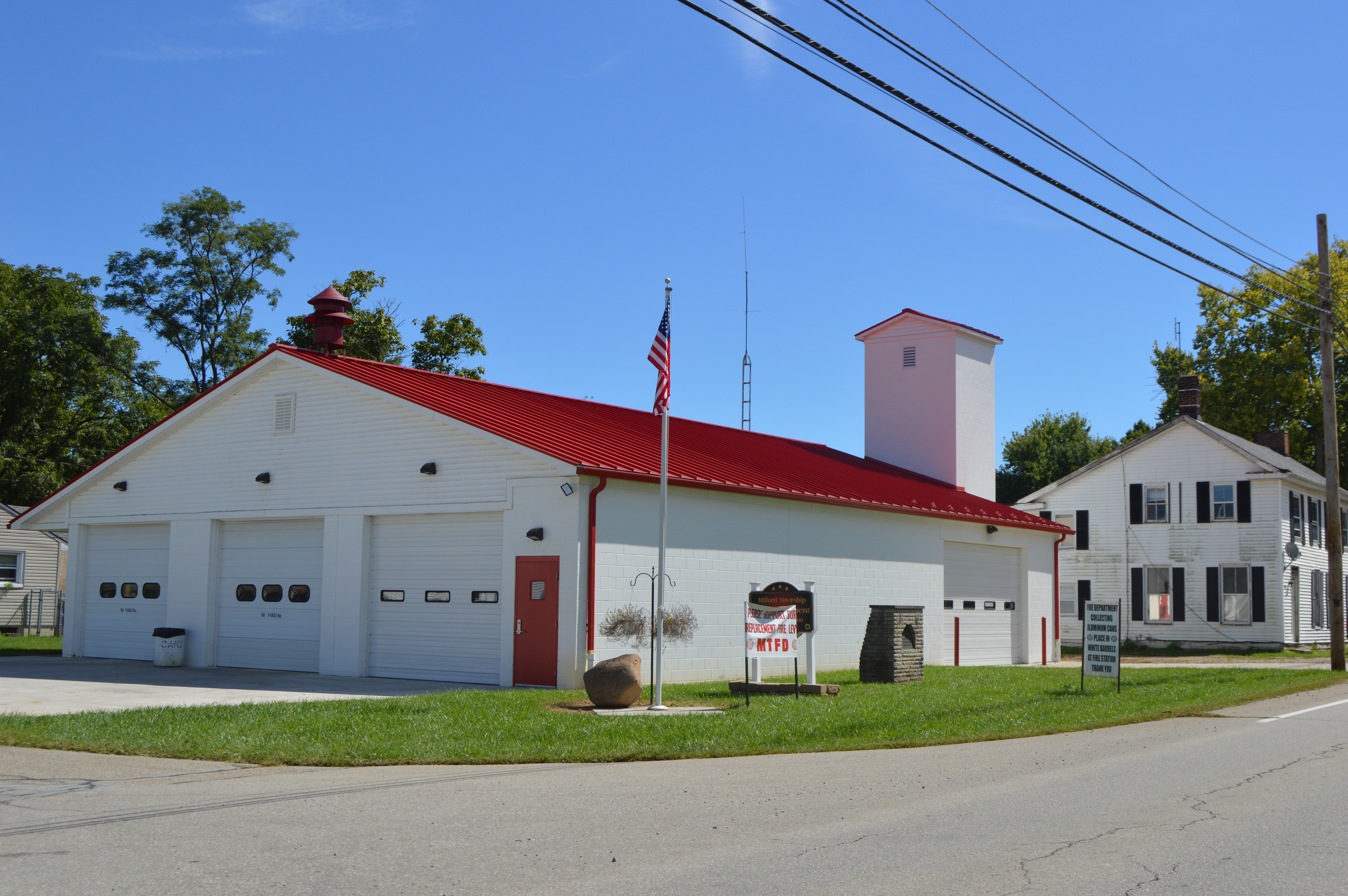
- Fire station on State Route 177

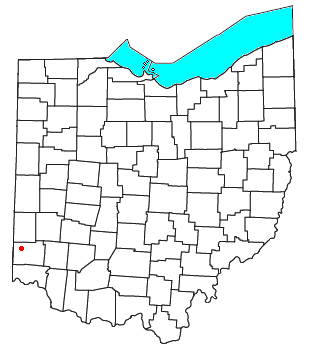
- Location of Darrtown in Ohio
- Coordinates: 39°30′03″N 84°40′18″W
- Country: United States
- State: Ohio
- County: Butler
- Township: Milford

Area
  - Total: 2.36 sq mi (6.10 km^{2})
  - Land: 2.36 sq mi (6.10 km^{2})
  - Water: 0 sq mi (0.00 km^{2})
- Elevation: 751 ft (229 m)

Population (2020)
  - Total: 514
  - Density: 218.2/sq mi (84.23/km^{2})
- Time zone: UTC-5 (Eastern (EST))
  - Summer (DST): UTC-4 (EDT)
- ZIP code: 45056
- FIPS code: 39-20268
- GNIS feature ID: 2584361

Darrtown is a census-designated place (CDP) in Milford Township, Butler County, Ohio, United States. The population was 514 at the 2020 census.

== History ==
Darrtown was laid out in 1814 by Conrad Darr, and named for him. A post office called Darrtown was established in 1825, and remained in operation until 1907.

== Geography ==
Darrtown is located in northwestern Butler County, in the southwest part of Milford Township, in the valley of Four Mile Creek.

State Route 177 runs through the center of the community, leading 8 miles (13 km) southeast to the city of Hamilton. Oxford is 5 miles (8 km) to the west via Route 177 and Route 73.

According to the United States Census Bureau, the CDP has a total area of 2.4 square miles (6.1 km^{2}), all land.

== Demographics ==
Historical population
Census	Pop.	Note	%±
2020	514		—
U.S. Decennial Census

== Notable person ==
- Walter Alston, former MLB player for the Saint Louis Cardinals and former manager for the Los Angeles Dodgers
