= National Register of Historic Places listings in Preble County, Ohio =

Location of Preble County in Ohio

This is a list of the National Register of Historic Places listings in Preble County, Ohio.

This is intended to be a complete list of the properties and districts on the National Register of Historic Places in Preble County, Ohio, United States. The locations of National Register properties and districts for which the latitude and longitude coordinates are included below, may be seen in an online map.

There are 20 properties and districts listed on the National Register in the county.

This National Park Service list is complete through NPS recent listings posted March 14, 2025.

== Current listings ==
	Name on the Register	Image	Date listed	Location	City or town	Description
1	Acton House	Acton House	September 5, 1985 (#85001944)	115 W. Main St. 39°44′38″N 84°38′15″W	Eaton	
2	Brubaker Covered Bridge	Brubaker Covered Bridge	June 11, 1975 (#75001527)	West of Gratis on Aukerman Creek Rd. 39°39′06″N 84°32′39″W	Gratis Township	
3	Bunker Hill House	Bunker Hill House	September 28, 2001 (#01001062)	7919 State Route 177 in Fairhaven; 39°38′13″N 84°46′20″W	Dixon Township	
4	Camden City Hall and Opera House	Camden City Hall and Opera House	February 12, 1998 (#98000100)	54 W. Central Ave. 39°37′44″N 84°39′00″W	Camden	
5	Camden Public School	Camden Public School	January 30, 1998 (#98000041)	110 W. Central Ave. 39°37′48″N 84°38′33″W	Camden	
6	Christman Covered Bridge	Christman Covered Bridge	October 22, 1976 (#76001516)	1.5 miles northwest of Eaton; 39°46′13″N 84°39′18″W	Washington Township	
7	Daniel Christman Homestead	Daniel Christman Homestead	November 4, 1982 (#82001486)	West of Eaton on U.S. Route 35; 39°45′44″N 84°40′04″W	Washington Township	
8	Eaton High School	Eaton High School	December 15, 2014 (#14001052)	307 N. Cherry St. 39°44′50″N 84°38′08″W	Eaton	
9	Euphemia Inn and Tavern		August 15, 2024 (#100010659)	303 W. Cumberland Street (Route 40, National Road); 39°51′16″N 84°32′27″W	Lewisburg	
10	Fort St. Clair Site	Fort St. Clair Site	November 10, 1970 (#70000514)	1 mile west of downtown Eaton; 39°44′16″N 84°39′15″W	Eaton	
11	Geeting Covered Bridge	Geeting Covered Bridge	August 19, 1975 (#75001528)	2 miles west of Lewisburg on Price Rd. 39°50′37″N 84°35′50″W	Monroe Township	
12	Harshman Covered Bridge	Harshman Covered Bridge	September 29, 1976 (#76001517)	4 miles north of Fairhaven on Concord-Fairhaven Rd. spanning Four Mile Creek; 39°42′09″N 84°46′11″W	Dixon Township	
13	Historic Associate Reformed Church and Cemetery	Historic Associate Reformed Church and Cemetery	March 6, 2008 (#08000161)	6471 Camden-College Corner Rd. 39°36′11″N 84°45′38″W	Israel Township	
14	Hueston Woods Park Mound	Hueston Woods Park Mound	November 5, 1971 (#71000650)	Trail near Class A Campground in Hueston Woods State Park; 39°35′05″N 84°46′44″W	Israel Township	
15	Lange Hotel	Lange Hotel	January 25, 1991 (#90002213)	1 W. Dayton St. 39°44′41″N 84°31′57″W	West Alexandria	
16	Roberts Covered Bridge	Roberts Covered Bridge	September 3, 1971 (#71000651)	City park in southwestern Eaton, over Seven Mile Creek; 39°44′26″N 84°38′20″W	Eaton	The Roberts Covered Bride is the oldest covered bridge in Ohio, the second oldest covered bridge in the United States, and the oldest of the six remaining double-barreled covered bridges in the United States. After being vandalized and heavily damaged by a fire in 1986, it was restored and moved from its original location 3 miles south of Eaton over Seven Mile Creek. It currently sits about 150 feet north of the St. Clair Street Bridge, also listed on the National Register of Historic Places.
17	St. Clair Street Bridge	St. Clair Street Bridge	September 21, 1978 (#78002175)	Over Seven Mile Creek; 39°44′24″N 84°38′19″W	Eaton	
18	George B. Unger House	George B. Unger House	November 15, 1978 (#78002176)	29 E. Dayton St. 39°44′40″N 84°31′51″W	West Alexandria	
19	Warnke Covered Bridge	Warnke Covered Bridge	October 8, 1976 (#76001518)	Northeast of Lewisburg on Swamp Creek Rd. 39°52′26″N 84°30′53″W	Harrison Township	
20	West Alexandria Depot	West Alexandria Depot	August 11, 2006 (#06000696)	71 E. Dayton St. 39°44′42″N 84°31′43″W	West Alexandria	

== See also ==
- List of National Historic Landmarks in Ohio
- Listings in neighboring counties: Butler, Darke, Montgomery, Union (IN), Wayne (IN)
- National Register of Historic Places listings in Ohio
