= Everett S. Sherman =

Covered bridge builder in Ohio (1831–1897)

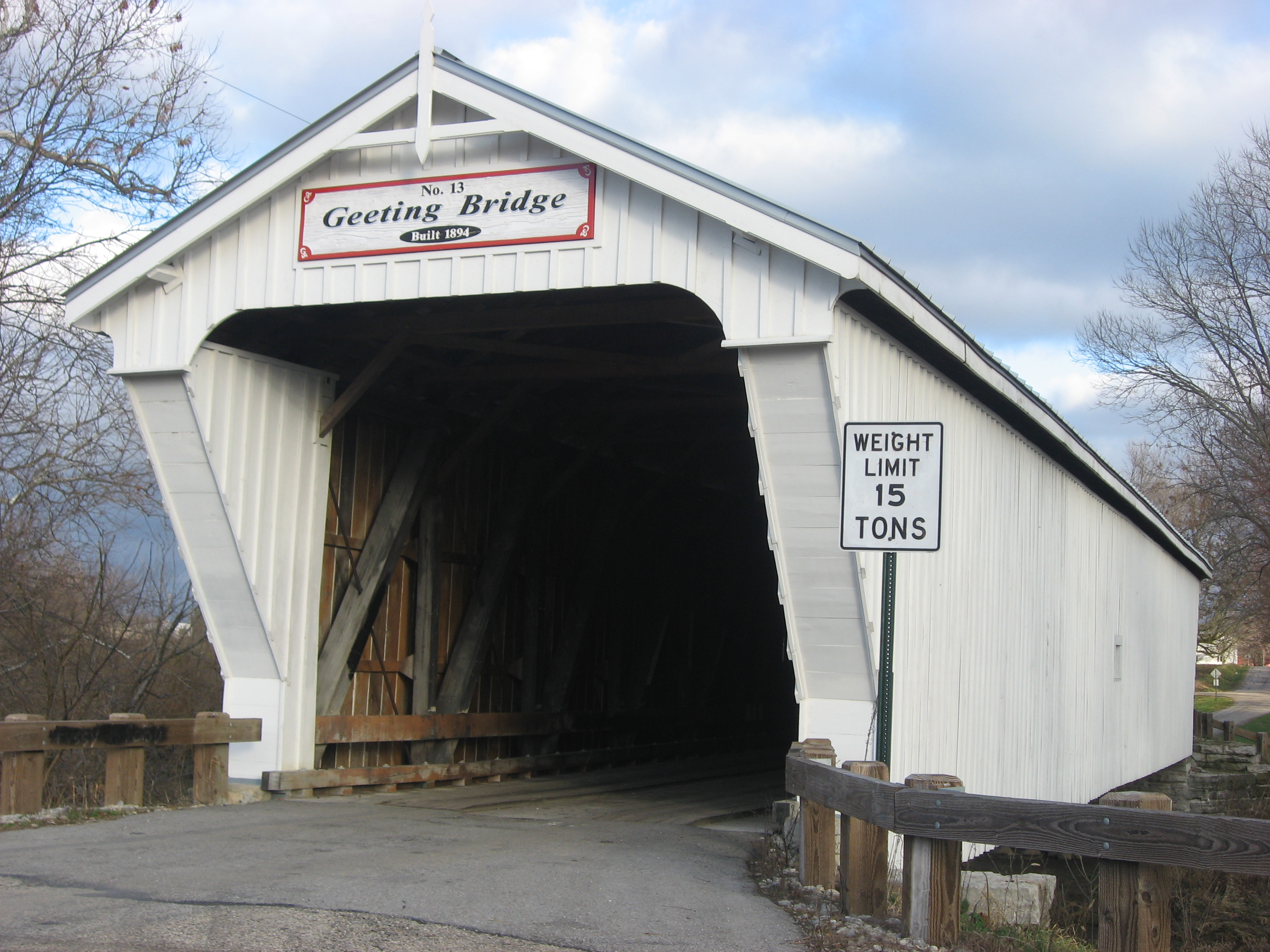
Geeting Covered Bridge

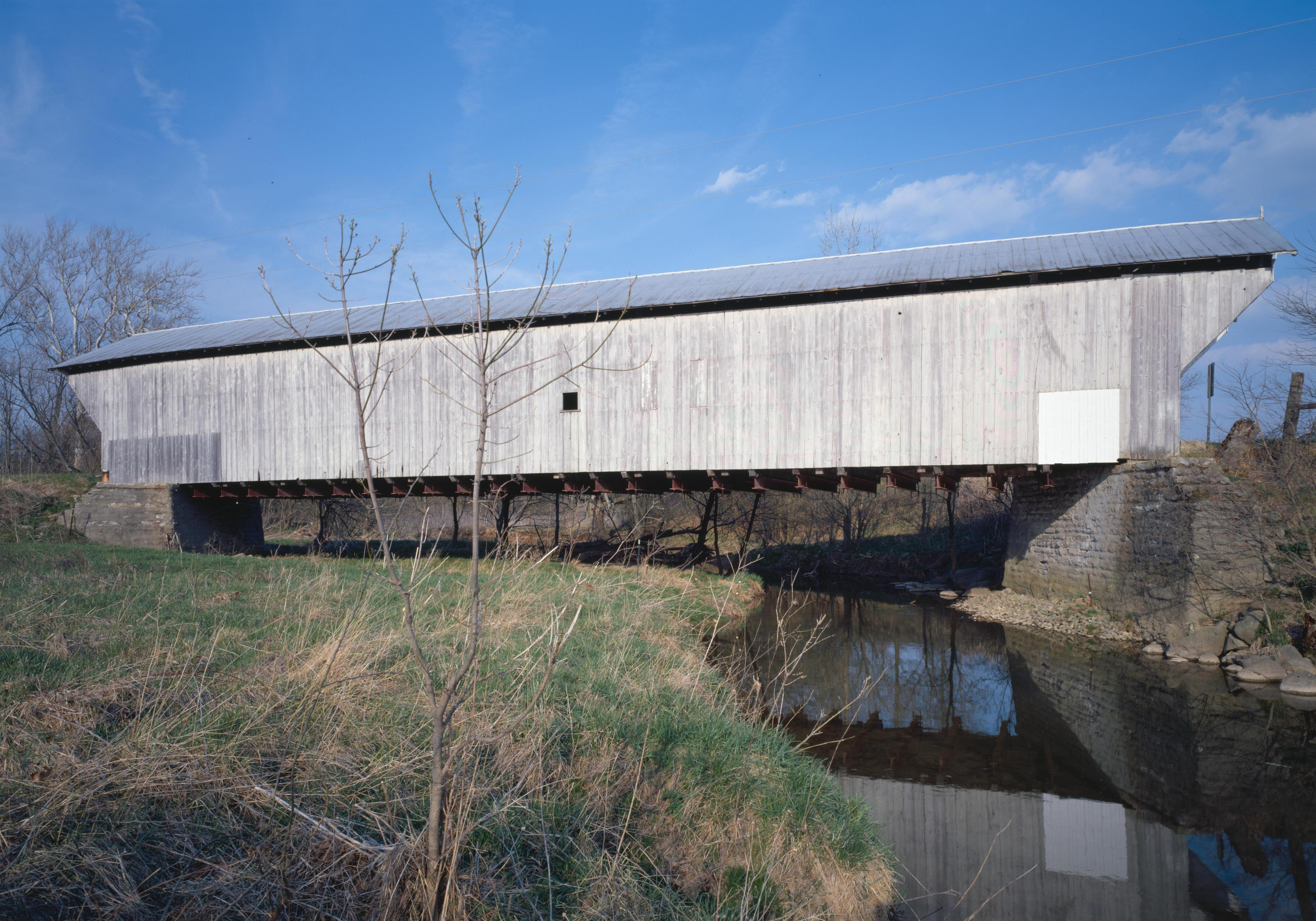
Harshman Covered Bridge

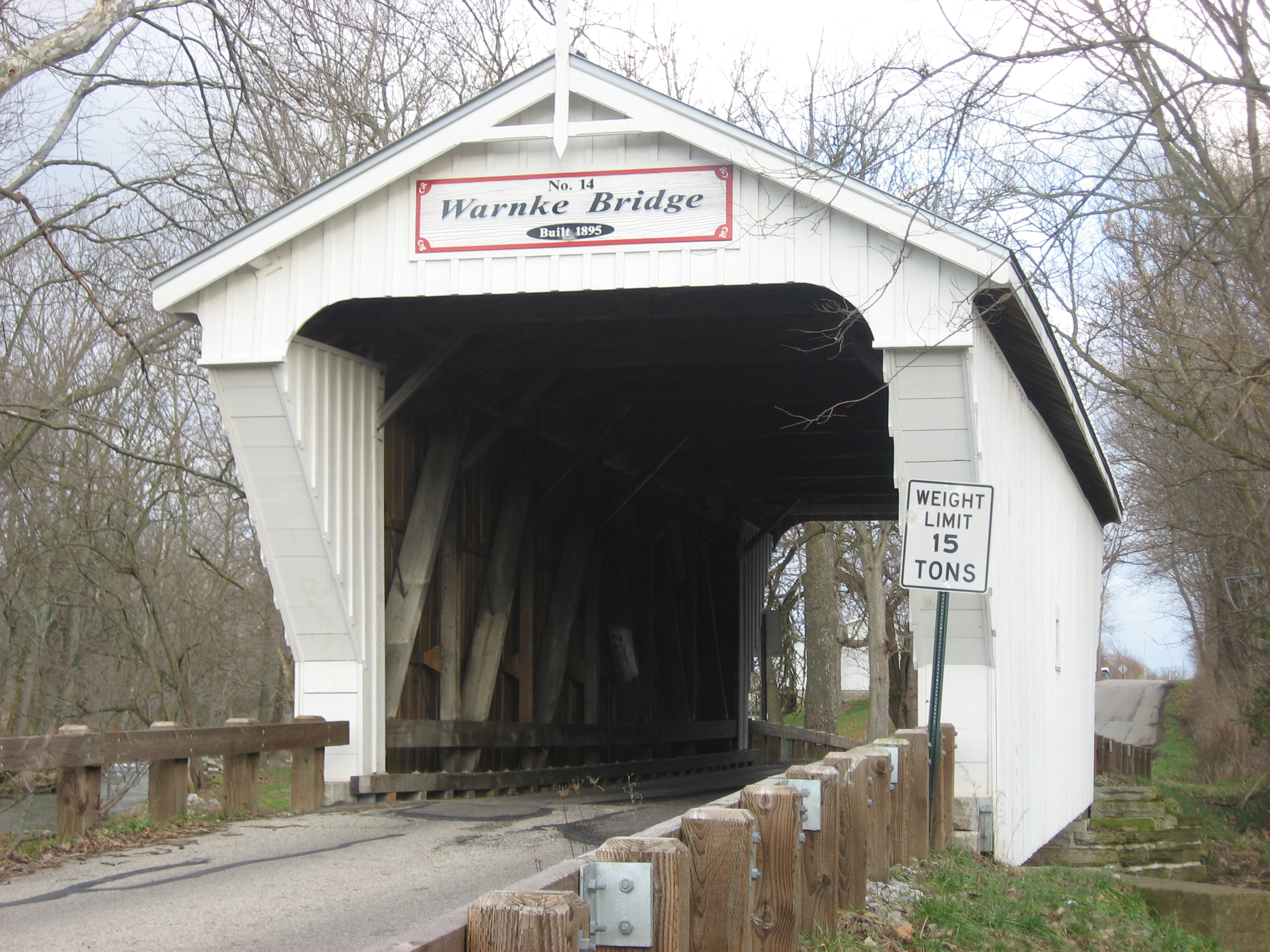
Warnke Covered Bridge

Everett S. Sherman (1831-1897) was a covered bridge builder in Ohio. He lived and built bridges in Delaware County then moved to Preble County after a storm destroyed many of its bridges.

He revived a technology of Childs truss bridges, of which only a handful of examples—perhaps only seven according to a 2003 report—survive in the United States. The Childs truss was patented by Horace Childs in 1846. It never became popular, but, after its patent expired, was adopted by Sherman for bridges in Ohio late in the 1800s. Sherman adapted the Childs design to vary the size of beams according to loads carried by them, rather than using uniform beams.

A number of his works are listed on the U.S. National Register of Historic Places.

Works include:

- Brubaker Covered Bridge, W of Gratis on Aukerman Creek Rd., Gratis, Ohio, NRHP-listed
- Chambers Road Covered Bridge, 1.5 mi. NE of Olive Green, Olive Green, Ohio, NRHP-listed
- Christman Covered Bridge, 1.5 mi. NW of Eaton on SR 12, Eaton, Ohio, NRHP-listed
- Geeting Covered Bridge, 2 mi. W of Lewisburg on Price Rd., Lewisburg, Ohio, NRHP-listed
- Harshman Covered Bridge, 4 mi. N of Fairhaven on Concord-Fairhaven Rd. spanning Four Mile Creek, Fairhaven, Ohio, NRHP-listed
- Warnke Covered Bridge, NE of Lewisburg on Swamp Creek Rd., Lewisburg, Ohio, NRHP-listed
