= Geeting Covered Bridge =

- U.S. National Register of Historic Places
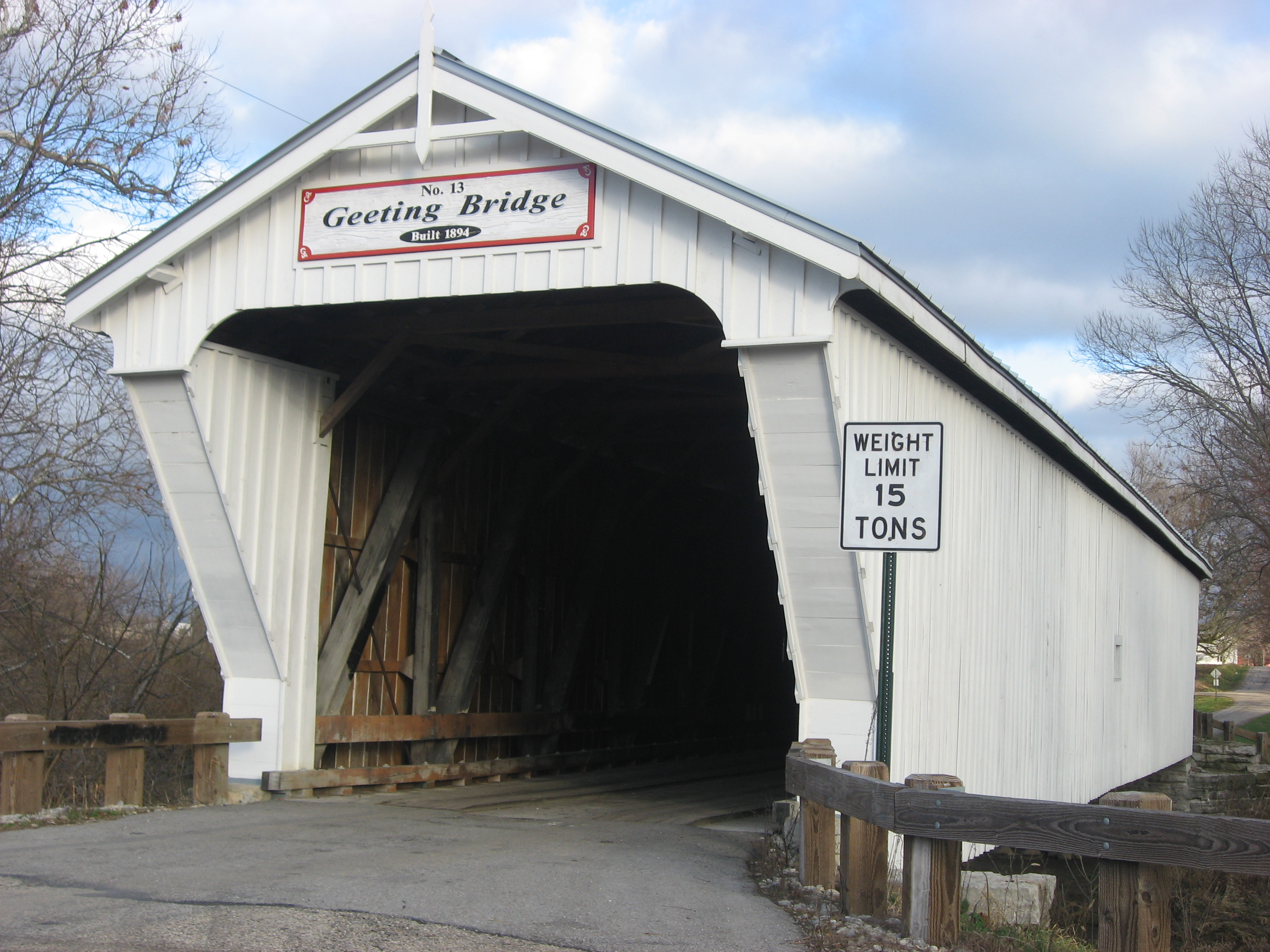

- Location within Ohio Location within the United States
- Interactive map of Geeting Covered Bridge
- Nearest city: Lewisburg, Ohio
- Coordinates: 39°50′37″N 84°35′50″W
- Area: less than one acre
- Built: 1894
- Built by: Everett S. Sherman
- Architectural style: One-span Childs truss
- NRHP reference No.: 75001528
- Added to NRHP: August 19, 1975

The Geeting Covered Bridge, also known as Geeting Bridge, is a historic covered bridge crossing Price's Creek on Price Road west of Lewisburg, Ohio, United States. It was built in 1894 by Everett S. Sherman, one of at least 20 covered bridges built by Sherman in Preble County, Ohio. The abutments were built by the Koppee Brothers. It was listed on the National Register of Historic Places in 1975.

It is a 100-foot-long (30 m) bridge with 7 feet additional overhang. All of the white pine boards used in constructing this bridge were purchased from Cadillac, Michigan lumber suppliers Cobb and Mitchell. The bridge was built in 1894 at a cost of $2,691. It has had extensive repair and rehabilitation work done over the years, including roof replacement following a windstorm in 1914, roof repairs after damage caused by a truck in 1969, and rehabilitation work in 1973 and in the 2000s. The most recent rehabilitation of 2008 was at a cost of $379,753.

It was named for Dave Geeting, who owned land to the south and west of the bridge, and was the first to drive across it.
