= Brubaker Covered Bridge =

- U.S. National Register of Historic Places
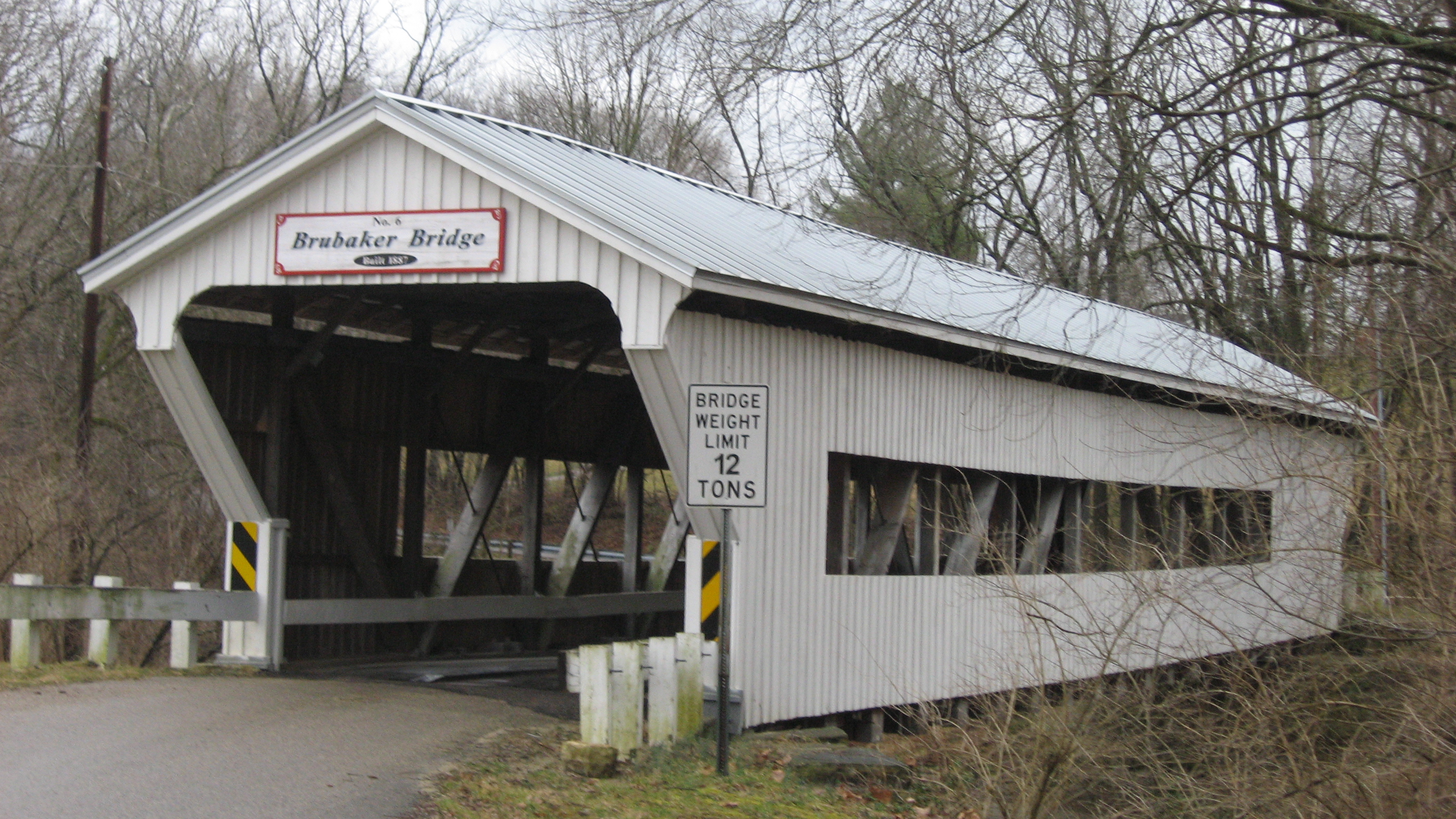
- Western portal and southern (upstream) side of the bridge

- Location within Ohio Location within the United States
- Nearest city: Gratis, Ohio
- Coordinates: 39°39′6″N 84°32′39″W
- Area: less than one acre
- Built: 1887
- Architect: Everett S. Sherman
- Architectural style: One-span Childs truss
- NRHP reference No.: 75001527
- Added to NRHP: June 11, 1975

Brubaker Covered Bridge runs across Sandy Run, to the west-northwest of Gratis Township, Preble County, Ohio. It is 85 feet (26 m) in length, and was built in 1887 by Everett S. Sherman. The bridge is of Childs Truss construction.
