= Derek Morris (ice hockey) =

Canadian ice hockey player (born 1978)

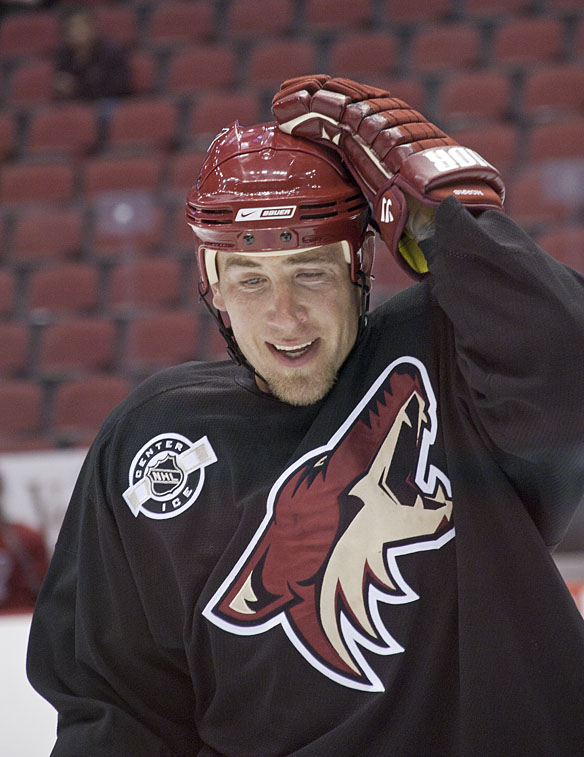
- Morris with the Phoenix Coyotes in 2010
- Born: August 24, 1978 (age 48) Edmonton, Alberta, Canada
- Height: 6 ft 0 in (183 cm)
- Weight: 221 lb (100 kg; 15 st 11 lb)
- Position: Defence
- Shot: Right
- Played for: Calgary Flames; Colorado Avalanche; Phoenix Coyotes; New York Rangers; Boston Bruins
- National team: Canada
- NHL draft: 13th overall, 1996; Calgary Flames
- Playing career: 1997–2014

Derek Terrence Morris (born August 24, 1978) is a Canadian former professional ice hockey defenceman who played over 1,100 games in the National Hockey League (NHL) for the Calgary Flames, Colorado Avalanche, Phoenix Coyotes, Boston Bruins and New York Rangers. He was originally drafted out of the Western Hockey League (WHL) 13th overall by the Calgary Flames in the 1996 NHL entry draft.

== Playing career ==
Morris played minor hockey in the Alberta Midget Hockey League (AMHL) with the Red Deer Chiefs and was awarded the Brian Benning Trophy as the league's top defenceman in 1995. He went on to play major junior with the Regina Pats of the Western Hockey League (WHL). After his rookie WHL season, in which he scored 52 points in 67 games, Morris was drafted 13th overall by the Calgary Flames in the 1996 NHL entry draft, a somewhat surprising pick as Morris had been projected to be a third- or fourth-round pick. He returned to play a second season with the Pats, improving to 18 goals and 75 points before turning pro.

Following Morris's 1996–97 WHL season with the Pats, he was assigned to the Calgary's American Hockey League (AHL) affiliate, the Saint John Flames for the final seven games of the regular season, as well as five post-season games. In 1997–98, he scored 9 goals and 29 points in his NHL rookie season with the Flames, earning NHL All-Rookie Team honours. He continued to improve to 34, then 38 points in his second and third seasons with the Flames before an injury-shortened season in 2000–01 kept him to 28 points in 51 games.

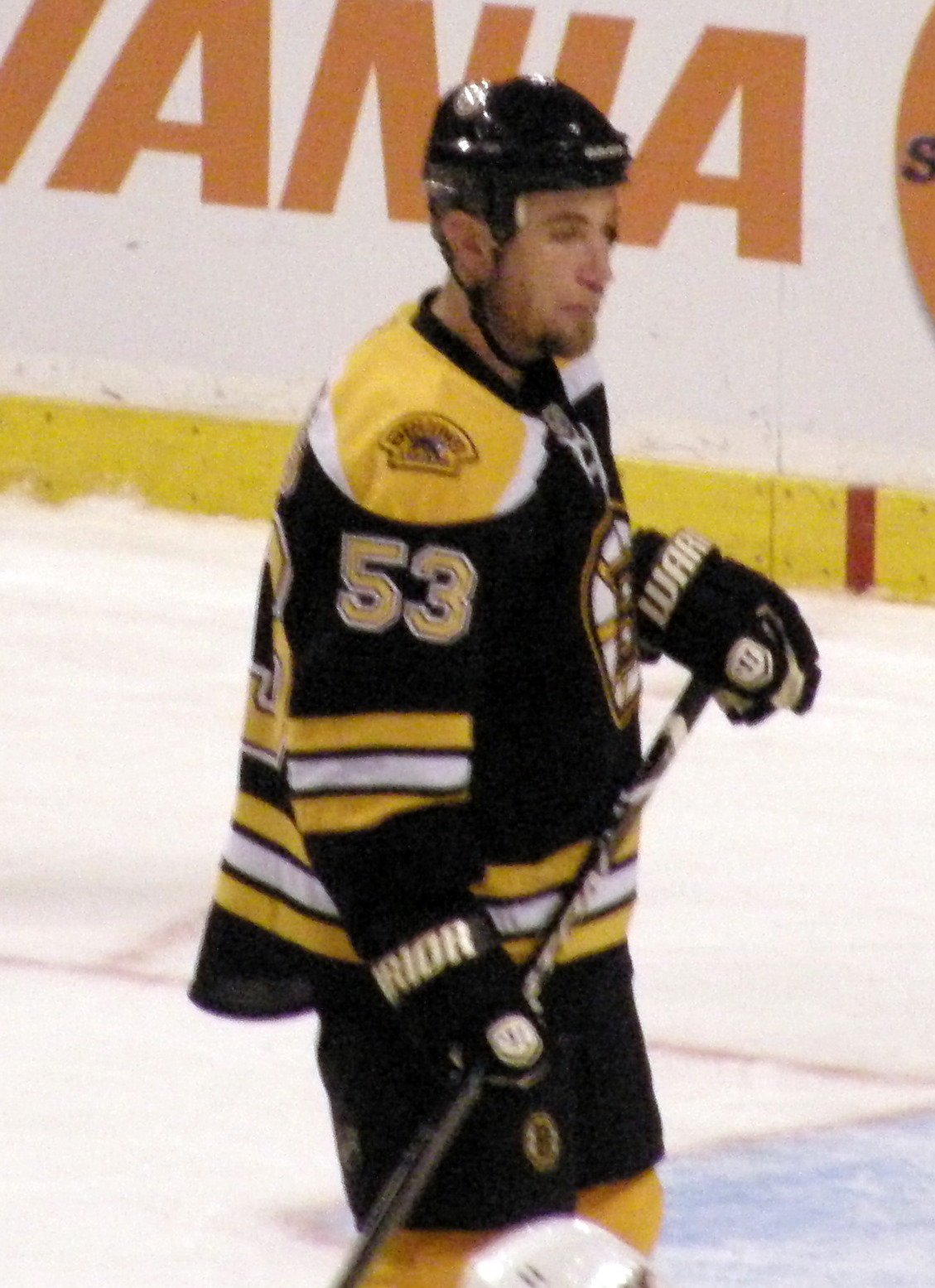
Morris with the Bruins.

In 2001–02, Morris was again sidelined after sustaining a left wrist injury. During the season, he was unintentionally involved in an incident in a game against the Columbus Blue Jackets on March 16, 2002, when an Espen Knutsen slap shot deflected off him and into the stands, striking 13-year-old Brittanie Cecil in the temple. She died from the impact two days later, prompting the NHL to implement protective netting at the ends of the rinks at the start of the following season. Morris completed the season with 34 points in 61 games.

After five seasons with Calgary, reaching the 30-point mark four times, Morris was traded to the Colorado Avalanche. He made an immediate impact with the Avalanche in his first season, tallying a career-high 11 goals, 37 assists and 48 points in 2002–03.

The following season, Morris was traded for the second time in as many campaigns, this time to the Phoenix Coyotes. He completed the 2003–04 season playing in 14 games and recording 2 assists with the Coyotes after being traded. He finished with a combined 32 points. In his first full season with the Coyotes in 2005–06, Morris tallied 28 points in 53 games, then recorded back-to-back 25-point seasons the following two campaigns.

On March 4, 2009, Morris was again dealt at the trade deadline, this time to the New York Rangers. He did not re-sign with the Rangers in the off-season, instead signing a one-year contract with the Boston Bruins worth $3.3 million on July 24, 2009.

On March 3, 2010, Morris was traded back to the Coyotes for a conditional fourth-round pick in the 2011 NHL entry draft. After the season, Morris signed a four-year, $11 million contract extension with the Coyotes. With Phoenix, Morris went deep into the 2012 Stanley Cup playoffs. His highlight of the playoffs was a shot from centre ice in Game 1 of the Conference finals that beat Los Angeles Kings netminder Jonathan Quick. However, the Coyotes lost the series in five games.

Though he never officially announced his retirement, Morris has not been active since the 2013–14 season. He did have a deal with the Pittsburgh Penguins in August 2015, but it fell through.

== International play ==
Medal record

Men's ice hockey

Representing Canada

World Championships
Gold medal – first place	2004 Czech Republic	

Morris has represented Canada on three occasions at the World Championships. After appearances in 1999 and 2001, he won his first gold medal with Canada at the 2004 World Championships in the Czech Republic. He contributed five assists in the gold-medal effort.

== Personal life ==
Morris has three sons: Traiten, Presley and Asher. He coached for his son Presley's team, The Jr. Coyotes 02 AA, and also for eldest son Traiten's team, The Jr. Coyotes 00 AA. Morris settled in North Scottsdale, Arizona. In the summers, he and his family return to Sylvan Lake, Alberta.

Morris is currently an assistant high school coach with Chaparral High.

== Career statistics ==
=== Regular season and playoffs ===
			Regular season					Playoffs
Season	Team	League	GP	G	A	Pts	PIM	GP	G	A	Pts	PIM
1994–95	Red Deer Chiefs AAA	AMHL	31	6	35	41	74	—	—	—	—	—
1995–96	Regina Pats	WHL	67	8	44	52	70	11	1	7	8	26
1996–97	Regina Pats	WHL	67	18	57	75	180	5	0	3	3	9
1996–97	Saint John Flames	AHL	7	0	3	3	7	5	0	3	3	7
1997–98	Calgary Flames	NHL	82	9	20	29	88	—	—	—	—	—
1998–99	Calgary Flames	NHL	71	7	27	34	73	—	—	—	—	—
1999–2000	Calgary Flames	NHL	78	9	29	38	80	—	—	—	—	—
2000–01	Saint John Flames	AHL	3	1	2	3	2	—	—	—	—	—
2000–01	Calgary Flames	NHL	51	5	23	28	56	—	—	—	—	—
2001–02	Calgary Flames	NHL	61	4	30	34	88	—	—	—	—	—
2002–03	Colorado Avalanche	NHL	75	11	37	48	68	7	0	3	3	6
2003–04	Colorado Avalanche	NHL	69	6	22	28	47	—	—	—	—	—
2003–04	Phoenix Coyotes	NHL	14	0	4	4	2	—	—	—	—	—
2005–06	Phoenix Coyotes	NHL	53	6	21	27	54	—	—	—	—	—
2006–07	Phoenix Coyotes	NHL	82	6	19	25	115	—	—	—	—	—
2007–08	Phoenix Coyotes	NHL	82	8	17	25	83	—	—	—	—	—
2008–09	Phoenix Coyotes	NHL	57	5	7	12	24	—	—	—	—	—
2008–09	New York Rangers	NHL	18	0	8	8	16	7	0	2	2	0
2009–10	Boston Bruins	NHL	58	3	22	25	26	—	—	—	—	—
2009–10	Phoenix Coyotes	NHL	18	1	3	4	11	7	1	3	4	11
2010–11	Phoenix Coyotes	NHL	77	5	11	16	58	—	—	—	—	—
2011–12	Phoenix Coyotes	NHL	59	2	9	11	38	16	2	4	6	24
2012–13	Phoenix Coyotes	NHL	39	0	11	11	36	—	—	—	—	—
2013–14	Phoenix Coyotes	NHL	63	5	12	17	41	—	—	—	—	—
NHL totals			1,107	92	332	424	1,004	37	3	12	15	41

=== International ===
Year	Team	Event	Result	GP	G	A	Pts	PIM
1999	Canada	WC	4th	10	0	4	4	6
2001	Canada	WC	5th	7	1	1	2	8
2004	Canada	WC	1st place, gold medalist(s)	9	0	5	5	35
Senior totals				26	1	10	11	49

== Awards and honours ==
Award	Year
AMHL
Brian Benning Trophy (Top Defenceman)	1995
WHL
East First All-Star Team	1997
CHL Second All-Star Team	1997
NHL
All-Rookie Team	1998

== Transactions ==
- October 1, 2002 – Traded to the Colorado Avalanche by the Calgary Flames (alongside Jeff Shantz and Dean McAmmond) for Chris Drury and Stéphane Yelle.
- March 9, 2004 – Traded to the Phoenix Coyotes by Colorado (alongside Keith Ballard) for Ossi Väänänen, Chris Gratton and Phoenix's second-round pick (Paul Stastny) in 2005 NHL entry draft.
- March 4, 2009 – Traded to the New York Rangers by Phoenix for Nigel Dawes, Dimitri Kalinin and Petr Průcha.
- July 4, 2009 – Signed a one-year contract with Boston Bruins as a free agent.
- March 3, 2010 – Traded to Phoenix from Boston for a fourth-round pick in the 2011 NHL entry draft.
- July 1, 2010 – Signed a four-year contract with Phoenix.

== See also ==
- List of NHL players with 1,000 games played

Awards and achievements
Preceded by Denis Gauthier	Calgary Flames' first-round draft pick 1996	Succeeded by Daniel Tkaczuk
