= Death of Brittanie Cecil =

2002 American ice hockey fatality

Brittanie Cecil
- Undated portrait of Cecil
- Born: Brittanie Nichole Cecil; March 20, 1988
- Died: March 18, 2002 (aged 13); Columbus, Ohio, U.S.
- Cause of death: Result of injuries sustained after being hit by a puck at an NHL game
- Resting place: West Alexandria, Ohio, U.S.
- Education: Twin Valley South Middle School

Brittanie Nichole Cecil (March 20, 1988 – March 18, 2002) was an American ice hockey fan who died from injuries suffered when a puck was deflected into the stands and struck her in the left temple at Nationwide Arena in Columbus, Ohio, on March 16, 2002. It is currently the only fan fatality in the history of the National Hockey League (NHL). Because of Cecil's death, the league implemented mandatory netting at both ends of the rink in every arena at the beginning of the next NHL season to protect spectators from errant pucks.

== Personal life ==
Born on March 20, 1988, Cecil was the daughter of David and Jody Cecil (née Naudascher). A native of West Alexandria, Ohio, a rural community near Dayton, Cecil was an avid sports fan and soccer player, competing in a state tournament with her team, the Orange Crush, at eleven years old. After the team qualified for the state tournament, mayor Carol Lunsford declared the day Orange Crush Day. Cecil attended Twin Valley South Middle School as a cheerleader, student council member and an honor student.

== Death ==
Cecil was watching the Columbus Blue Jackets play the Calgary Flames on March 16, 2002, with tickets received as an early gift from her father for her 14th birthday. With 12:10 remaining in the second period, a shot by the Blue Jackets' Espen Knutsen was deflected by the Flames' Derek Morris and went over the glass behind the net, striking her in the left temple. Play carried on as the players were unaware of any injury. Although Cecil had suffered a skull fracture, she walked to a first-aid station before being taken to Columbus Children's Hospital in an ambulance operated by the Columbus Division of Fire with her only visible injury being a gash on her forehead.

At the hospital, Cecil suffered an initial seizure and was admitted; however, she appeared to be recovering the next day, both communicative and ambulatory, and without complaints of pain or dizziness. A CT scan, however, had failed to catch a torn vertebral artery, resulting in severe clotting and swelling of the brain. On March 18, she developed a high fever and lost consciousness. She died nearly 48 hours after being struck, at 5:15 p.m. on March 18, 2002.

Cecil's funeral was held at Preble Memory Gardens Chapel near West Alexandria, after which a procession of more than 150 cars followed the hearse to Fairview Cemetery, where she was buried. Attending the funeral was Blue Jackets general manager Doug MacLean, who spoke on behalf of the team.

== Aftermath ==
The Thursday after the incident, a moment of silence was observed for Cecil at the next Blue Jackets home game, played against the Detroit Red Wings. Her initials (BNC) were worn by the team's players on their helmets for the remainder of the season.

Knutsen and Morris expressed remorse following Cecil's death. Morris explained, "You try to say, 'It happens all the time,' but you can't. I don't know how many times pucks get deflected over the glass, but it doesn't make it any better. You can always say, 'It's not my fault,' but you always feel like it is, a little." Knutsen, who was given the option of sitting out the next game by Blue Jackets coach Dave King but chose to play, told reporters, "I think about it all the time. It was a terrible accident, and I cannot get it off my mind." In December 2010, Knutsen met with Cecil's family, bringing some closure to both parties.

NHL Commissioner Gary Bettman said in a June 2002 Board of Governors meeting that "even though Brittanie Cecil was the first fatality in the 85-year history of the league, and probably 800 million fans have attended our games, we still wanted the look of doing the right thing. So we concluded on the basis of the report that there were measures we could take that would reduce the incidence of pucks entering the stands without it interfering with the game, or the fans' enjoyment of the game, and we're doing that." Improved safety measures became league policy that month, standardizing the height of glass partitions between the rink and stands to be at least five feet (1.5 m) in height, and adding ceiling-mounted netting that reached the top of the partition. It was noted by ESPN that America West Arena (now Mortgage Matchup Center) in Phoenix, Arizona, was the only NHL venue to have netting of this kind before Cecil's death, though similar measures had been taken in other venues and leagues.

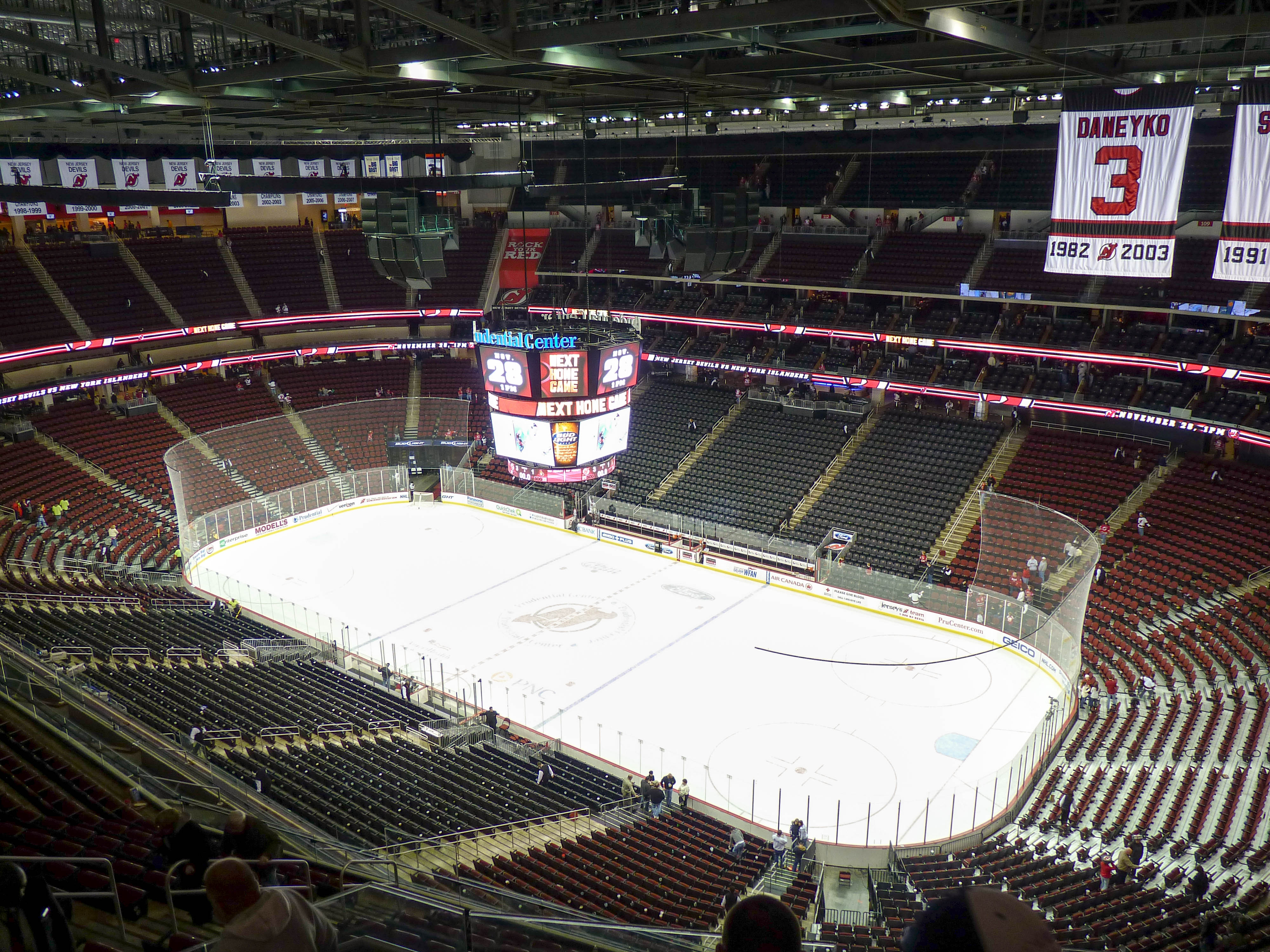
A wide shot of Prudential Center, the home arena of the New Jersey Devils, showing the mandatory netting behind each goal area

In a 2012 retrospective for Yahoo Sports by sportswriter Greg Wyshynski, he noted that, despite Cecil's death, there had been vocal resistance at the time by fans, including himself, to the implementation of these safety features. He also cited an interview with Doug MacLean, then the general manager of the Blue Jackets, and how the organization received angry letters from season ticket holders stating that their view had been ruined by the netting. Wyshynski concluded that "the netting has become such an assumed part of the fan experience that the backlash 10 years ago seems Neanderthalic."

== Legacy ==
After the NHL spent several months studying the environment of the arena and spectator areas which determined that extra safety measures were required to lessen the risk of high-speed pucks entering the spectator areas, league commissioner Gary Bettman ordered the implementation of mandatory safety netting above the protective glass behind and to the sides of both ends of the rink by at least 5 ft (1.5 m) atop the boards in all arenas. The netting has also been implemented by other hockey leagues and organizing bodies globally. A lawsuit brought by Cecil's family against the NHL and the arena was settled out of court for $1.2 million in April 2004. The Brittanie Nichole Cecil Memorial Scholarship Fund has since been created, which collects donations at every Blue Jackets home game.
