= Heaven's Corner =

- Interactive map of Heaven's Corner
- 39.750°N 84.574°W
- Date opened: 1990
- Date closed: May 13, 2015
- Location: West Alexandria, Ohio; United States
- Land area: 10 acres (4.0 ha)
- No. of animals: <150
- Website: www.facebook.com/HeavensCornerZooAnimalSanctuary (No longer available)

Heaven's Corner was a non-profit, USDA-licensed and certified zoo and animal sanctuary located in West Alexandria, Ohio.

The sanctuary was opened in 1990 to serve as a home for abandoned exotic animals. In 1999, it opened to the public, in an attempt to help pay for the costs. The zoo was open to the public during the summer and fall, and appointments and educational tours were also available. In 2008, the zoo finished building a river otter exhibit, and had both a bear habitat and a large cat habitat under construction. In 2015, due to a law passed on exotic animals in Ohio, the zoo was forced to get rid of their felines and other large, carnivorous animals. The zoo officially announced that they were permanently closing on May 13, 2015.
