= Christman Covered Bridge =

- U.S. National Register of Historic Places
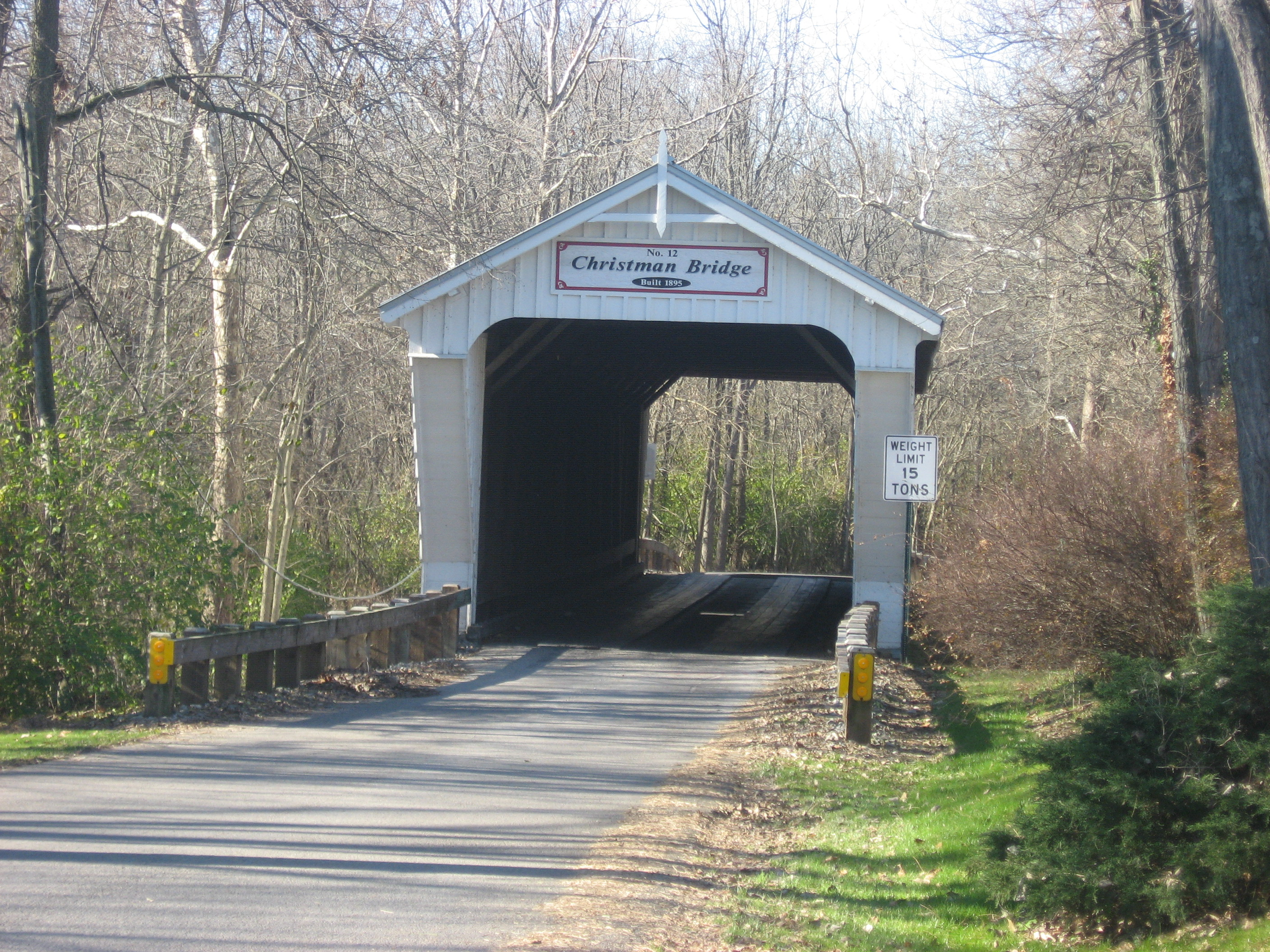
- Eastern portal

- Location within Ohio Location within the United States
- Nearest city: Eaton, Ohio
- Coordinates: 39°46′13″N 84°39′20″W
- Area: Less than 1 acre (0.40 ha)
- Built: 1895
- Built by: Everett S. Sherman
- Architectural style: One-span Childs truss
- NRHP reference No.: 76001516
- Added to NRHP: October 22, 1976

The Christman Covered Bridge is a historic covered bridge that carries Eaton-New Hope Road over Seven Mile Creek in Washington Township, Preble County, Ohio, United States, northwest of the city of Eaton. It was built in 1895 by Everett S. Sherman, who built at least 20 covered bridges in Preble County. It was listed on the National Register of Historic Places in 1976.

The Christman Bridge was built at a total cost of approximately $4,250: $2,452 for stone from the Eaton Stone Company, $1,301 for Sherman, and $499 for masonry work by Harry C. Foster. Rehabilitation work undertaken from 2007 to 2008 cost $331,093.75.

Christman Covered Bridge was the penultimate bridge built by Sherman; only the Warnke Covered Bridge was built later. It was named for a Solomon Christman who owned the land around the bridge and operated a sawmill downstream.

Trace remnants of the mill are visible near the road 200 yards (180 m) west of the bridge. As of 2016, the bridge is open to traffic.
