= Chambers Road Covered Bridge =

- U.S. National Register of Historic Places
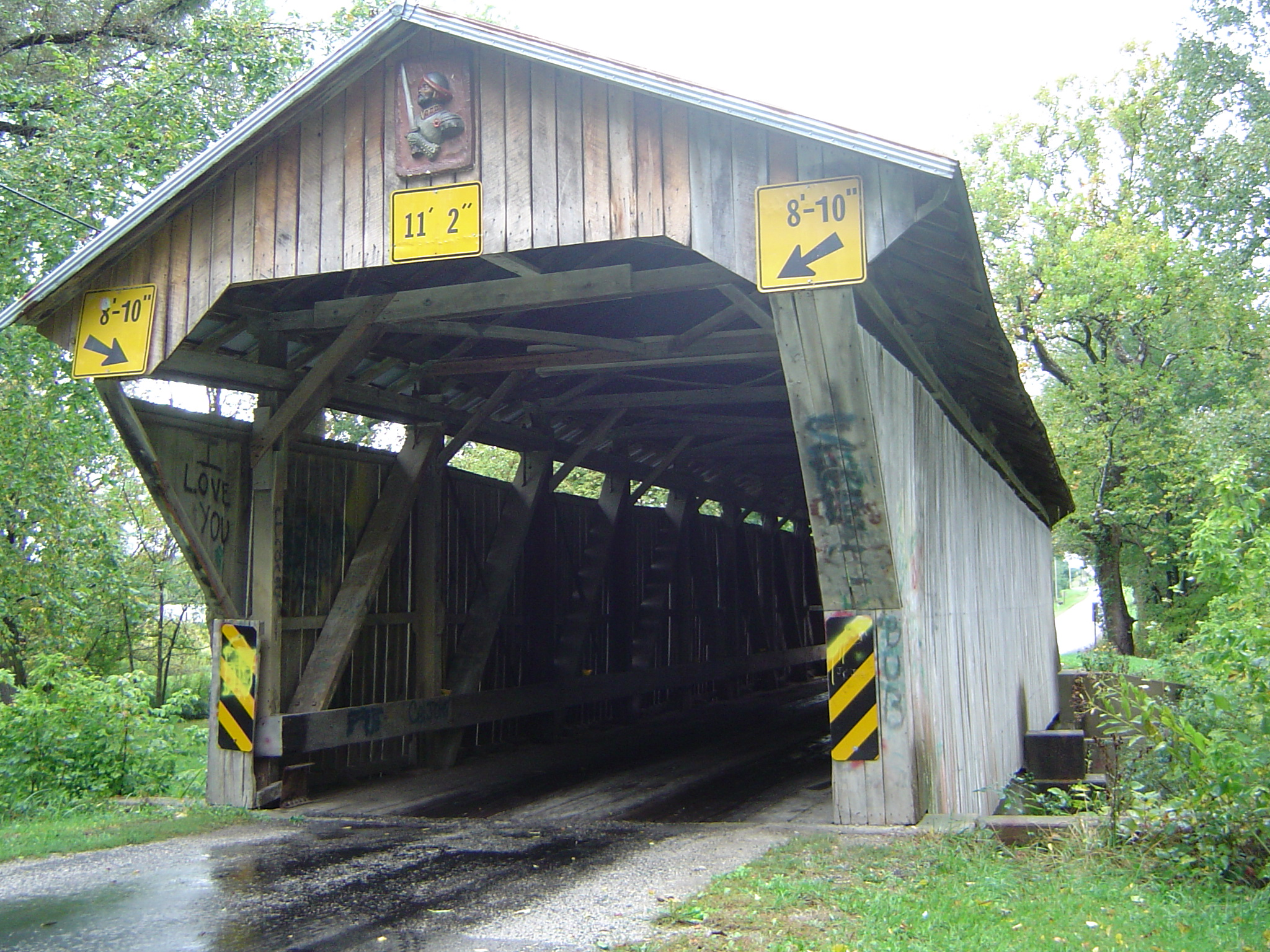

- Location within Ohio Location within the United States
- Nearest city: Olive Green, Ohio
- Coordinates: 40°20′17″N 82°49′5″W
- Area: less than one acre
- Built: 1874
- Built by: Everett S. Sherman
- Architectural style: Childs Truss
- NRHP reference No.: 74001465
- Added to NRHP: November 21, 1974

The Chambers Road Covered Bridge near Olive Green, Ohio was built in 1874 by Everett S. Sherman. It was listed on the National Register of Historic Places in 1974. It is an extremely rare surviving example of a Childs Truss bridge.
