= Acton House =

Historic house in Ohio, United States

- U.S. National Register of Historic Places
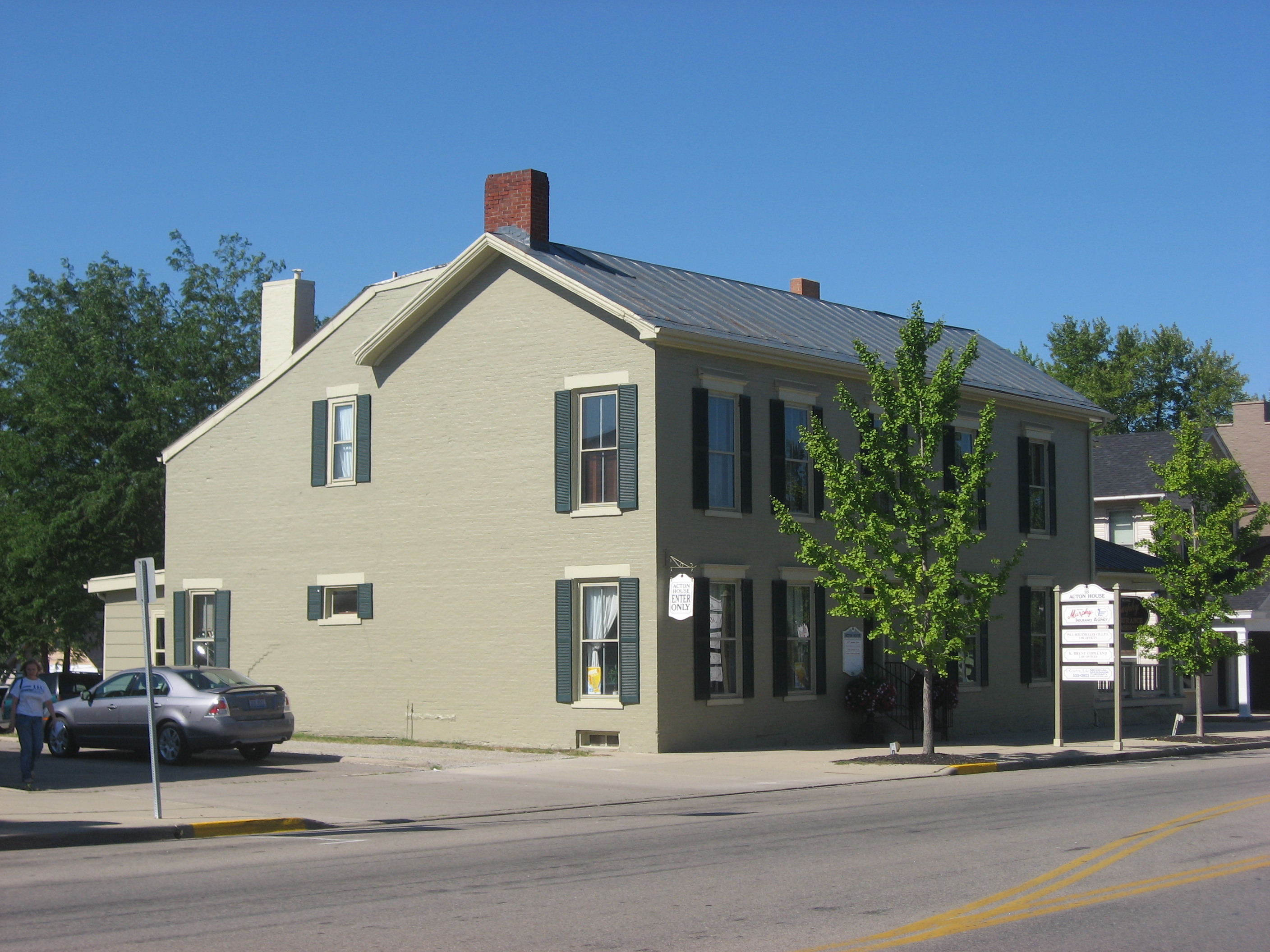

- Location within Ohio Location within the United States
- Interactive map showing the location of Acton House
- Location: 115 W. Main Street, Eaton, Ohio
- Coordinates: 39°44′37″N 84°38′13″W
- Area: Less than 1 acre (0.40 ha)
- Built: 1817
- Architectural style: Italianate and Federal
- NRHP reference No.: 85001944
- Added to NRHP: September 5, 1985

The Acton House is a historic house in located at 115 West Main Street in downtown Eaton, Ohio, United States. It is locally significant for both its architecture and its connection to John Acton.

== Description and history ==
Built in 1817 in a mix of the Federal and Italianate architectural styles, it was built by leading Eaton businessman John P. Acton. From the 1810s until the 1890s, Acton and his family operated four different businesses in the city, including a hattery and a lumber dealership. Moving to Eaton in 1816, Acton built his house in the following year. A two-story building, Acton's house is three bays wide with a small attached hatter's shop. The brick house rests on a foundation of stone; both its roof and various other elements are made of metal. While living in the house, Acton became a local government official; he was a director for the Eaton schools and presided over its school board for multiple years, and he served as one of the judges on the Preble County Court of Common Pleas.

In 1985, the house was listed on the National Register of Historic Places. It is one of four Eaton locations on the Register, along with the site of Fort St. Clair and two bridges. Today, the house serves as an office for local lawyer K. Brent Copeland.
