= Olive Green, Delaware County, Ohio =

Unincorporated community in Ohio, U.S.

Coordinates: 40°19′12″N 82°49′45″W

Olive Green is an unincorporated community in Delaware County, in the U.S. state of Ohio.

== History ==
Olive Green was laid out in 1835. A post office called Olive Green was established in 1845, and remained in operation until 1851. Olive Green later used the Kingston Center post office.

Nearby is the Chambers Road Covered Bridge, a historic site built in 1874.
