= West Alexandria, Ohio =

- Village
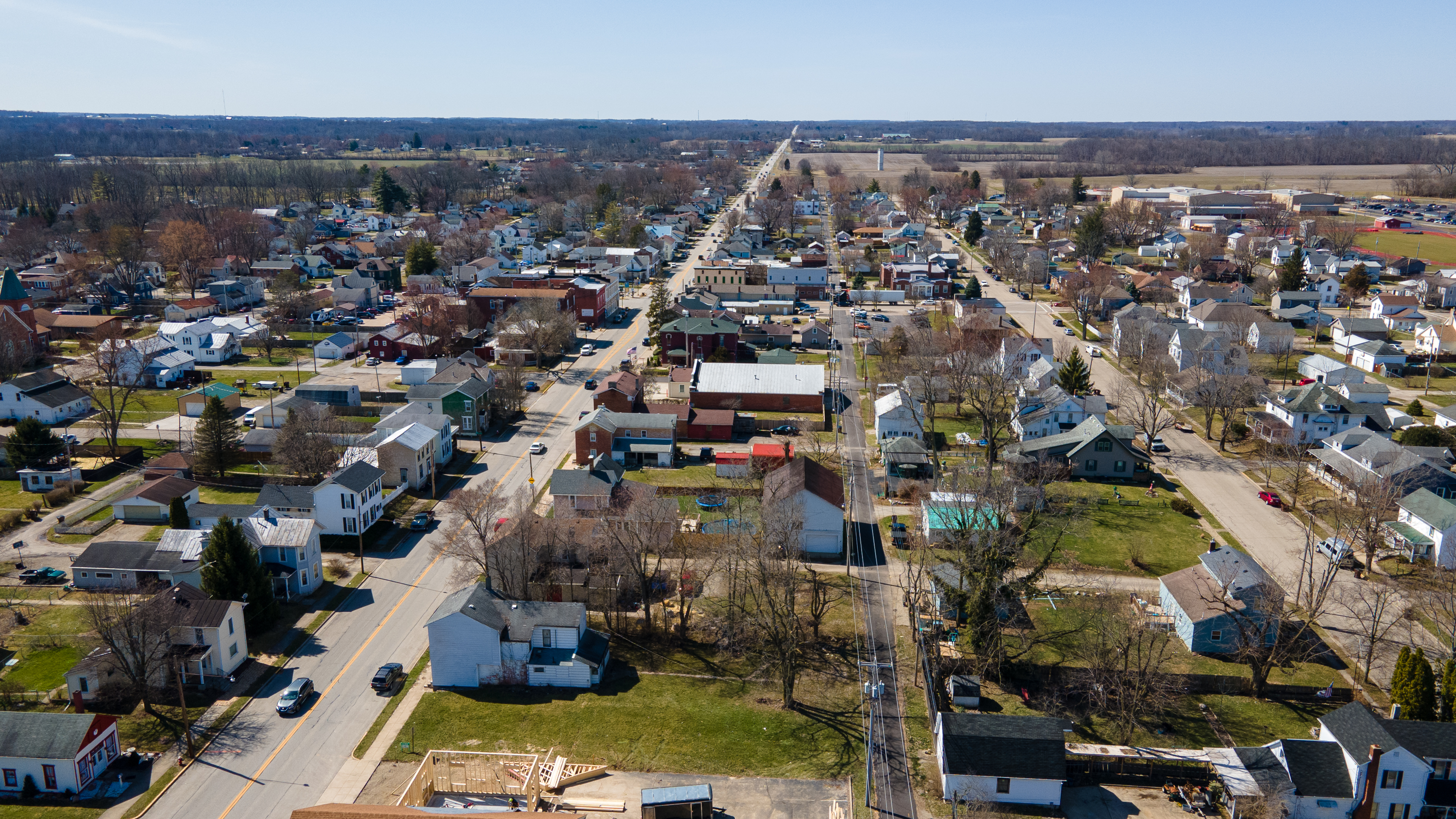
- West Alexandria, 2021

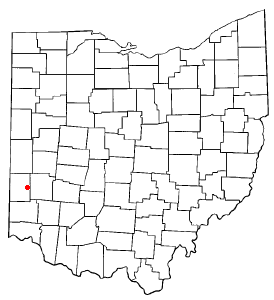
- Location of West Alexandria, Ohio

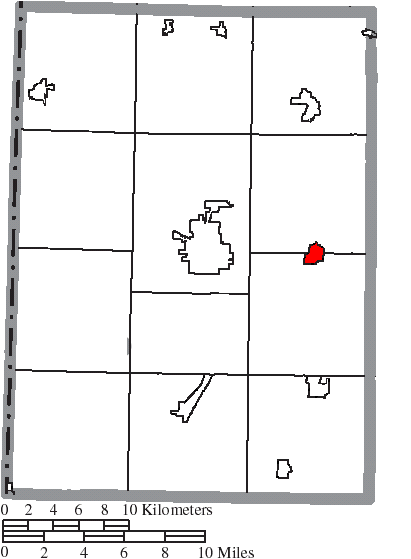
- Location of West Alexandria in Preble County
- Coordinates: 39°44′50″N 84°32′11″W
- Country: United States
- State: Ohio
- County: Preble

Government
  - Mayor: Jeff Hickey

Area
  - Total: 0.86 sq mi (2.24 km^{2})
  - Land: 0.86 sq mi (2.24 km^{2})
  - Water: 0 sq mi (0.00 km^{2})
- Elevation: 896 ft (273 m)

Population (2020)
  - Total: 1,334
  - Density: 1,545.5/sq mi (596.73/km^{2})
- Time zone: UTC-5 (Eastern (EST))
  - Summer (DST): UTC-4 (EDT)
- ZIP code: 45381
- Area codes: 937, 326
- FIPS code: 39-82880
- GNIS feature ID: 2400126
- Website: https://www.westalexoh.com/

West Alexandria is a village in Preble County, Ohio, United States. The population was 1,334 at the 2020 census.

== History ==
West Alexandria was laid out in 1818. The community derives its name from one of its founders, William Alexander. A post office has been in operation at West Alexandria since 1828.

Three buildings in the village have been listed on the National Register of Historic Places: the George B. Unger House, the Lange Hotel, and the West Alexandria Depot.

== Geography ==
According to the United States Census Bureau, the village has a total area of 0.67 square miles (1.74 km^{2}), all land.

== Demographics ==
Historical population
Census	Pop.	Note	%±
1870	455		—
1880	796		74.9%
1890	575		−27.8%
1900	740		28.7%
1910	1,080		45.9%
1920	994		−8.0%
1930	924		−7.0%
1940	993		7.5%
1950	1,183		19.1%
1960	1,524		28.8%
1970	1,553		1.9%
1980	1,313		−15.5%
1990	1,460		11.2%
2000	1,395		−4.5%
2010	1,340		−3.9%
2020	1,334		−0.4%
U.S. Decennial Census

=== 2010 census ===
As of the census of 2010, there were 1,340 people, 551 households, and 371 families living in the village. The population density was 2,000.0 inhabitants per square mile (772.2/km^{2}). There were 611 housing units at an average density of 911.9 per square mile (352.1/km^{2}). The racial makeup of the village was 96.4% White, 1.0% African American, 0.1% Native American, 0.6% Asian, 0.1% from other races, and 1.8% from two or more races. Hispanic or Latino of any race were 1.4% of the population.

There were 551 households, of which 35.0% had children under the age of 18 living with them, 46.5% were married couples living together, 16.5% had a female householder with no husband present, 4.4% had a male householder with no wife present, and 32.7% were non-families. 28.9% of all households were made up of individuals, and 12% had someone living alone who was 65 years of age or older. The average household size was 2.43 and the average family size was 2.96.

The median age in the village was 37.8 years. 25.4% of residents were under the age of 18; 8.9% were between the ages of 18 and 24; 25.8% were from 25 to 44; 25.1% were from 45 to 64; and 14.8% were 65 years of age or older. The gender makeup of the village was 47.7% male and 52.3% female.

=== 2000 census ===
As of the census of 2000, there were 1,395 people, 576 households, and 387 families living in the village. The population density was 1,929.0 inhabitants per square mile (744.8/km^{2}). There were 600 housing units at an average density of 829.7 per square mile (320.3/km^{2}). The racial makeup of the village was 99.07% White, 0.36% African American, 0.14% Native American, 0.14% from other races, and 0.29% from two or more races. Hispanic or Latino of any race were 0.57% of the population.

There were 576 households, out of which 32.3% had children under the age of 18 living with them, 52.1% were married couples living together, 10.6% had a female householder with no husband present, and 32.8% were non-families. 29.7% of all households were made up of individuals, and 13.5% had someone living alone who was 65 years of age or older. The average household size was 2.42 and the average family size was 3.03.

In the village, the population was spread out, with 25.9% under the age of 18, 8.3% from 18 to 24, 30.0% from 25 to 44, 20.4% from 45 to 64, and 15.3% who were 65 years of age or older. The median age was 36 years. For every 100 females there were 98.4 males. For every 100 females age 18 and over, there were 94.0 males.

The median income for a household in the village was $36,399, and the median income for a family was $41,685. Males had a median income of $30,982 versus $24,265 for females. The per capita income for the village was $17,628. About 5.4% of families and 7.4% of the population were below the poverty line, including 9.3% of those under age 18 and 8.8% of those age 65 or over.

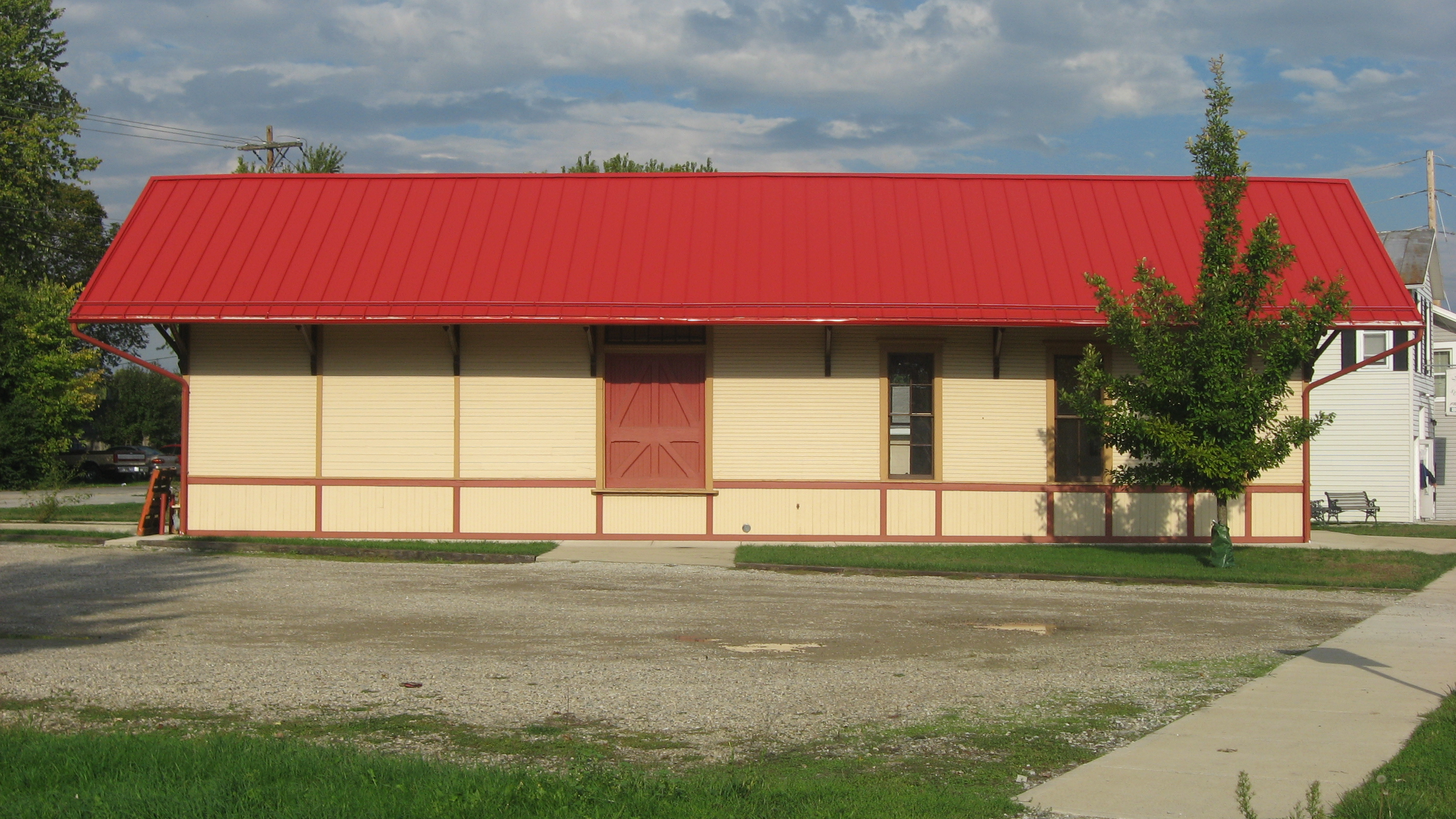
West Alexandria Depot

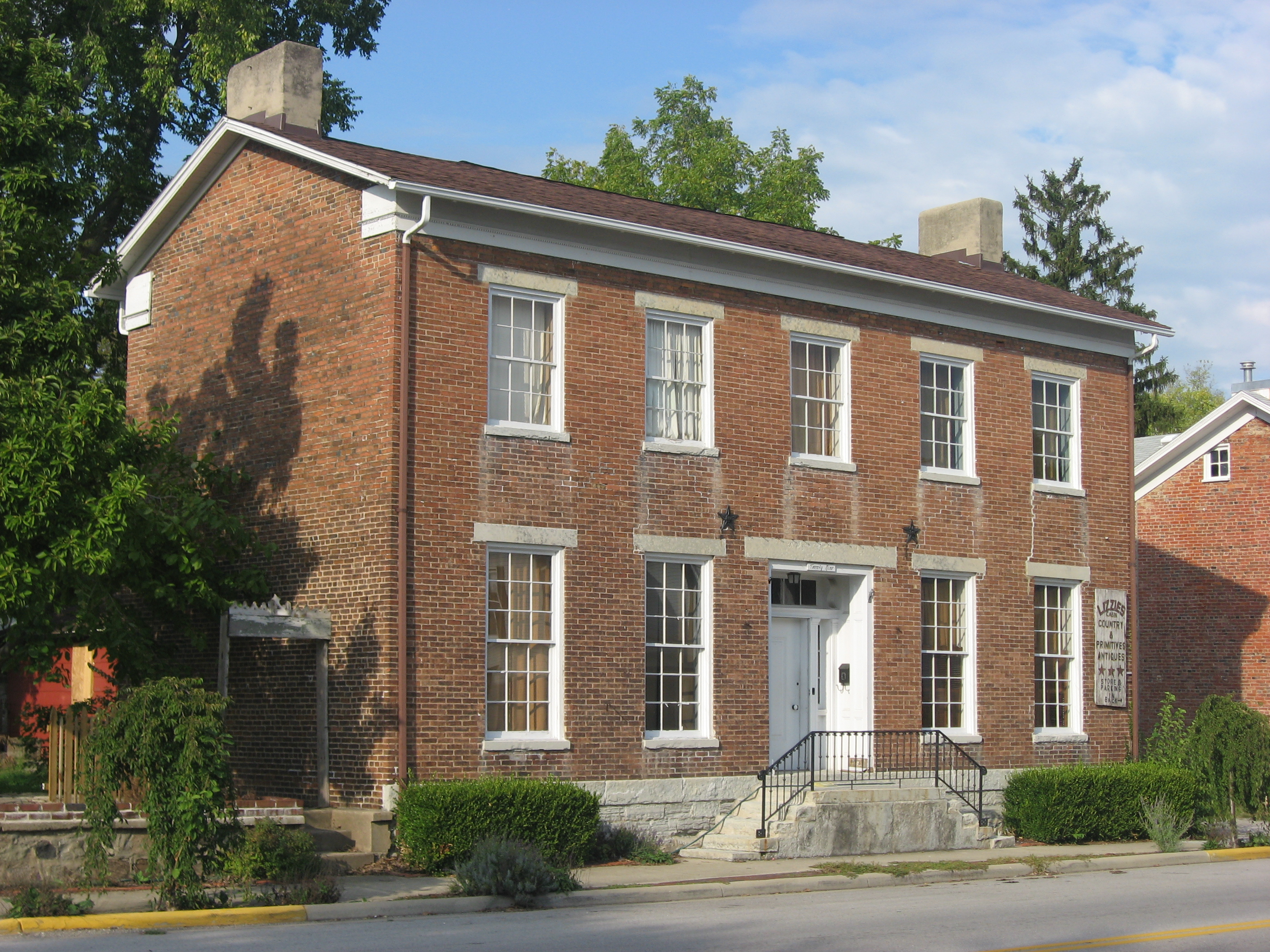
George B. Unger House, a historic site in the village

== Arts and culture ==
The village hosts an Oktoberfest and Peace Park, which includes music, food, crafts, and an antique car show. The village also hosts a Santa's Villa in December at Peace Park.

== Education ==
Twin Valley Community Schools, which covers the city, operates one elementary school, one middle school, and Twin Valley South High School.

West Alexandria has a public library, a branch of the Preble County District Library.

== Notable people ==
- Brittanie Cecil - middle school student and athlete who was killed by errant puck at a Columbus Blue Jackets game
- Rodney Creech - Republican member of the Ohio House of Representatives

== See also ==
- Heaven's Corner - A Zoo and Animal Sanctuary that used to be located in West Alexandria
