= Harshman Covered Bridge =

- U.S. National Register of Historic Places
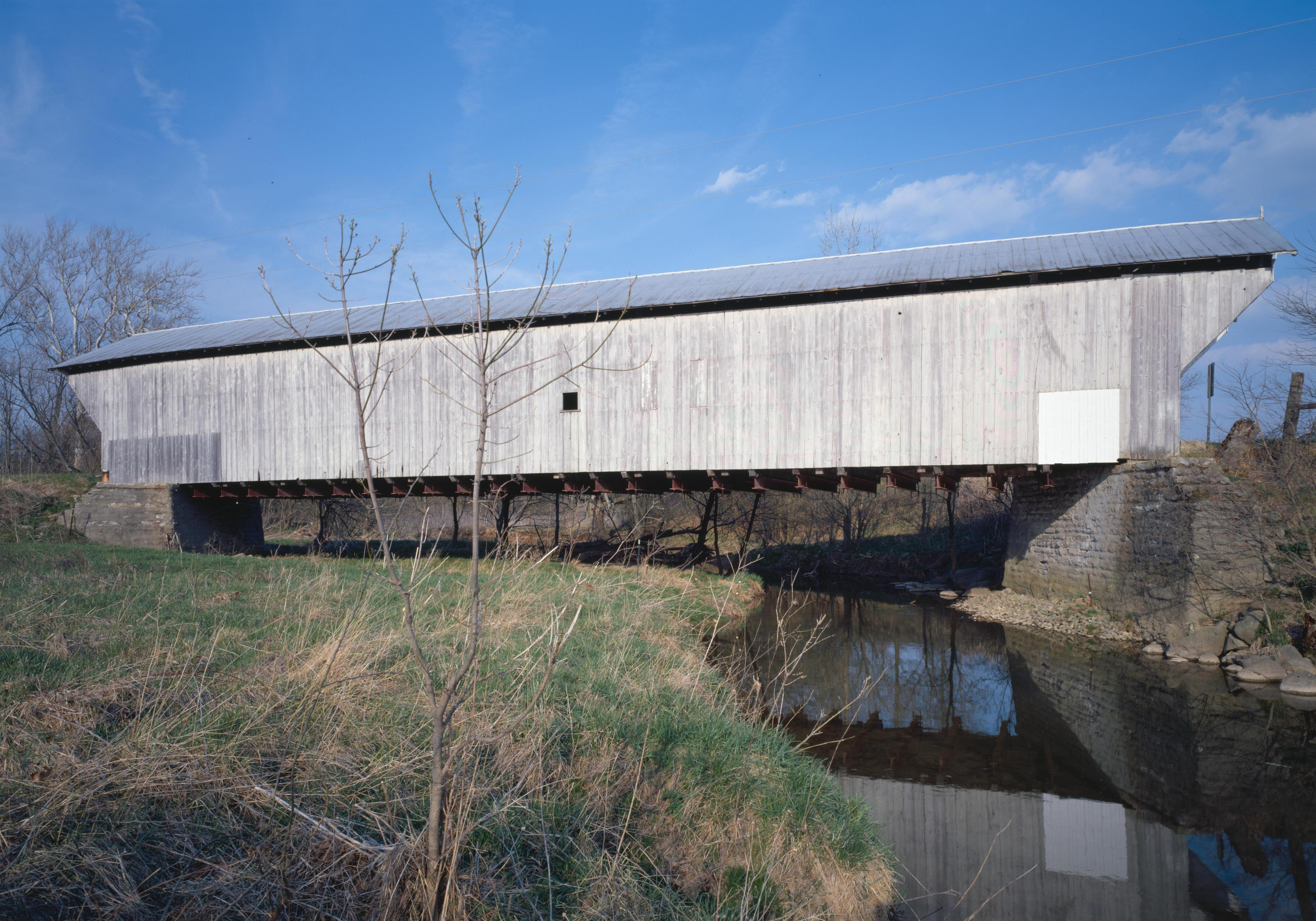

- Location within Ohio Location within the United States
- Nearest city: Fairhaven, Ohio
- Coordinates: 39°42′09″N 84°46′11″W
- Area: less than one acre
- Built: 1894
- Built by: Everett S. Sherman
- Architectural style: One-Span Childs Truss
- NRHP reference No.: 76001517
- Added to NRHP: September 29, 1976

The Harshman Covered Bridge near Fairhaven, Ohio, was built in 1894 by Everett S. Sherman. It was listed on the National Register of Historic Places in 1976. It was documented by the Historic American Engineering Record (HAER) in 2003.

== See also ==
- List of bridges documented by the Historic American Engineering Record in Ohio
