= Warnke Covered Bridge =

- U.S. National Register of Historic Places
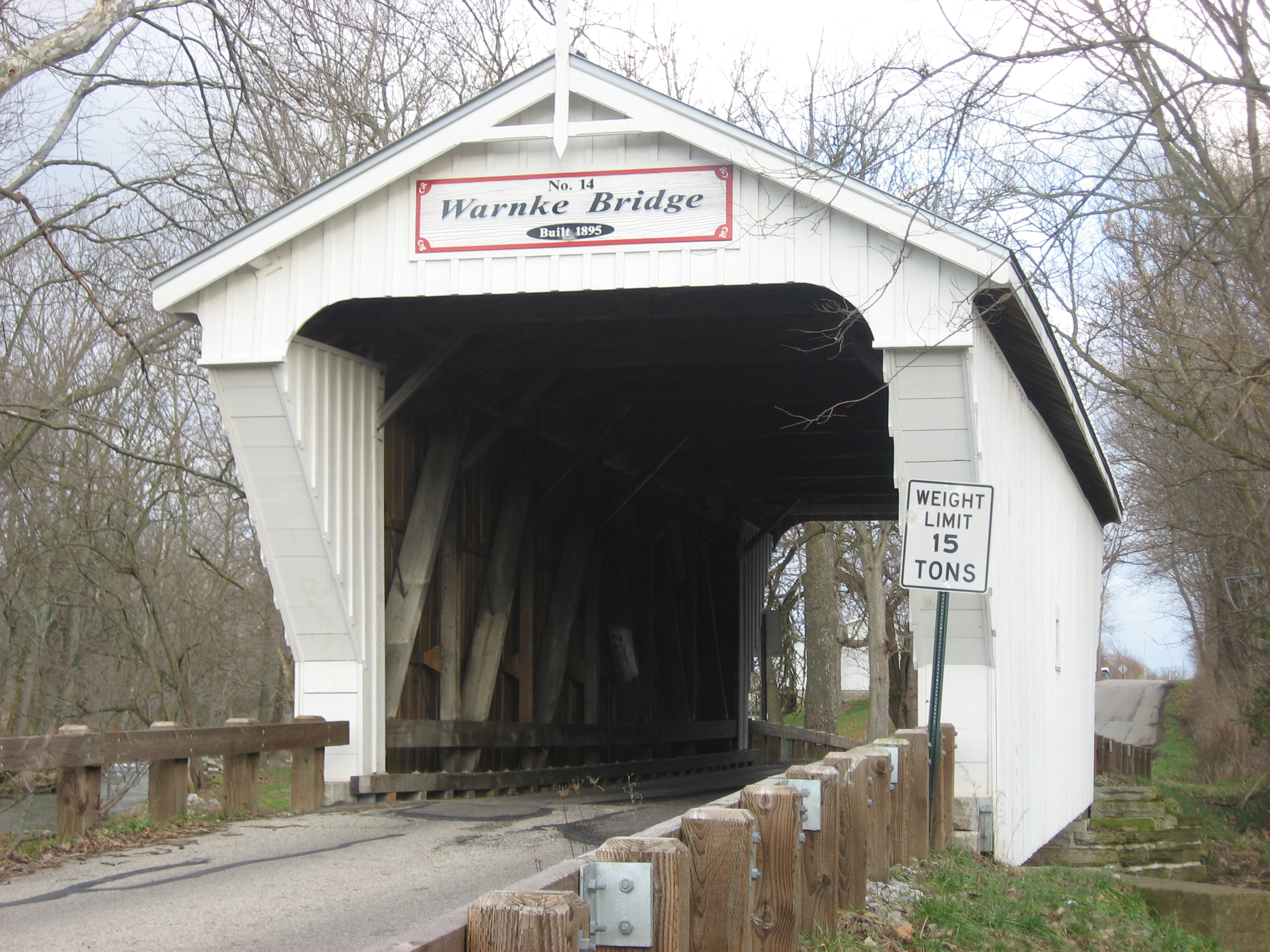

- Location within Ohio Location within the United States
- Nearest city: Lewisburg, Ohio
- Coordinates: 39°52′26″N 84°30′53″W
- Area: less than one acre
- Built: 1895
- Built by: Everett S. Sherman
- Architectural style: One-span Childs truss
- NRHP reference No.: 76001518
- Added to NRHP: October 8, 1976

The Warnke Covered Bridge, also known as Warnke Bridge, is a historic covered bridge crossing Swamp Creek in Harrison Township, Preble County, Ohio, northeast of Lewisburg. Built from 1895 to 1896 by Everett S. Sherman, it has a span of 51 feet. It was listed on the National Register of Historic Places in 1976.

In 1895, a flood damaged the steel truss bridge that had been built at the same location. Sherman built a new "Childs Truss covered Bridge." He purchased the stone for the abutments from the Lewisburg quarry. The bridge was named for a family who lived nearby.

The Warnke Bridge was the last bridge built by Sherman. After the bridge was completed, Sherman moved to Richmond, Indiana, and died shortly thereafter.

The original cost of the bridge was $459. Rehabilitation work undertaken in 2008 cost $240,924.25. At one time, Preble County had 50 covered bridges. Seven of them, including the Warnke Covered Bridge, remain.
