= Lange Hotel =

- U.S. National Register of Historic Places
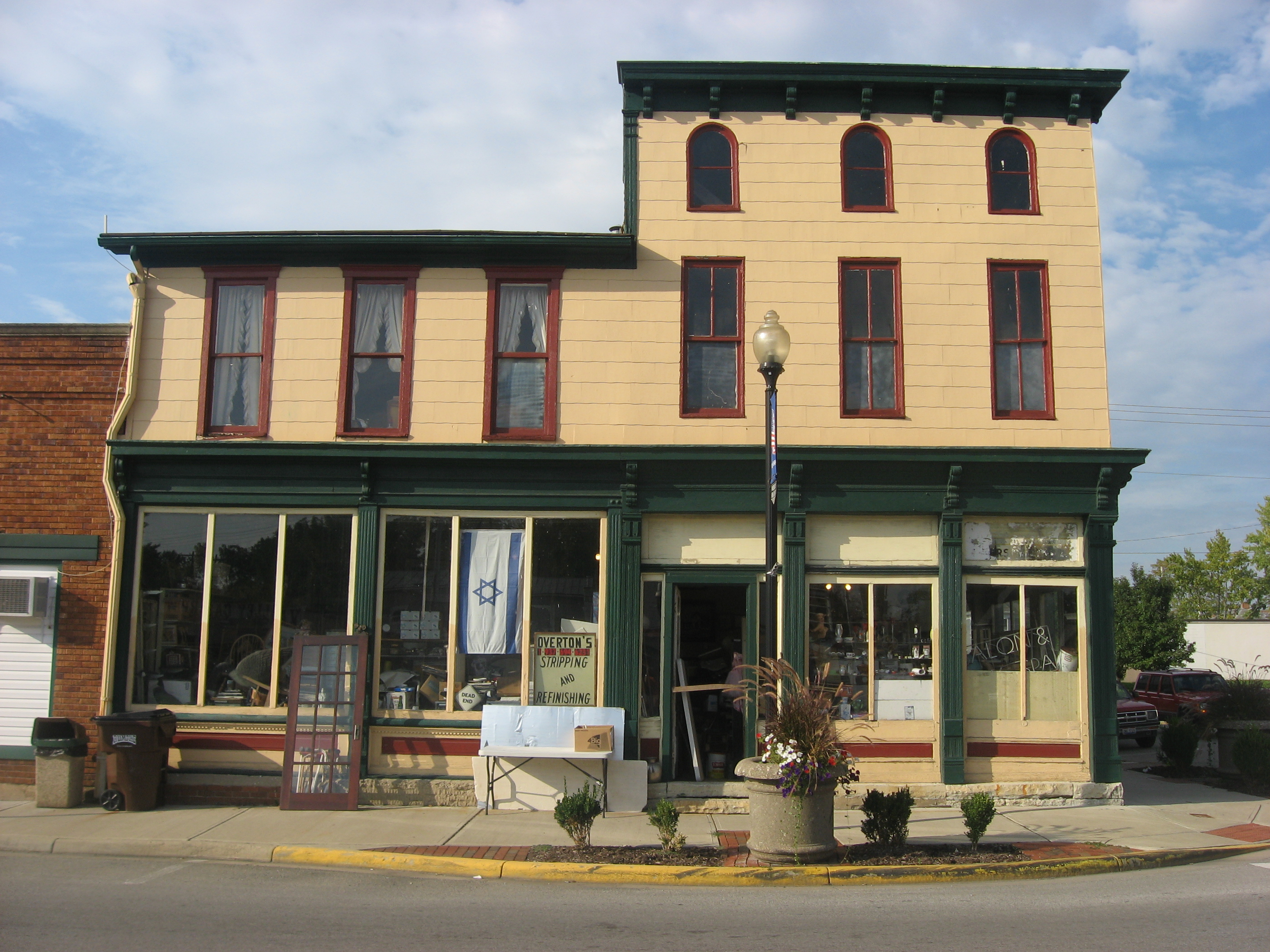
- Front of the former hotel, before it burned down and was demolished

- Location within Ohio Location within the United States
- Location: 1 W. Dayton St., West Alexandria, Ohio
- Coordinates: 39°44′41″N 84°31′57″W
- Area: Less than 1 acre (0.40 ha)
- Built: 1887
- Architectural style: Italianate
- Demolished: October 26, 2025 (after a fire)
- NRHP reference No.: 90002213
- Added to NRHP: January 25, 1991

The Lange Hotel was a historic commercial building and former hotel in the village of West Alexandria, Ohio, United States. One of the area's leading early farmhouses, it was the latest in a series of hotels on the same spot, and it had been designated a historic site. It burned down late on the evening of October 25, 2025, and was demolished the next day.

The portion of Preble County around West Alexandria was first settled between 1800 and 1810, and the village itself was platted in 1818 and incorporated eighteen years later. Just two years after the village was laid out, local resident Valentine Mikesell was granted a hotelier's license for the property where the Lange Hotel stands. Its location was fortuitous for a hotel: the Lange sits at the village's central intersection, along the old road to Dayton to the east. As the years passed, West Alexandria prospered; sawmills and gristmills were established within its limits, and before long it was a commercial center for the surrounding agricultural countryside. A larger lodging facility, the Eagle Hotel, occupied the present site by the 1880s, but it was demolished for the construction of the present building in 1887.

West Alexandria's hilltop site near Twin Creek and its location along a major road made it the junction of multiple important transportation arteries. By the 1880s, a new hotel was needed, and the result was the present frame two-and-a-half-story building with Italianate elements, built on a foundation of limestone. Despite the new construction, there was soon a lack of space, so a two-story wing was constructed on the western side of the original building in 1904.

Today, the hotel's location remains on a busy street — Dayton Street is now U.S. Route 35 — but by the early 1990s, it had ceased to be a hotel and was vacant. Nevertheless, it retained its structural integrity; in January 1991, the hotel was declared historically significant enough and sufficiently well preserved to warrant addition to the National Register of Historic Places, a designation that it officially received on 25 January. Essential to its status as a historic site was its role in the community's history as a transportation center.

Late on the evening of October 25, 2025, reports of a structure fire and heavy smoke brought fire crews to the former hotel. The building, the inside of which had been deemed unsafe by the state fire marshal's office years earlier, started to cave in on itself during the fire. After the fire was put out the remains of the building were completely demolished overnight. During the demolition an excavator fell through into the basement, though no one was injured.
