= Gratis, Ohio =

- Village
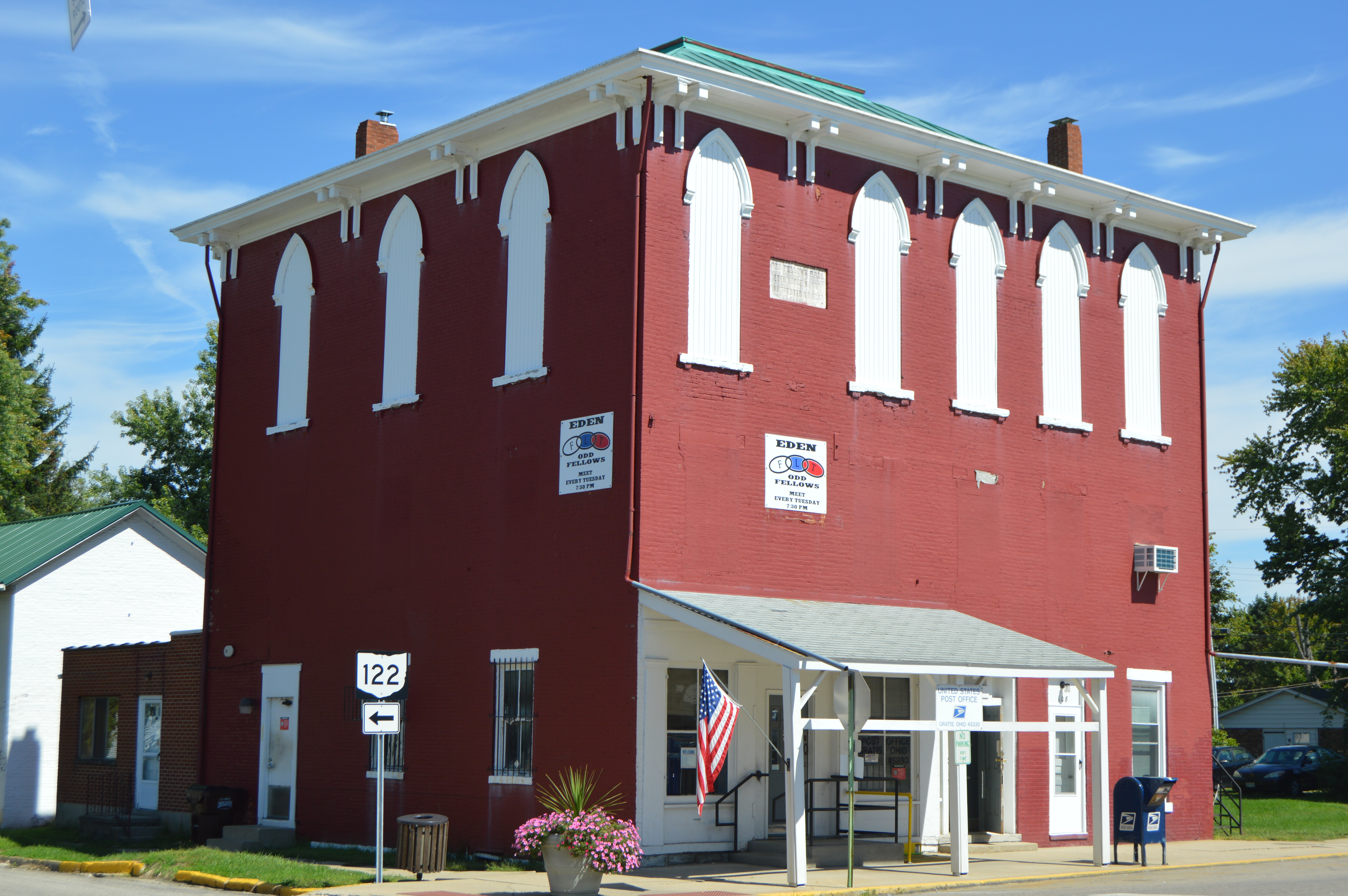
- Post office and IOOF lodge

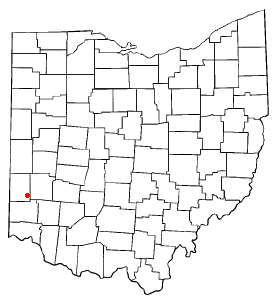
- Location of Gratis, Ohio

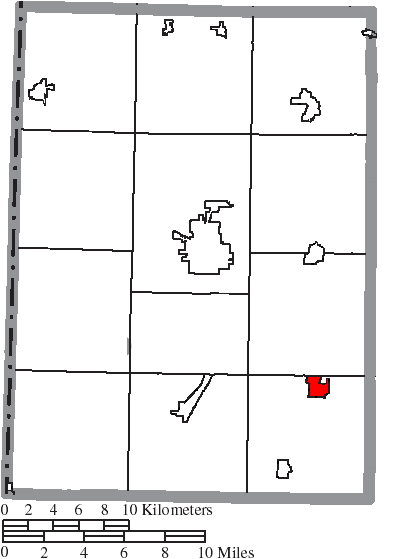
- Location of Gratis in Preble County
- Coordinates: 39°38′54″N 84°31′43″W
- Country: United States
- State: Ohio
- County: Preble

Area
  - Total: 0.97 sq mi (2.52 km^{2})
  - Land: 0.97 sq mi (2.51 km^{2})
  - Water: 0 sq mi (0.00 km^{2})
- Elevation: 873 ft (266 m)

Population (2020)
  - Total: 842
  - Estimate (2023): 831
  - Density: 867.6/sq mi (334.99/km^{2})
- Time zone: UTC-5 (Eastern (EST))
  - Summer (DST): UTC-4 (EDT)
- ZIP code: 45330
- Area codes: 937, 326
- FIPS code: 39-31472
- GNIS feature ID: 2398197
- Website: https://villageofgratis.com/

Gratis is a village in Preble County, Ohio, United States. The population was 842 at the 2020 census. It is part of the Dayton Metropolitan Statistical Area.

== History ==
A post office called Gratis has been in operation since 1823. The village takes its name from Gratis Township.

== Geography ==
According to the United States Census Bureau, the village has a total area of 0.97 square miles (2.51 km^{2}), all land.

== Demographics ==
Historical population
| Census | Pop. | Note | %± |
|---|---|---|---|
| 1860 | 462 | | — |
| 1870 | 430 | | −6.9% |
| 1880 | 502 | | 16.7% |
| 1890 | 389 | | −22.5% |
| 1900 | 375 | | −3.6% |
| 1910 | 410 | | 9.3% |
| 1920 | 372 | | −9.3% |
| 1930 | 365 | | −1.9% |
| 1940 | 435 | | 19.2% |
| 1950 | 575 | | 32.2% |
| 1960 | 586 | | 1.9% |
| 1970 | 621 | | 6.0% |
| 1980 | 809 | | 30.3% |
| 1990 | 998 | | 23.4% |
| 2000 | 934 | | −6.4% |
| 2010 | 881 | | −5.7% |
| 2020 | 842 | | −4.4% |
| 2023 (est.) | 831 | ▼ | −1.3% |
U.S. Decennial Census

=== 2010 census ===
As of the census of 2010, there were 881 people, 337 households, and 251 families living in the village. The population density was 908.2 inhabitants per square mile (350.7/km^{2}). There were 370 housing units at an average density of 381.4 per square mile (147.3/km^{2}). The racial makeup of the village was 97.7% White, 0.5% African American, 0.6% Native American, and 1.2% from two or more races. Hispanic or Latino of any race were 0.3% of the population.

There were 337 households, of which 34.1% had children under the age of 18 living with them, 53.1% were married couples living together, 13.9% had a female householder with no husband present, 7.4% had a male householder with no wife present, and 25.5% were non-families. 22.0% of all households were made up of individuals, and 7.7% had someone living alone who was 65 years of age or older. The average household size was 2.57 and the average family size was 2.96.

The median age in the village was 38.1 years. 23.3% of residents were under the age of 18; 9.5% were between the ages of 18 and 24; 25.5% were from 25 to 44; 29.3% were from 45 to 64; and 12.4% were 65 years of age or older. The gender makeup of the village was 49.7% male and 50.3% female.

=== 2000 census ===
As of the census of 2000, there were 934 people, 349 households, and 255 families living in the village. The population density was 989.2 inhabitants per square mile (381.9/km^{2}). There were 361 housing units at an average density of 382.3 per square mile (147.6/km^{2}). The racial makeup of the village was 99.25% White, 0.11% African American, 0.32% Native American, 0.21% from other races, and 0.11% from two or more races. Hispanic or Latino of any race were 0.54% of the population.

There were 349 households, out of which 39.5% had children under the age of 18 living with them, 60.7% were married couples living together, 8.0% had a female householder with no husband present, and 26.9% were non-families. 23.8% of all households were made up of individuals, and 7.7% had someone living alone who was 65 years of age or older. The average household size was 2.61 and the average family size was 3.11.

In the village, the population was spread out, with 28.3% under the age of 18, 8.0% from 18 to 24, 34.7% from 25 to 44, 18.4% from 45 to 64, and 10.6% who were 65 years of age or older. The median age was 34 years. For every 100 females there were 108.9 males. For every 100 females age 18 and over, there were 102.4 males.

The median income for a household in the village was $36,522, and the median income for a family was $40,938. Males had a median income of $31,477 versus $21,583 for females. The per capita income for the village was $16,304. About 7.3% of families and 11.0% of the population were below the poverty line, including 11.5% of those under age 18 and 5.4% of those age 65 or over.
