= Lewisburg, Ohio =

- Village
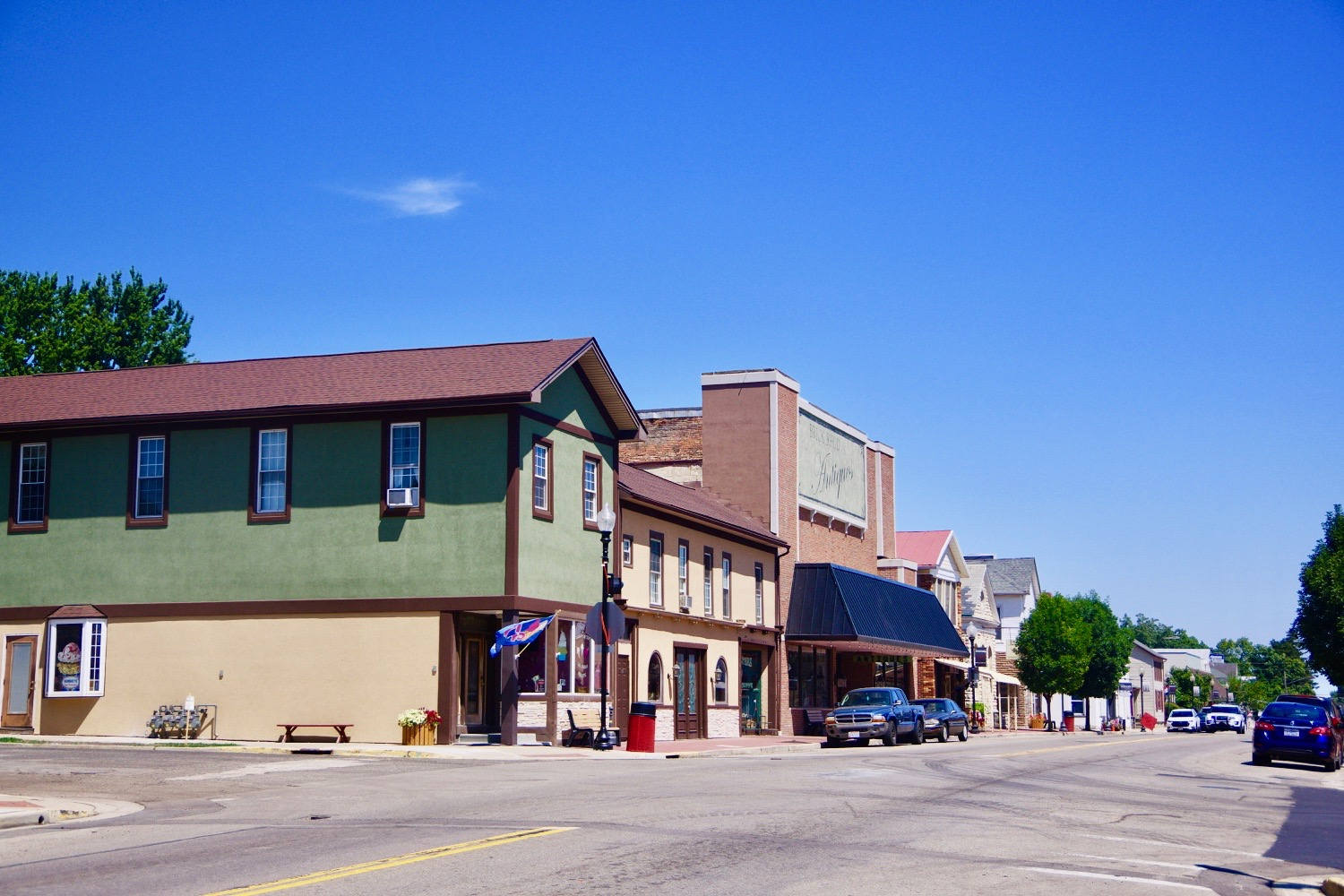
- Commerce Street (SR 503)

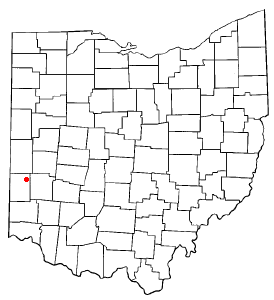
- Location of Lewisburg, Ohio

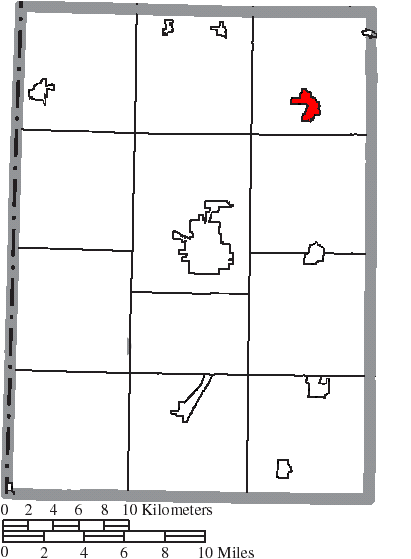
- Location of Lewisburg in Preble County
- Coordinates: 39°51′02″N 84°32′36″W
- Country: United States
- State: Ohio
- County: Preble

Government
  - Type: Council-Manager
  - Municipal Manager: Jeff Sewert
  - Mayor: Patrick Putnam

Area
  - Total: 1.08 sq mi (2.81 km^{2})
  - Land: 1.08 sq mi (2.81 km^{2})
  - Water: 0 sq mi (0.00 km^{2})
- Elevation: 1,014 ft (309 m)

Population (2020)
  - Total: 1,745
  - Density: 1,607.9/sq mi (620.83/km^{2})
- Time zone: UTC-5 (Eastern (EST))
  - Summer (DST): UTC-4 (EDT)
- ZIP code: 45338
- Area codes: 937, 326
- FIPS code: 39-42938
- GNIS feature ID: 2398428
- Website: www.lewisburg.net

Lewisburg is a village in Preble County, Ohio, United States, founded in 1818. The current village incorporates two prior villages, the original Lewisburg and Euphemia, which merged in 1916. The population was 1,745 at the 2020 census. It is part of the Dayton Metropolitan Statistical Area.

== History ==
Lewisburg was founded soon after Harrison Township was organized in 1816.

In 1833, Lewisburg contained one Lutheran church, four stores, two taverns, two physicians, one botanical practitioner, two merchant mills, forty dwelling houses, and about 200 inhabitants.

The community was named for Lewisburg, Virginia (now in West Virginia). In about 1836, pioneer John Mumma founded the community of Euphemia, named for his wife, to the north of Lewisburg on the National Road. The villages officially merged on April 4, 1916, and the combined community retained the name of Lewisburg.

== Geography ==
According to the United States Census Bureau, the village has a total area of 1.07 square miles (2.77 km^{2}), all land.

== Demographics ==
Historical population
Census	Pop.	Note	%±
1850	355		—
1870	391		—
1880	409		4.6%
1890	486		18.8%
1900	560		15.2%
1910	672		20.0%
1920	1,103		64.1%
1930	936		−15.1%
1940	1,126		20.3%
1950	1,230		9.2%
1960	1,415		15.0%
1970	1,553		9.8%
1980	1,450		−6.6%
1990	1,584		9.2%
2000	1,798		13.5%
2010	1,820		1.2%
2020	1,745		−4.1%
U.S. Decennial Census

=== 2010 census ===
As of the census of 2010, there were 1,820 people, 710 households, and 505 families residing in the village. The population density was 1,700.9 inhabitants per square mile (656.7/km^{2}). There were 781 housing units at an average density of 729.9 per square mile (281.8/km^{2}). The racial makeup of the village was 97.1% White, 0.2% African American, 0.3% Native American, 0.5% Asian, and 1.9% from two or more races. Hispanic or Latino of any race were 0.8% of the population.

There were 710 households, of which 36.2% had children under the age of 18 living with them, 52.1% were married couples living together, 13.2% had a female householder with no husband present, 5.8% had a male householder with no wife present, and 28.9% were non-families. 24.4% of all households were made up of individuals, and 11.9% had someone living alone who was 65 years of age or older. The average household size was 2.56 and the average family size was 3.05.

The median age in the village was 36.2 years. 27.3% of residents were under the age of 18; 8.4% were between the ages of 18 and 24; 25.1% were from 25 to 44; 23.7% were from 45 to 64; and 15.4% were 65 years of age or older. The gender makeup of the village was 49.5% male and 50.5% female.

=== 2000 census ===
As of the census of 2000, there were 1,798 people, 678 households, and 503 families residing in the village. The population density was 1,668.6 inhabitants per square mile (644.3/km^{2}). There were 726 housing units at an average density of 673.8 per square mile (260.2/km^{2}). The racial makeup of the village was 98.44% White, 0.06% (1 person) African American, 0.72% (13 people) Native American, 0.56% (10 people) Asian, 0.06% (1 person) from other races, and 0.17% (3 people) from two or more races. Hispanic or Latino of any race accounted for 0.50% of the population (9 people).

There were 678 households, out of which 40.3% had children under the age of 18 living with them, 55.5% were married couples living together, 13.1% had a female householder with no husband present, and 25.8% were non-families. 21.2% of all households were made up of individuals, and 11.8% had someone living alone who was 65 years of age or older. The average household size was 2.65 and the average family size was 3.09.

In the village, the population was spread out, with 30.7% under the age of 18, 7.2% from 18 to 24, 29.6% from 25 to 44, 19.3% from 45 to 64, and 13.2% who were 65 years of age or older. The median age was 33 years. For every 100 females there were 92.1 males. For every 100 females age 18 and over, there were 88.5 males.

The median income for a household in the village was $42,050, and the median income for a family was $47,778. Males had a median income of $34,063 versus $23,696 for females. The per capita income for the village was $18,905. About 6.3% of families and 6.5% of the population were below the poverty line, including 9.2% of those under age 18 and 5.8% of those age 65 or over.

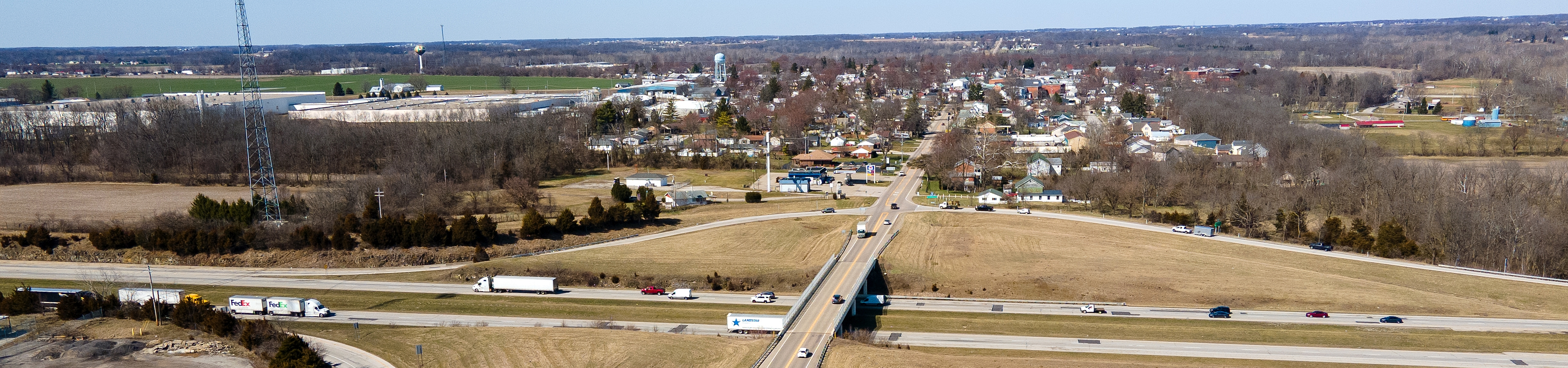
Lewisburg in 2021

== Economy ==
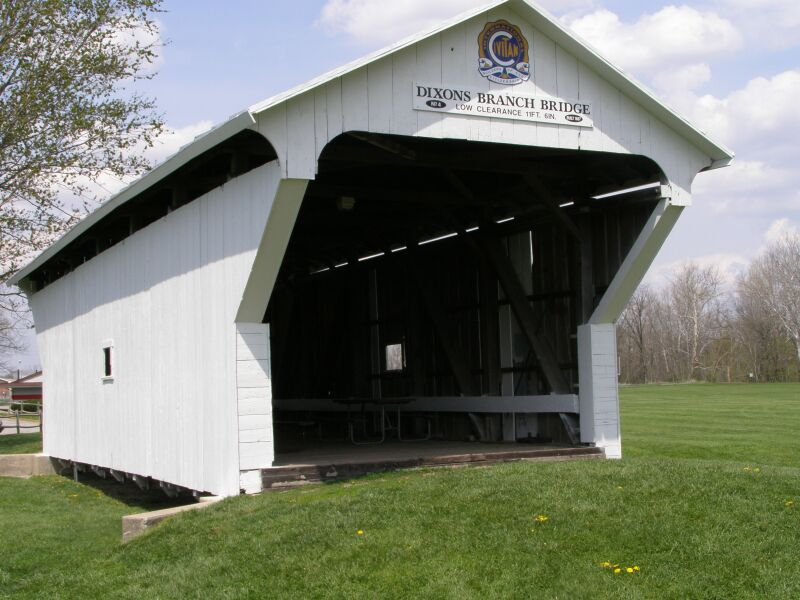
Dixon Branch Bridge in Lewisburg

Major employers in Lewisburg, Ohio, include Cheeseman Trucking, Parker Hannifin Corporation, the Tri-County North School District, the Iams Corporation, which has a manufacturing plant and research center located nearby, Promivi North America Inc., which was previously known as the Carl S. Akey Corporation, and Lewisburg Container.

== Education ==
The school district is Tri-County North Local School District, whose mascot is the panther. According to the Ohio Department of Education Tri-County North received an Excellent rating for the 2010–2011 school year. This rating includes meeting 12 of 12 state indicators.
