= New Haven, Ohio =

New Haven may refer to:

- New Haven, Hamilton County, Ohio, a census-designated place
- New Haven, Huron County, Ohio, a census-designated place
- New Haven Township, Huron County, Ohio

== See also ==
- New Haven (disambiguation)
