= South Haven =

South Haven or Southaven may refer to:

- South Haven, Indiana, U.S.
- South Haven, Kansas, U.S.
- South Haven, Michigan, U.S.
- South Haven Charter Township, Michigan, U.S.
- South Haven, Minnesota, U.S.
- South Haven, New York, U.S.
- Southaven, Mississippi, U.S.
- Southaven, Tennessee, U.S.

== See also ==
- Haven (disambiguation)
- New Haven (disambiguation)
- Newhaven (disambiguation)
- North Haven (disambiguation)
- East Haven (disambiguation)
- West Haven (disambiguation)
- Stonehaven (Scotland)
- Sun Haven (disambiguation)
