= East Haven =

East Haven or Easthaven may refer to:

Places

- East Haven, Angus, Scotland
- East Haven, Connecticut, United States
- East Haven, Vermont, United States

Games

- Easthaven (card game), a variant of the patience or solitaire known as Westcliff
- Easthaven, a place in the role-playing video game Icewind Dale

== See also ==
- Haven (disambiguation)
- New Haven (disambiguation)
- Newhaven (disambiguation)
- West Haven (disambiguation)
- North Haven (disambiguation)
- South Haven (disambiguation)
- Sun Haven (disambiguation)
- Milford Haven
