= West Haven (disambiguation) =

West Haven, Connecticut is a city in the United States.

West Haven or Westhaven may also refer to:

- Westhaven, California (disambiguation)
- West Haven, Oregon, United States
- West Haven, Utah, United States
- West Haven, Vermont, United States
- Westhaven Nunatak, Antarctica

== See also ==
- Haven (disambiguation)
- New Haven (disambiguation)
- East Haven (disambiguation)
- North Haven (disambiguation)
- South Haven (disambiguation)
- Westhaven Marina, Auckland, New Zealand
