= New Baltimore, Ohio =

- Census-designated place
- Location in Hamilton County and the state of Ohio
- Coordinates: 39°16′28″N 84°40′14″W
- Country: United States
- State: Ohio
- County: Hamilton

Area
  - Total: 1.39 sq mi (3.60 km^{2})
  - Land: 1.37 sq mi (3.56 km^{2})
  - Water: 0.015 sq mi (0.04 km^{2})
- Elevation: 627 ft (191 m)

Population (2020)
  - Total: 1,596
  - Density: 1,161.7/sq mi (448.52/km^{2})
- Time zone: UTC-5 (Eastern (EST))
  - Summer (DST): UTC-4 (EDT)
- ZIP code: 45030
- FIPS code: 39-54082
- GNIS feature ID: 2585516

New Baltimore is a census-designated place (CDP) in Crosby Township, Ohio. The population was 1,596 in the 2020 census.

== History ==
The village, about four miles east of New Haven, was laid out in 1819 by mill owner Samuel Pottinger. In July 1863, Morgan's Raiders of the Confederate Army used a ford at New Baltimore to cross the Miami River.

== Geography ==
New Baltimore is situated 17 miles (27 km) northwest of downtown Cincinnati. It lies along the north bank of the Great Miami River.

The CDP has a total area of 1.4 square miles (3.6 km^{2}), all land.

== Demographics ==
As of the census of 2020, there were 1,596 people living in the CDP, for a population density of 1,161.57 people per square mile (448.52/km^{2}). There were 589 housing units. The racial makeup of the CDP was 91.6% White, 2.0% Black or African American, 0.1% Native American, 1.1% Asian, 0.0% Pacific Islander, 0.6% from some other race, and 4.6% from two or more races. 1.9% of the population were Hispanic or Latino of any race.

There were 564 households, out of which 32.4% had children under the age of 18 living with them, 47.5% were married couples living together, 21.5% had a male householder with no spouse present, and 14.0% had a female householder with no spouse present. 25.0% of all households were made up of individuals, and 11.9% were someone living alone who was 65 years of age or older. The average household size was 2.63, and the average family size was 3.00.

20.9% of the CDP's population were under the age of 18, 73.0% were 18 to 64, and 6.1% were 65 years of age or older. The median age was 40.9. For every 100 females, there were 111.8 males.

According to the U.S. Census American Community Survey, for the period 2016-2020 the estimated median annual income for a household in the CDP was $84,903, and the median income for a family was $121,389. About 2.6% of the population were living below the poverty line, including 0.0% of those under age 18 and 0.0% of those age 65 or over. About 82.8% of the population were employed, and 32.1% had a bachelor's degree or higher.
