= Whitewater Shaker Settlement =

- U.S. National Register of Historic Places
- U.S. Historic district
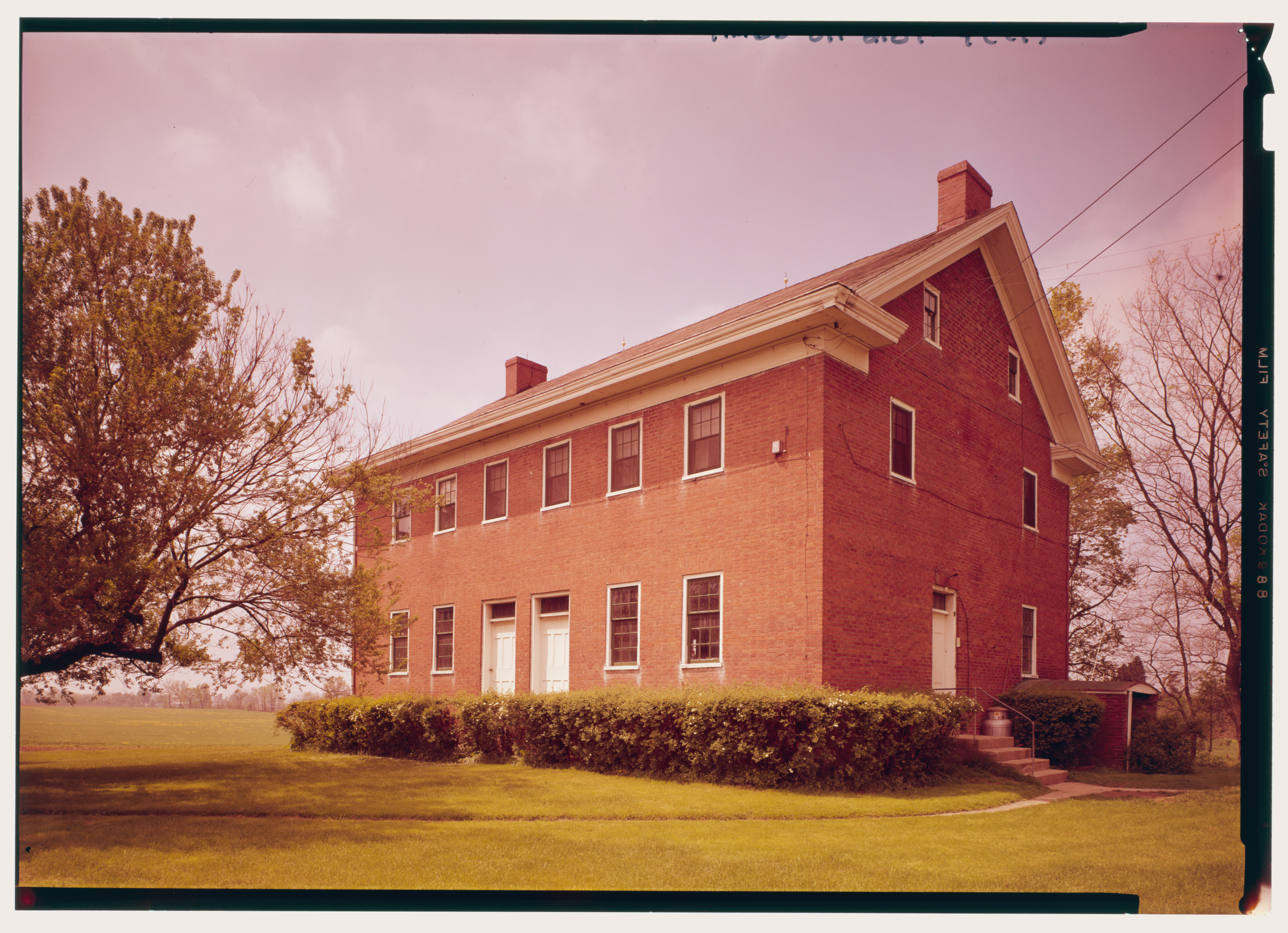
- Meeting House at the North Family of White Water Shaker Village

- Location within Ohio Location within the United States
- Location: 11813 Oxford Rd. Harrison, Ohio 45030
- Nearest city: New Haven, Ohio
- Coordinates: 39°17′40″N 84°44′34″W
- Area: 384 acres (155 ha)
- NRHP reference No.: 74001518
- Added to NRHP: January 21, 1974

The Whitewater Shaker Settlement (also known as White Water Shaker Village) is a former Shaker settlement near New Haven in Crosby Township, Ohio, United States. Established in 1824 and closed in 1916, it was listed on the National Register of Historic Places in 1974 as a historic district.

== History ==
The origins of White Water trace back to a small group of settlers in southern Butler County, Ohio, who gathered together as Shakers in 1822, possibly earlier. In 1823, the members of three prominent Butler County families joined, and this community (which had no formal name) moved to a larger farm. Undoubtedly at the urging of an early convert, Miriam Agnew, the Union Village ministry increased its spiritual and material support for White Water, culminating in the first purchase of land for White Water by Union Village trustees in 1824. The newly gathered Believers were joined in 1824 by the Darby Plain Shakers, whose former New Light and Farnhamite preacher, Nathan Burlingame, was the first to arrive at White Water from that abandoned central Ohio community.

The first years were difficult because their few acres were forested and poor for farming. Noting the deprivations of the group, Calvin Morrell wrote later at Union Village, "It was Lent with them nearly all year round." In 1825, however, the Shakers were able to purchase 215 acres (0.87 km^{2}) of good land for a mill seat on the Dry Fork of the Whitewater River, and the new community moved again to the site of the White Water North Family. Union Village brethren arrived in 1826 to help establish the family. The brick Meeting House was completed in 1827, the same year that the Shakers' sawmill on the Dry Fork commenced operations. That year membership swelled when West Union was dissolved. In 1835 there were 42 females and 35 males, including children, in spite of defections during years just past. During this time the White Water Shakers established a cemetery located between the South and Center Families. The upkeep and maintenance of the cemetery is now the responsibility of Crosby Township.

Another group that added to the ranks of the White Water Shakers were followers of William Miller. He predicted the exact moment in April 1844 for Christ's Second Coming. People wound up their earthly affairs, dressed in ascension robes, and waited. Miller set another date six months later, but that final judgment day passed, too. His disappointed followers, the Millerites or Second Adventists, were courted by the Shakers who convinced the Millerites that the Shakers had already experienced the Second Coming in a spiritual sense.

At its peak with the conversion of the Millerites in 1846, White Water village comprised 706 acres (2.86 km^{2}) in Hamilton County and 190 acres (0.77 km^{2}) in Butler County on which 200 believers in two families worked the large farm and engaged in a variety of industries. The Shakers would purchase additional land and establish a third family in the 1850s, and they remained a vibrant community into the 1880s when the long, slow decline began. The White Water Shakers operated a grist mill, sawmill, and possibly a brewery. They raised broom corn and manufactured brooms, sold packaged garden seeds (grossing $5,704 in 1857), and maintained large apple orchards for the sale of applesauce and cider. Other industries included sorghum molasses, honey, and preserved currents, grapes, and strawberries. The Shakers also raised silkworms for the manufacture of their own shawls, scarves, and handkerchiefs. In the final years of the community, the Believers were well known for raising fish in two Shaker-made ponds and for selling turkey eggs.

The Civil War affected the White Water Shaker community. In April 1863, Morgan's Raiders passed through the community. Because a mill worker warned the rest of the community of the approach of the Raiders and the Shakers quickly hid their horses, only two horses were stolen. However, pursuing Union cavalrymen troops arrived on the following day, and they too took horses.

After 30 years of decline and a change in leadership, in 1911 the Union Village ministry decided to lease the South, Center, and North Family farms. The remaining Shakers resided in the Office until 1916, when the farms were sold. Land owned by the community over its 94 years of existence included 1,128 acres (4.56 km^{2}) in Hamilton County, 664 acres (2.69 km^{2}) in Butler County, and 972 acres (3.93 km^{2}) in Clinton County – totaling 2,764 acres (11.19 km^{2}). December 4, 1916, marked the final land sale and the departure of Elder Andrew Barrett and Eldress Mary Gass. Elder Barrett went to Hancock, the Shaker community near Pittsfield, Massachusetts. Eldress Mary Gass went to Mount Lebanon, New York, the leading Shaker community in the East. While the South and Center farms remained in agricultural use, the North Family land was subsequently divided and the brick Meeting House and Dwelling House passed to separate owners.

In 1991, the Great Parks of Hamilton County District purchased much of the remaining White Water buildings and land. The Park District owns 23 original Shaker-built or Shaker-used structures, including the 1827 two-story meetinghouse (the only extant brick Shaker meetinghouse), the 1832-33 North Family dwelling, a brick Trustee's Office with its 1855 date stone, a brick shop, a frame broom shop, and numerous barns and farm outbuildings. In all, this is the largest collection of Shaker building in Ohio and represents one of the most intact of all the Shaker villages. The North Family is now operated by the Friends of White Water Shaker Village Nonprofit, after taking control of the North Family's eight acres and ten historic buildings through a long term lease with the Great Parks of Hamilton County in 2007. The Friends of White Water Shaker Village are actively involved in restoration and preservation projects at White Water Shaker Village. They also occasionally offer public tours of the North Family Meeting House and Dwelling throughout the year.

== Images ==
Historical images of White Water Shaker Village

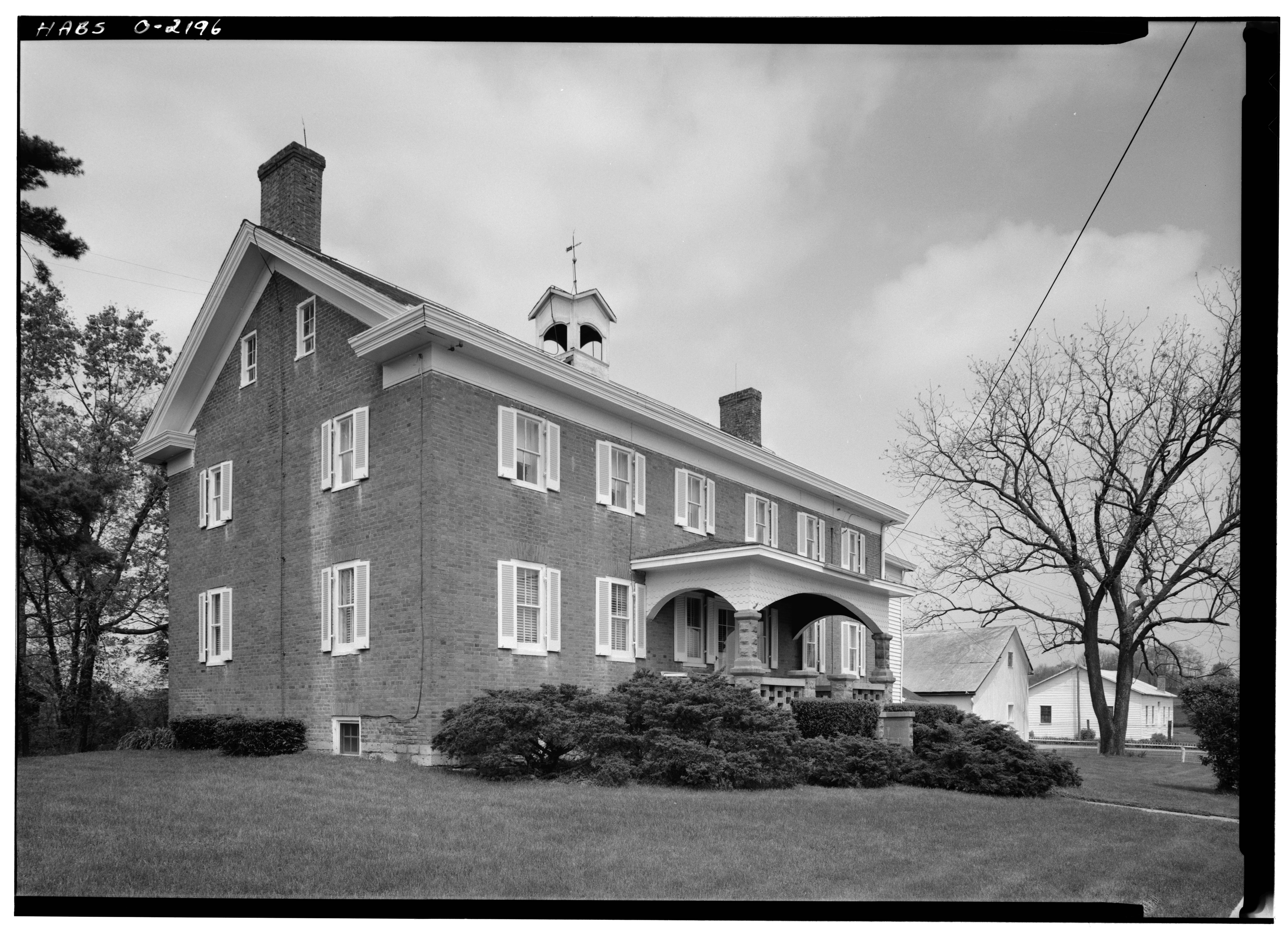
File:Historic_American_Buildings_Survey,_May,_1974_VIEW_FROM_SOUTHEAST._-_Shaker_North_Family,_Dwelling_House,_Oxford_Road,_White_Water_Park,_Hamilton_County,_OH_HABS_OHIO,31-WHIT,5-1.tif

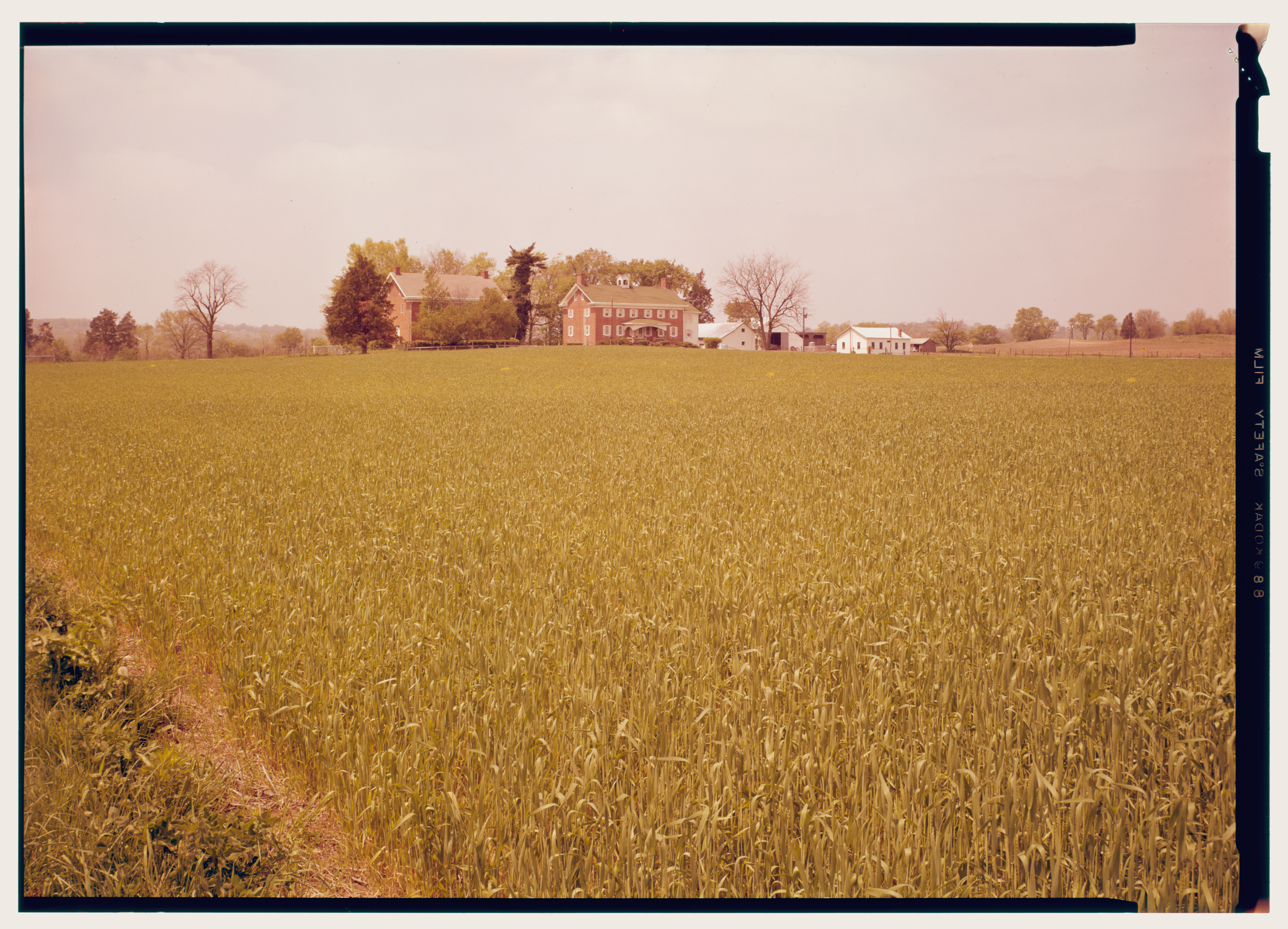
File:GENERAL_VIEW_ACROSS_FARM_FIELD_FROM_SOUTHEAST_(Duplicate_of_HABS_OH-2197-1)_-_Shaker_North_Family,_General_View,_Oxford_Road,_White_Water_Park,_Hamilton_County,_OH_HABS_OHIO,31-WHIT,6-2_(CT).tif

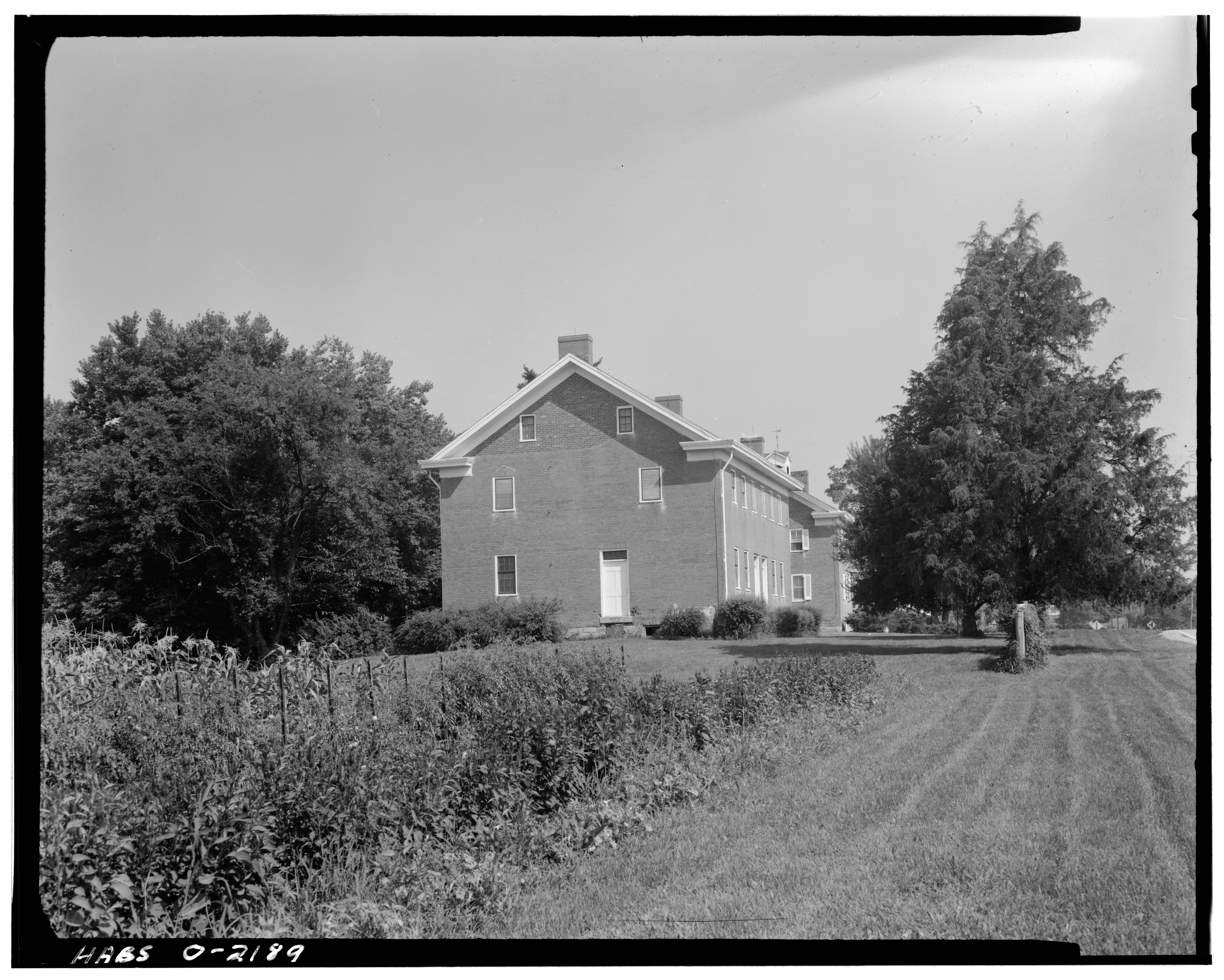
File:Historic_American_Buildings_Survey,_Elmer_R._Pearson,_Photographer,_1968_SIDE_AND_FRONT_ELEVATIONS._-_Shaker_Meetinghouse,_Oxford_Road,_White_Water_Park,_Hamilton_County,_OH_HABS_OHIO,31-WHIT,4-3.tif

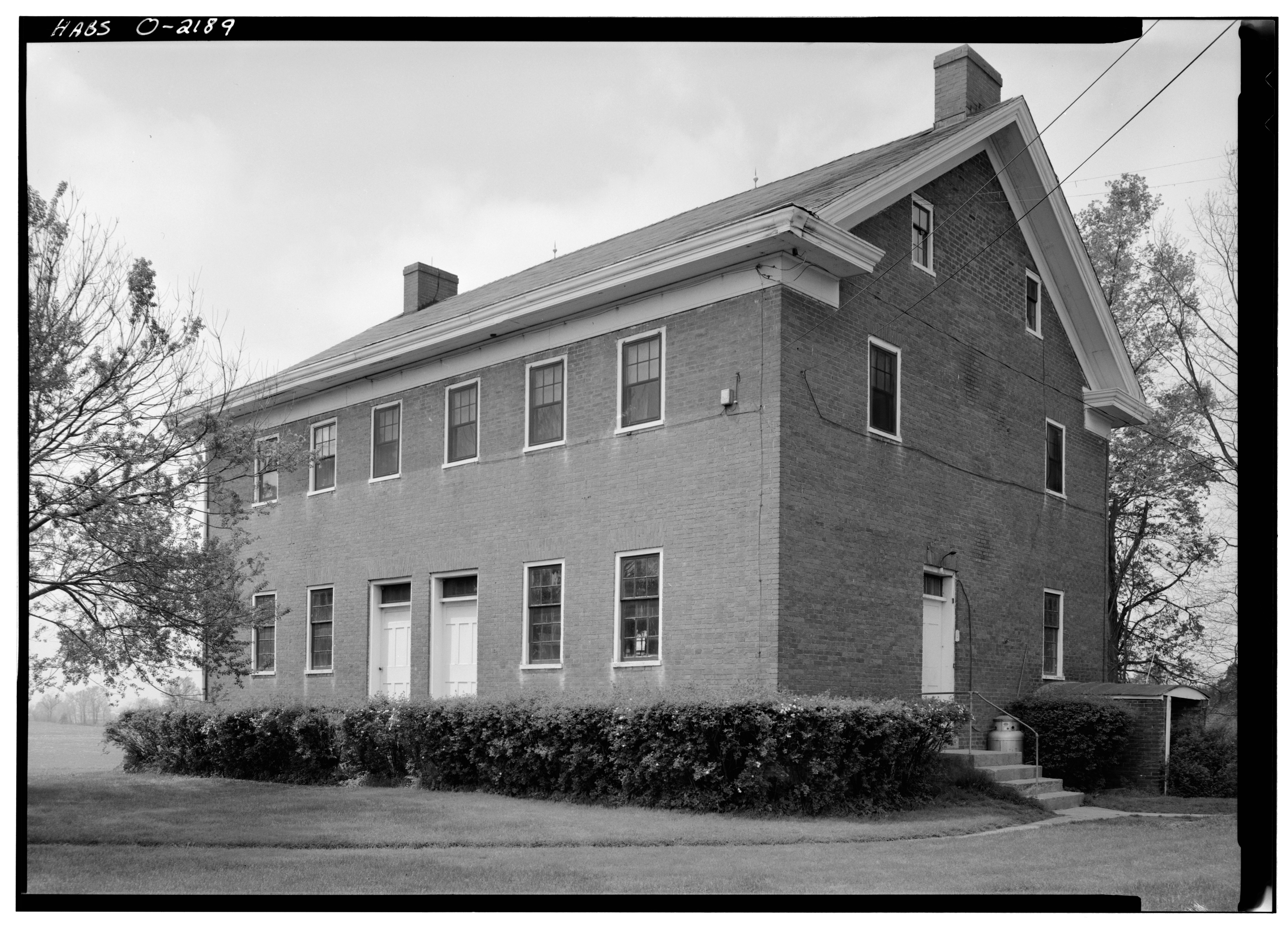
File:Historic_American_Buildings_Survey,_May,_1974_ELEVATION_FROM_NORTHEAST._-_Shaker_Meetinghouse,_Oxford_Road,_White_Water_Park,_Hamilton_County,_OH_HABS_OHIO,31-WHIT,4-2.tif

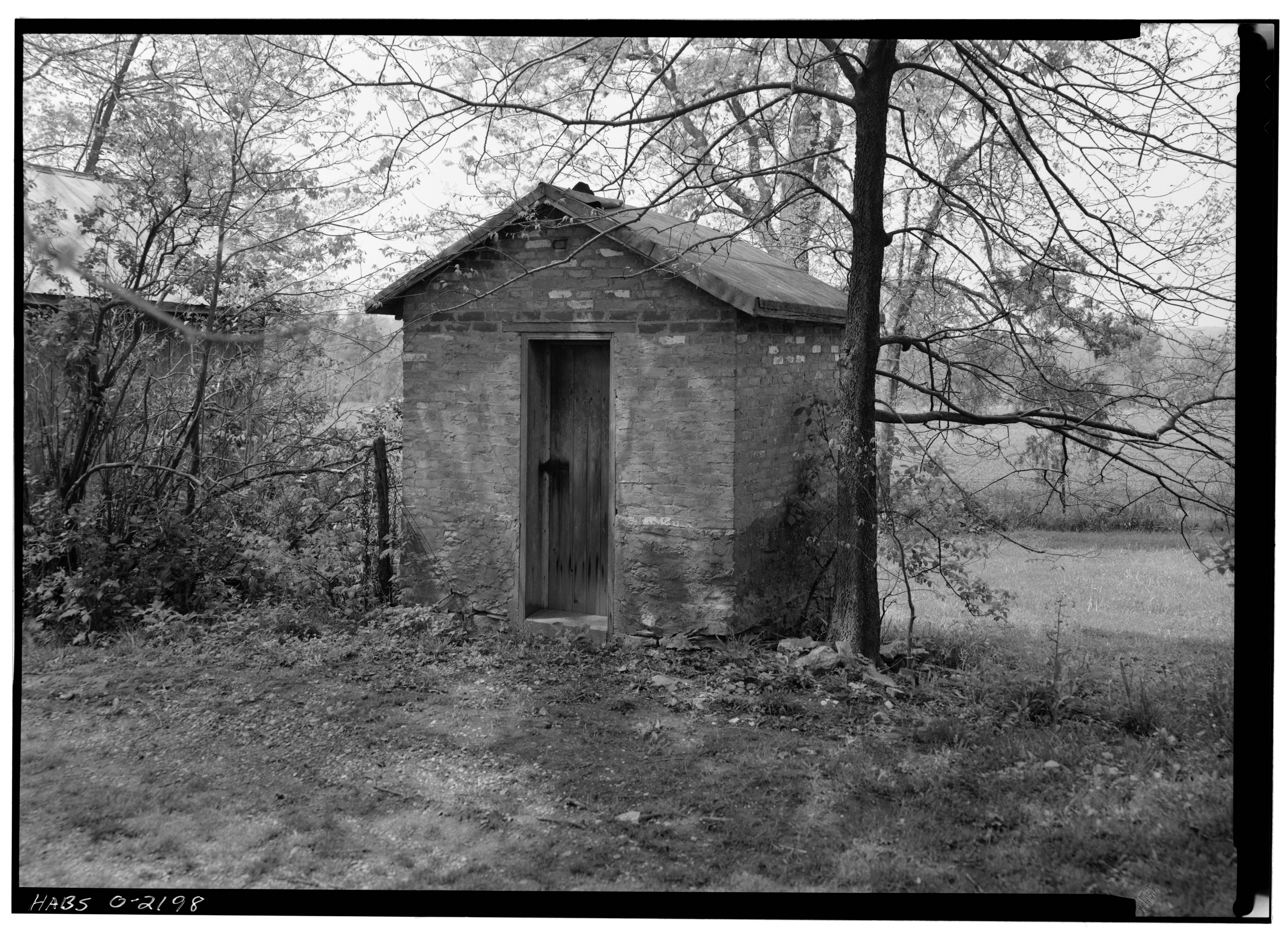
File:Historic_American_Buildings_Survey,_May,_1974_VIEW_FROM_NORTHEAST._-_Shaker_North_Family,_Smokehouse,_Oxford_Road,_White_Water_Park,_Hamilton_County,_OH_HABS_OHIO,31-WHIT,9-1.tif

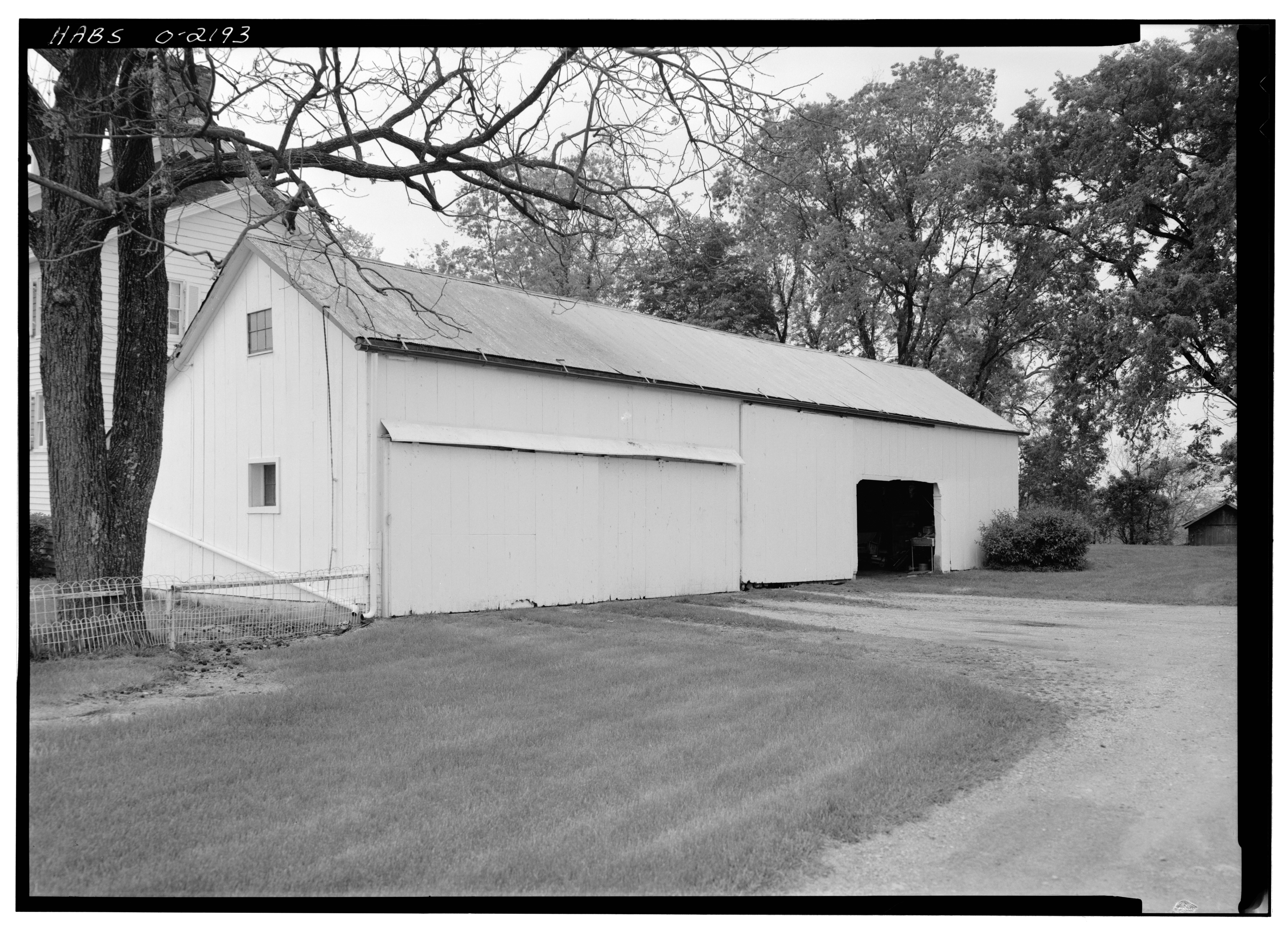
File:Historic_American_Buildings_Survey,_May,_1974_VIEW_FROM_NORTHEAST._-_Shaker_North_Family,_Woodshed,_Oxford_Road,_White_Water_Park,_Hamilton_County,_OH_HABS_OHIO,31-WHIT,10-1.tif

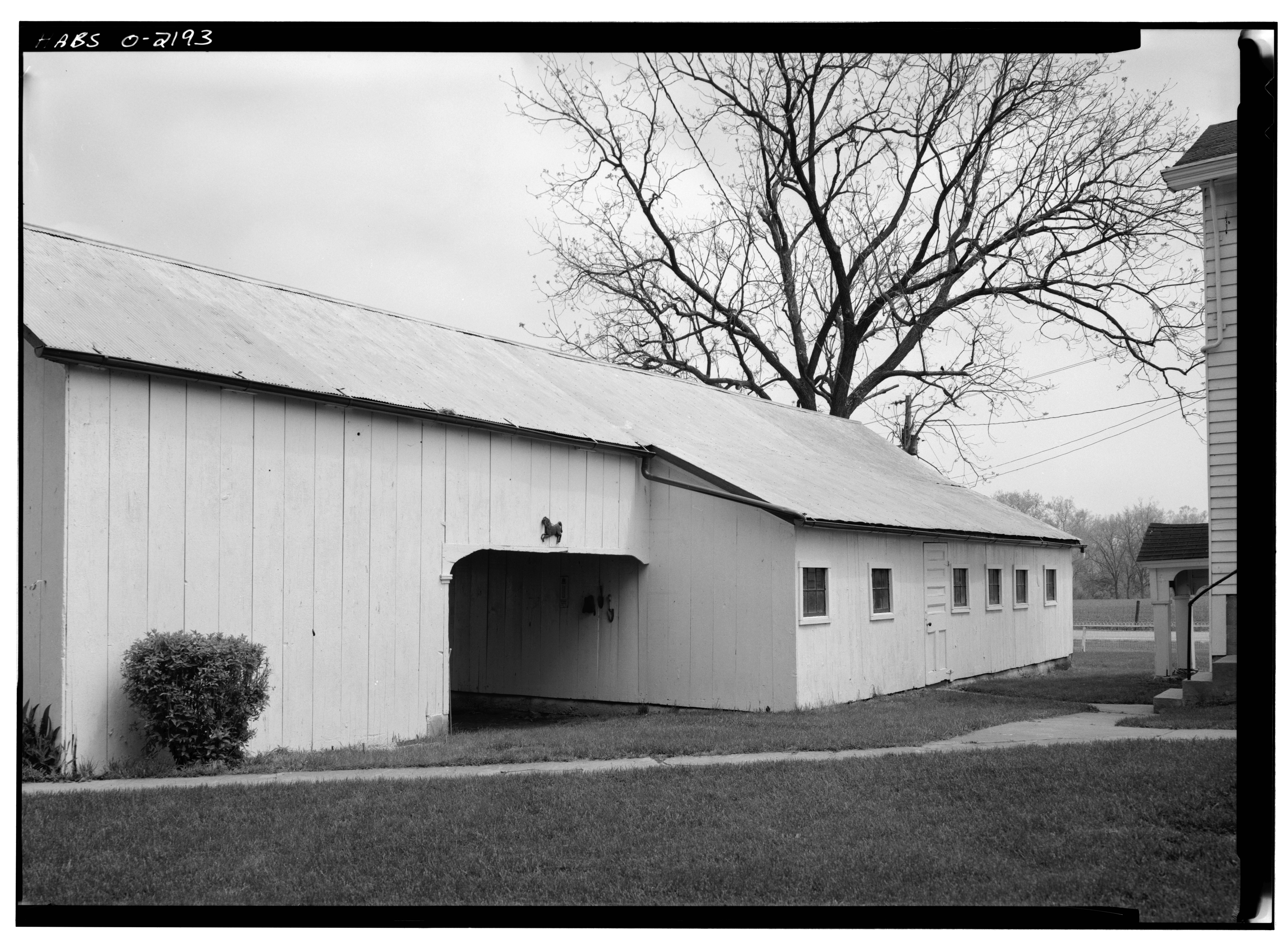
File:Historic_American_Buildings_Survey,_May,_1974_VIEW_FROM_NORTHWEST._-_Shaker_North_Family,_Woodshed,_Oxford_Road,_White_Water_Park,_Hamilton_County,_OH_HABS_OHIO,31-WHIT,10-2.tif

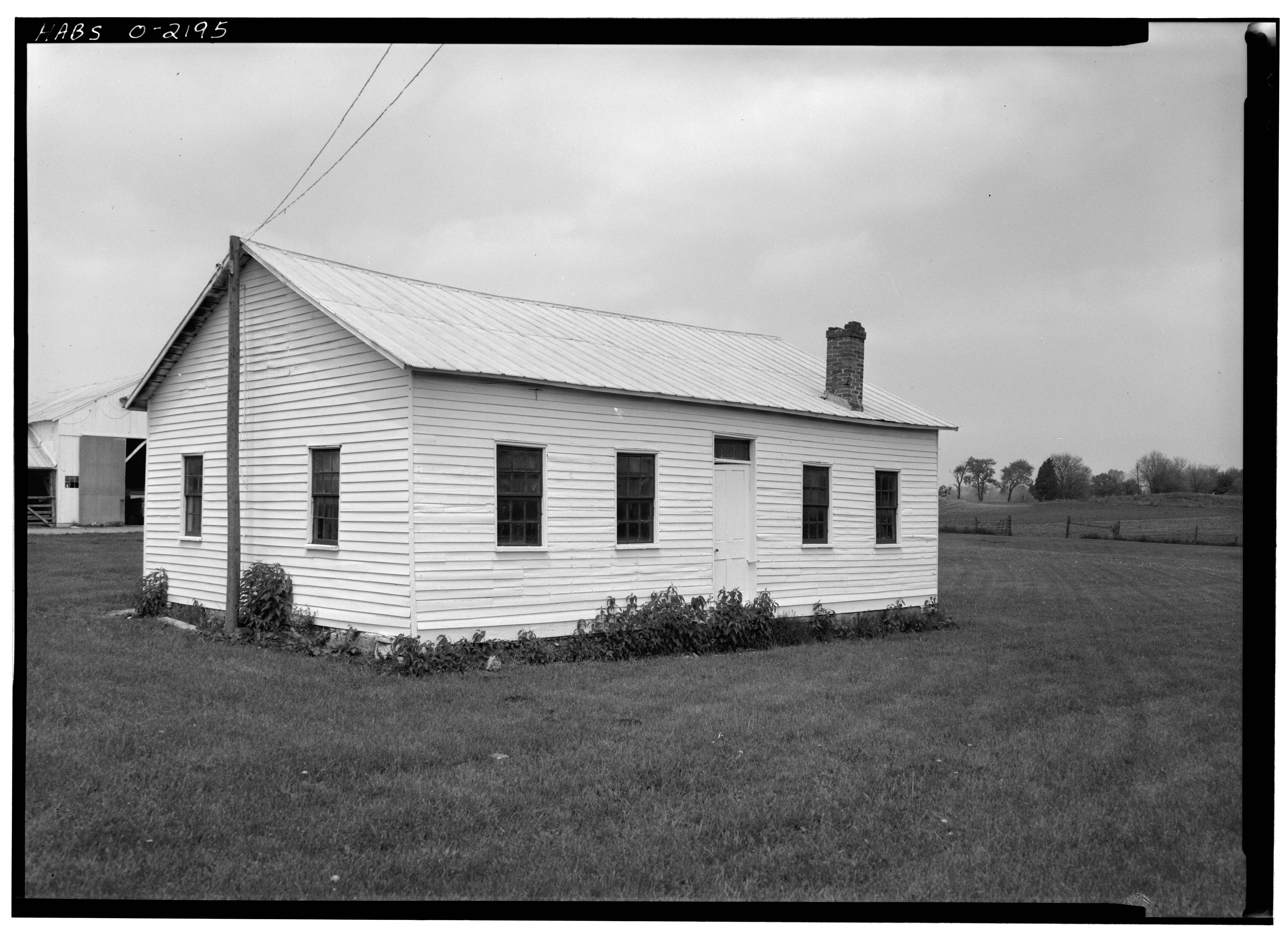
File:Historic_American_Buildings_Survey,_May,_1974_VIEW_FROM_SOUTHEAST._-_Shaker_North_Family,_Seed_House,_Oxford_Road,_White_Water_Park,_Hamilton_County,_OH_HABS_OHIO,31-WHIT,8-1.tif

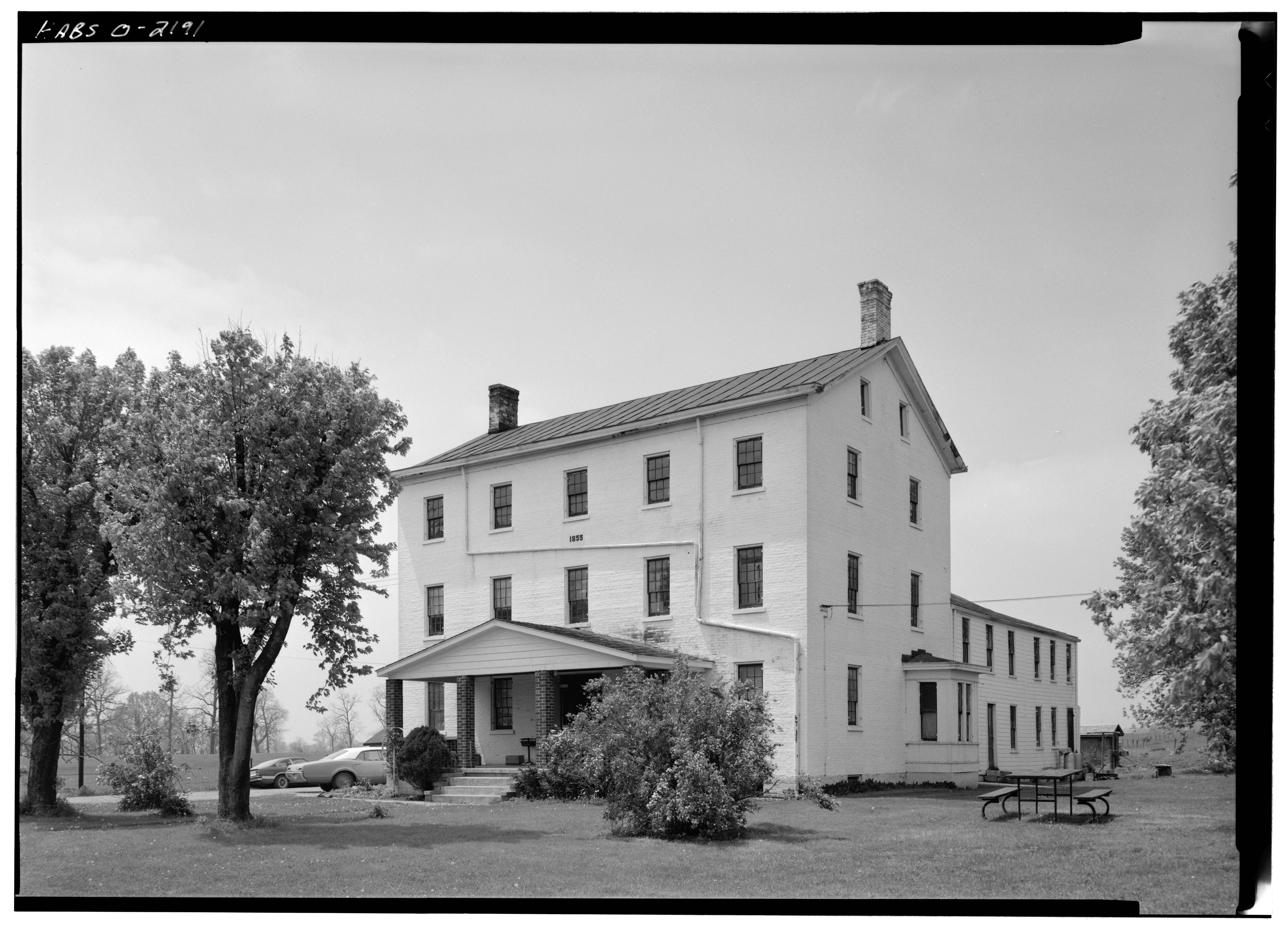
File:Historic_American_Buildings_Survey,_May,_1974_VIEW_FROM_NORTHEAST._-_Shaker_Centre_Family,_Trustees'_Office,_Oxford_Road,_White_Water_Park,_Hamilton_County,_OH_HABS_OHIO,31-WHIT,2-1.tif

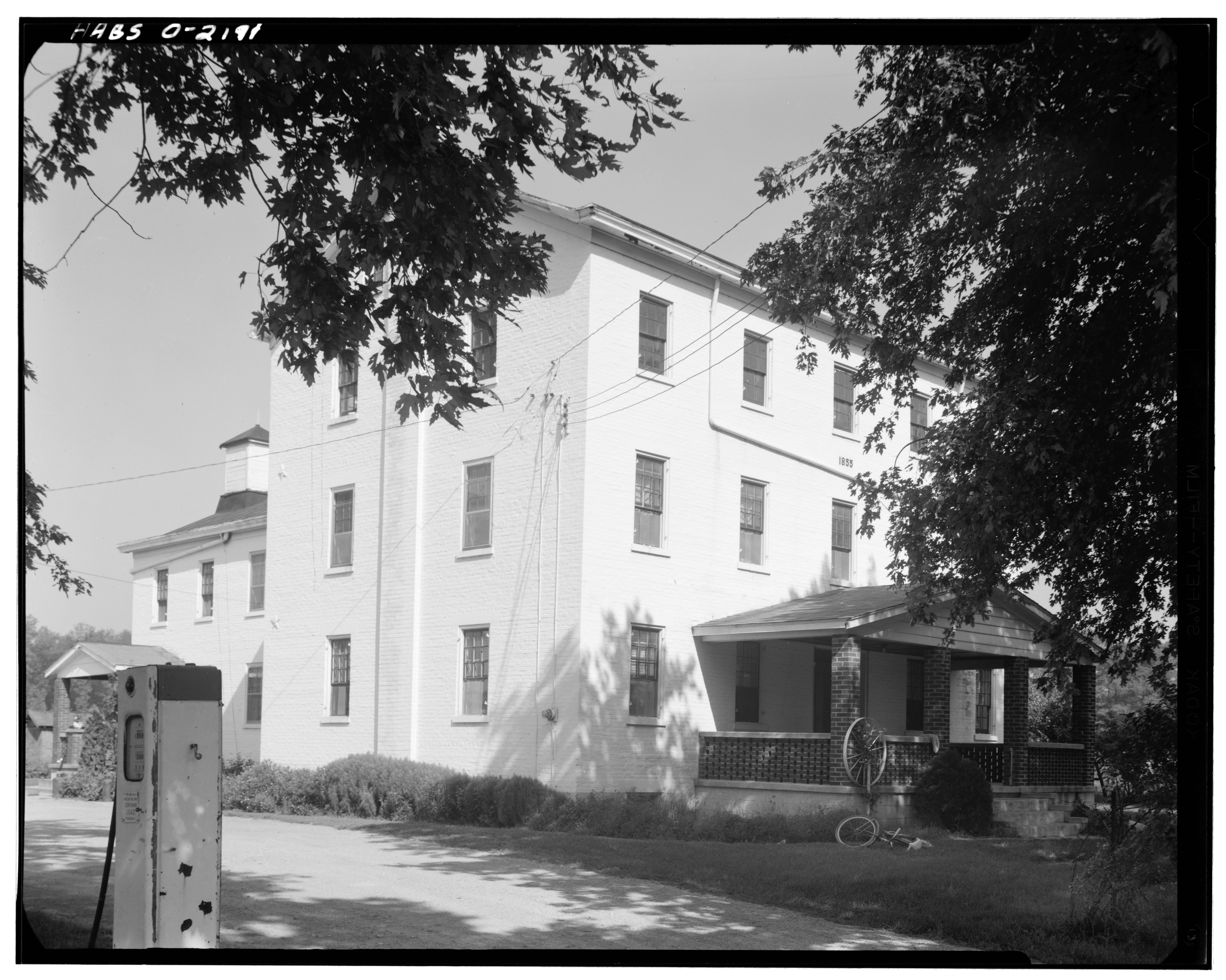
File:Historic_American_Buildings_Survey,_Elmer_R._Pearson,_Photographer,_1968_ELEVATION,_LOOKING_NORTHEAST._-_Shaker_Centre_Family,_Trustees'_Office,_Oxford_Road,_White_Water_Park,_HABS_OHIO,31-WHIT,2-3.tif

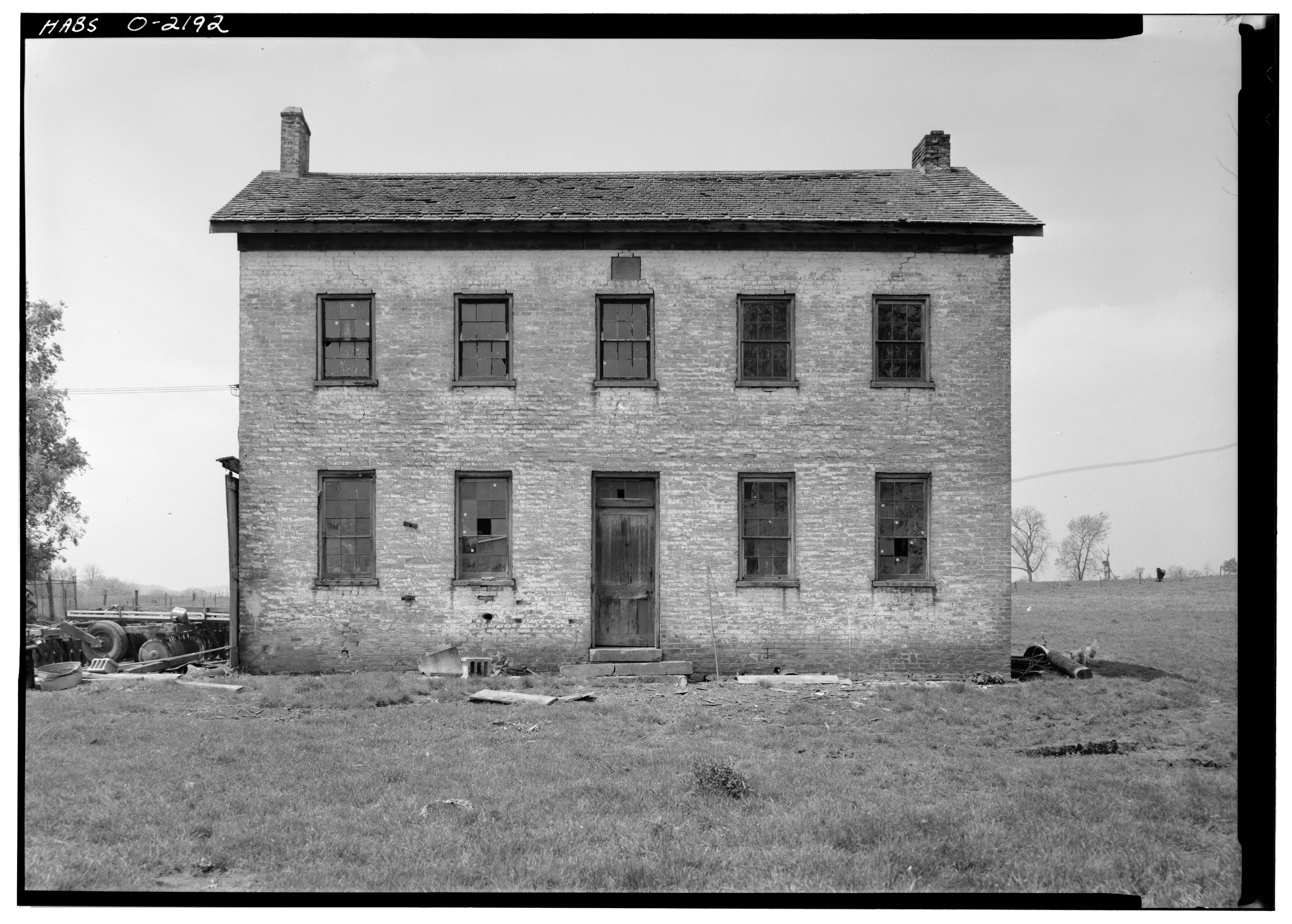
File:Historic_American_Buildings_Survey,_May,_1974_EAST_ELEVATION._-_Shaker_Centre_Family,_Washhouse,_Oxford_Road,_White_Water_Park,_Hamilton_County,_OH_HABS_OHIO,31-WHIT,3-1.tif

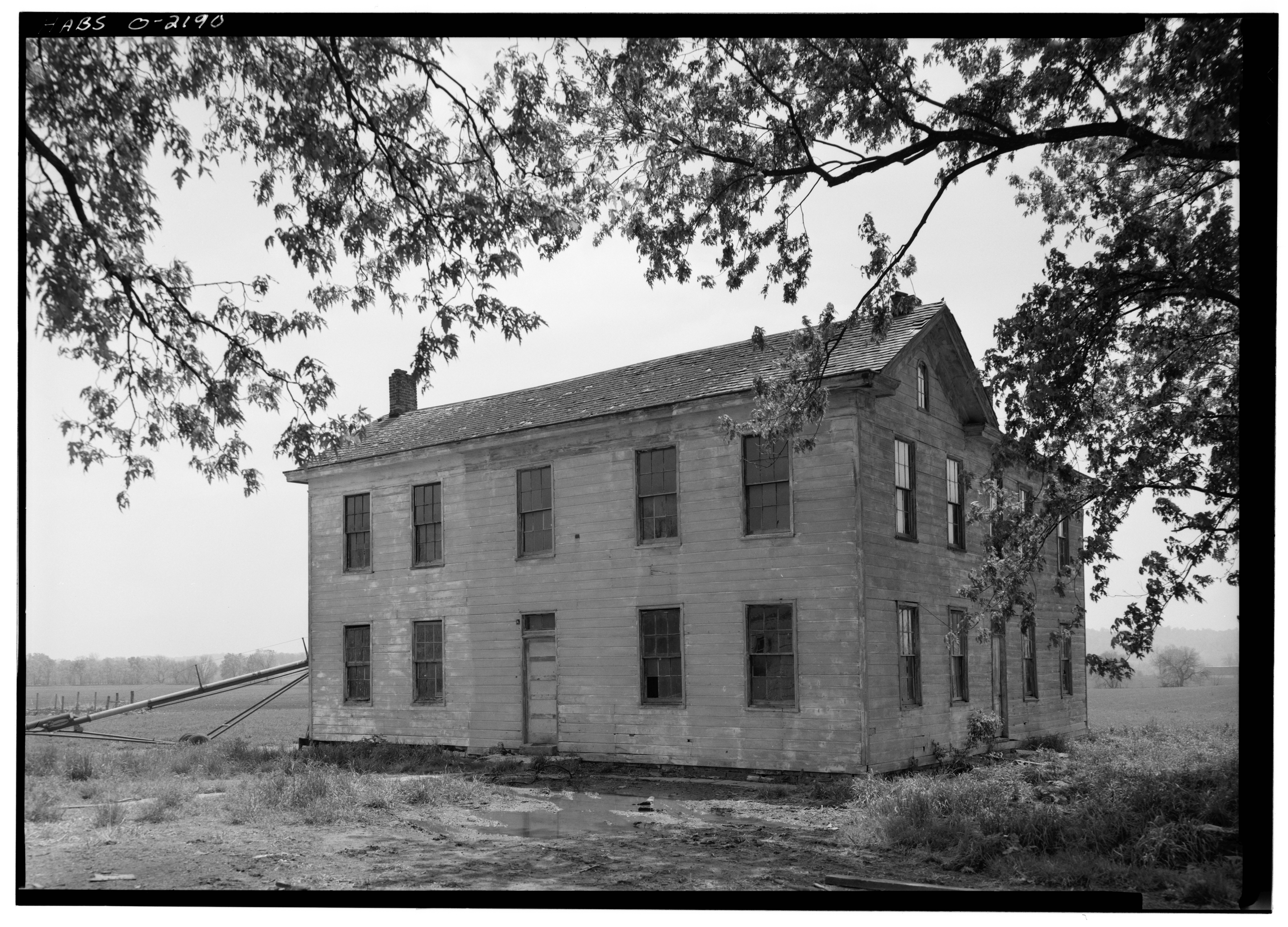
File:Historic_American_Buildings_Survey,_May,_1974_VIEW_FROM_NORTHWEST._-_Shaker_Centre_Family,_Broom_Shop,_East_side_of_Oxford_Road,_White_Water_Park,_Hamilton_County,_OH_HABS_OHIO,31-WHIT,1-1.tif

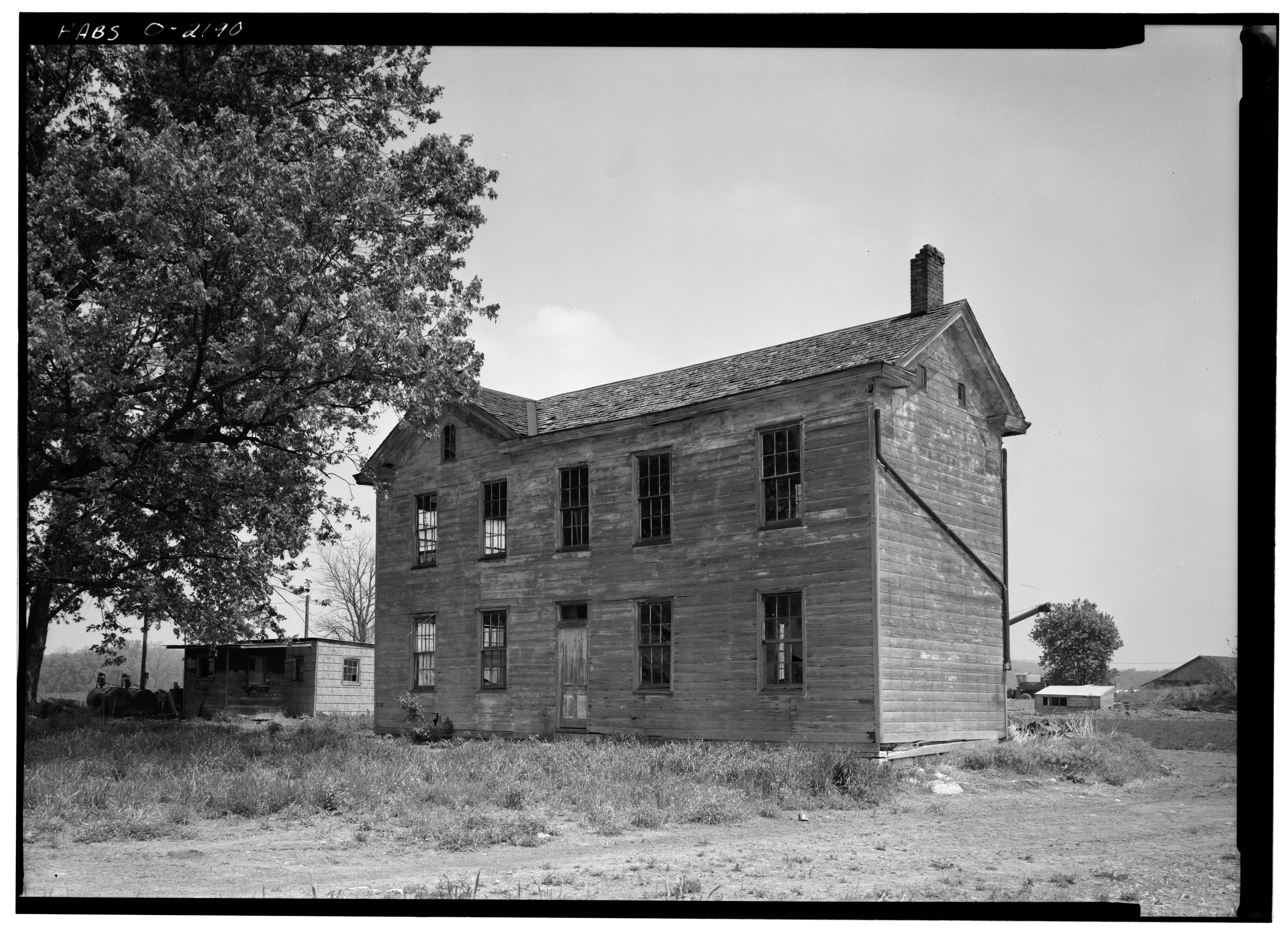
File:Historic_American_Buildings_Survey,_May,_1974_VIEW_FROM_SOUTHWEST._-_Shaker_Centre_Family,_Broom_Shop,_East_side_of_Oxford_Road,_White_Water_Park,_Hamilton_County,_OH_HABS_OHIO,31-WHIT,1-2.tif

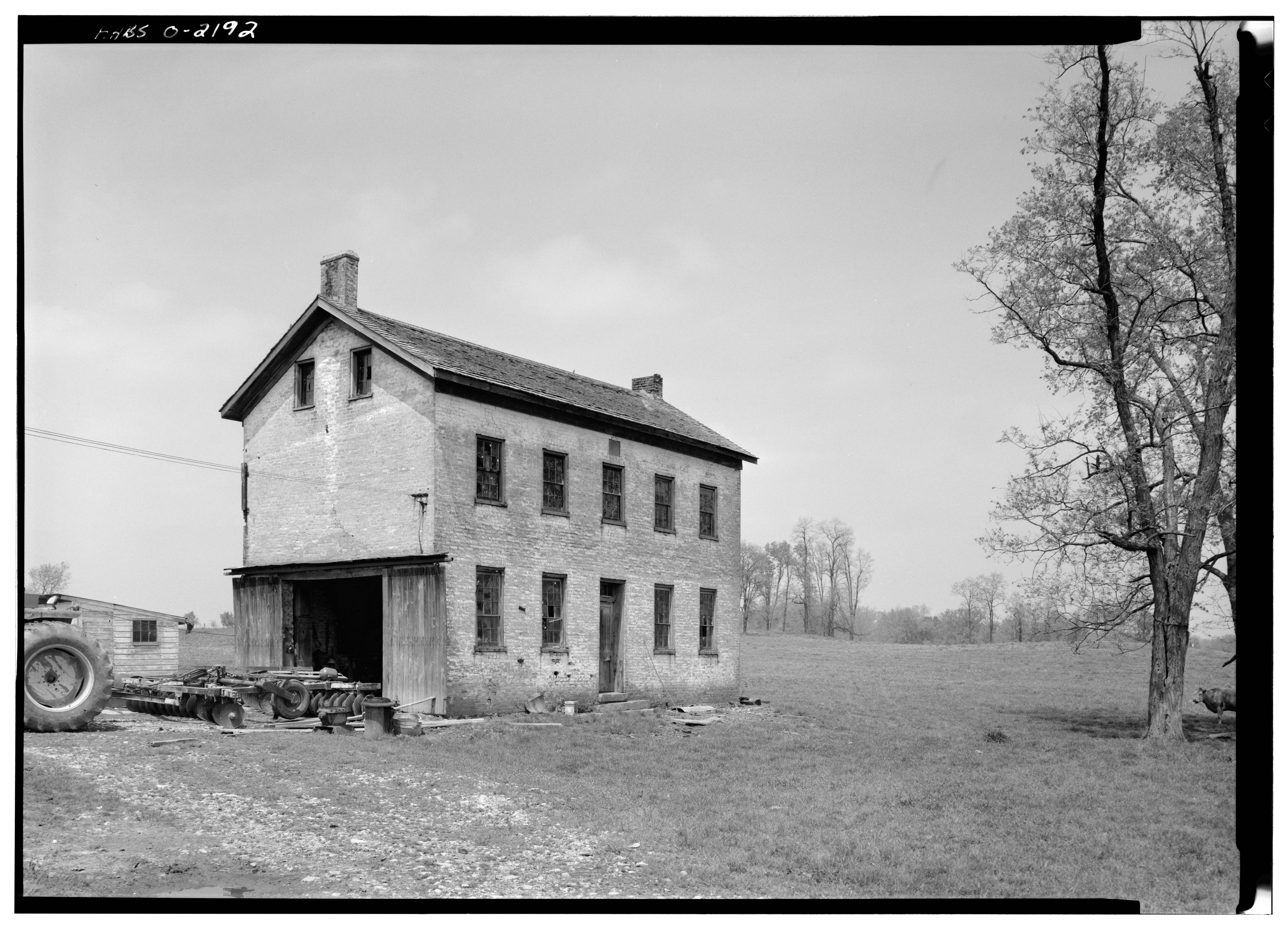
File:Historic_American_Buildings_Survey,_May,_1974_VIEW_FROM_SOUTHEAST._-_Shaker_Centre_Family,_Washhouse,_Oxford_Road,_White_Water_Park,_Hamilton_County,_OH_HABS_OHIO,31-WHIT,3-4.tif

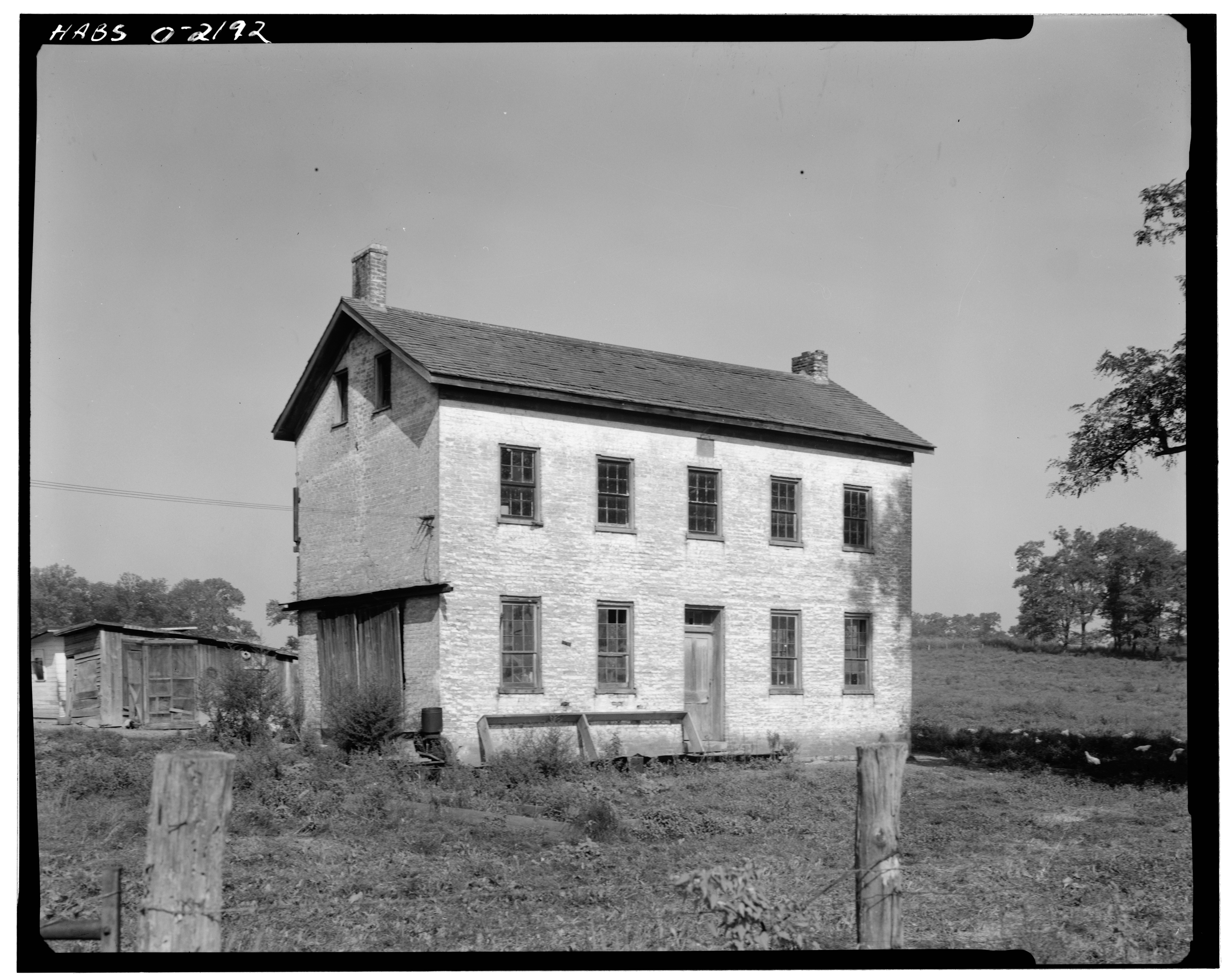
File:Historic_American_Buildings_Survey,_Elmer_R._Pearson,_Photographer,_1968_VIEW_LOOKING_NORTHWEST._-_Shaker_Centre_Family,_Washhouse,_Oxford_Road,_White_Water_Park,_Hamilton_County_HABS_OHIO,31-WHIT,3-5.tif

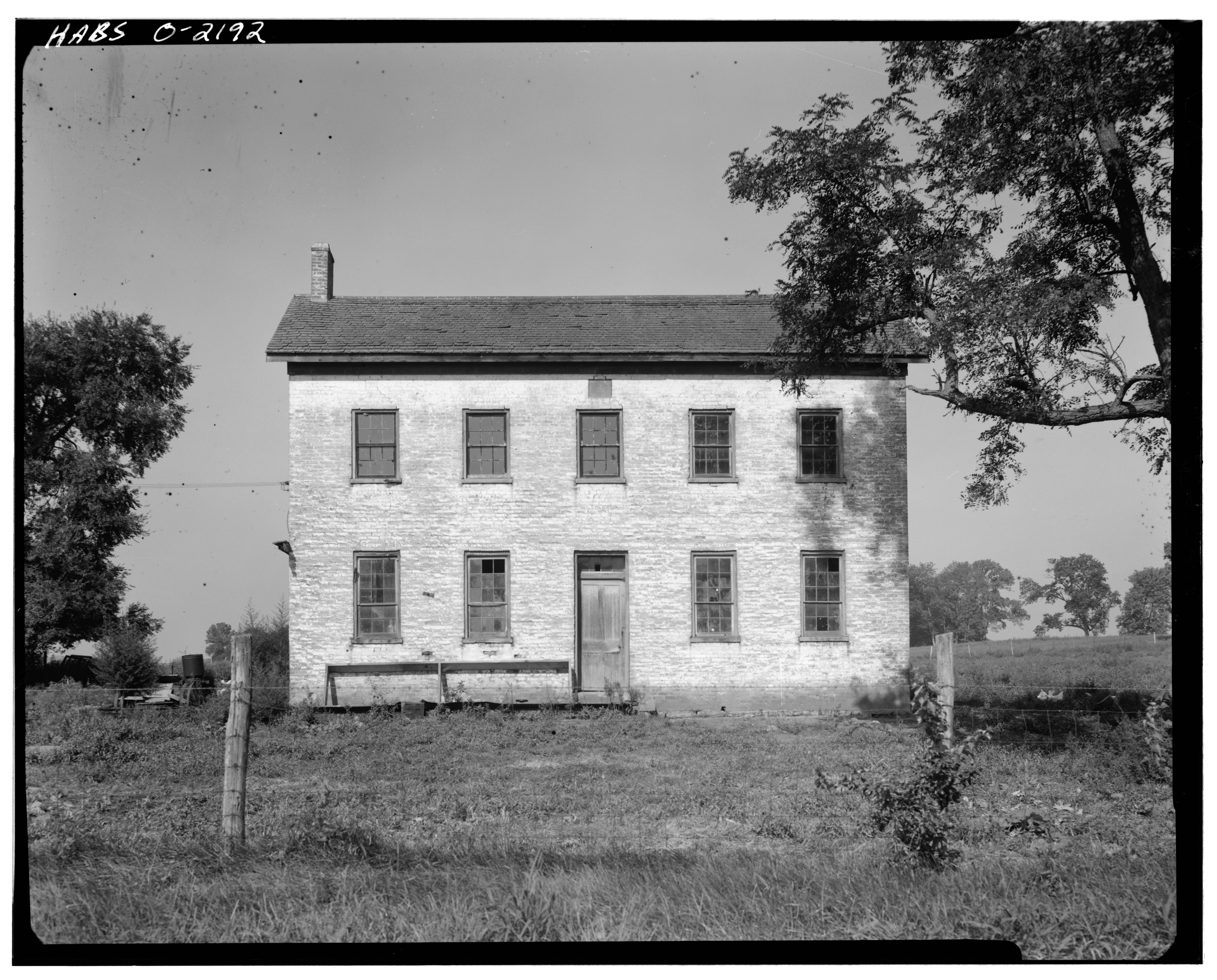
File:Historic_American_Buildings_Survey,_Elmer_R._Pearson,_Photographer,_1968_ELEVATION,_LOOKING_WEST._-_Shaker_Centre_Family,_Washhouse,_Oxford_Road,_White_Water_Park,_Hamilton_HABS_OHIO,31-WHIT,3-2.tif

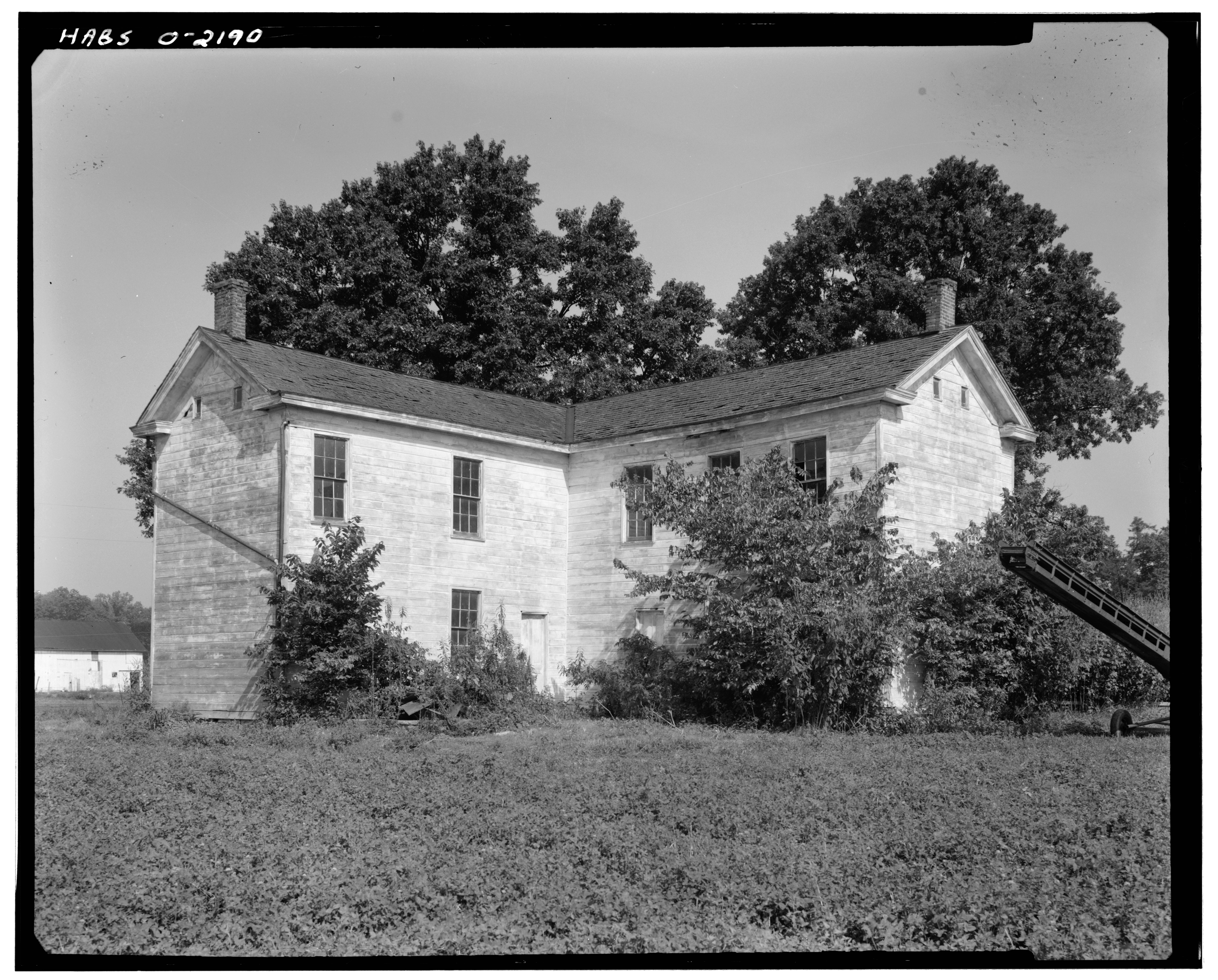
File:Historic_American_Buildings_Survey,_Elmer_R._Pearson,_Photographer,_1968_ELEVATION,_LOOKING_NORTHWEST._-_Shaker_Centre_Family,_Broom_Shop,_East_side_of_Oxford_Road,_White_Water_HABS_OHIO,31-WHIT,1-3.tif

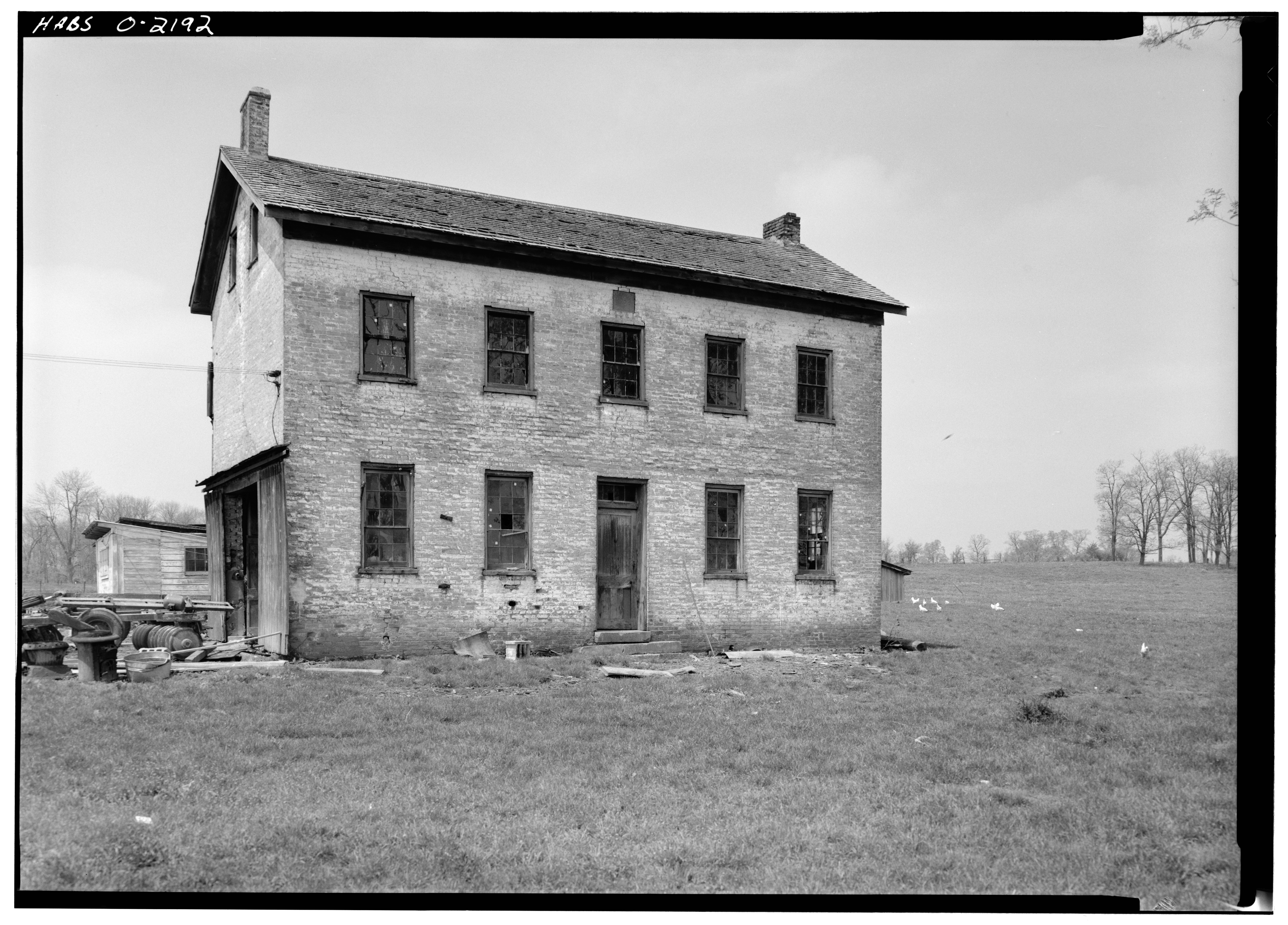
File:Historic_American_Buildings_Survey,_May,_1974_VIEW_FROM_SOUTHEAST._-_Shaker_Centre_Family,_Washhouse,_Oxford_Road,_White_Water_Park,_Hamilton_County,_OH_HABS_OHIO,31-WHIT,3-3.tif

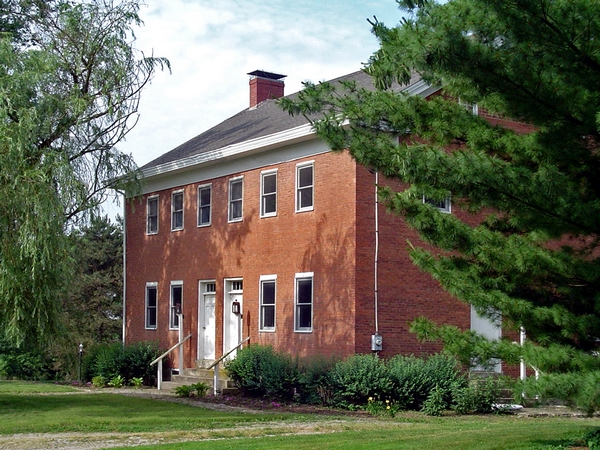
File:Meeting_House.jpg
