= New Haven Township, Michigan =

New Haven Township is the name of some places in the U.S. state of Michigan:

- New Haven Township, Gratiot County, Michigan
- New Haven Township, Shiawassee County, Michigan

== See also ==
- New Haven, Michigan, a village in Macomb County
- New Haven Township (disambiguation)
