= North Haven =

North Haven may refer to:

- North Haven, South Australia, Australia
- North Haven, New South Wales, Australia
- North Haven, Calgary, Alberta, Canada
- North Haven, Connecticut, U.S.
  - North Haven station
- North Haven, Maine, U.S.
- North Haven, New York, U.S.
- North Haven, a proposed unitary authority similar to Ipswich and South Suffolk, Suffolk, England

== See also ==
- Haven (disambiguation)
- New Haven (disambiguation)
- South Haven (disambiguation)
- East Haven (disambiguation)
- West Haven (disambiguation)
