= Ross Township, Butler County, Ohio =

Township in Ohio, US

- Township
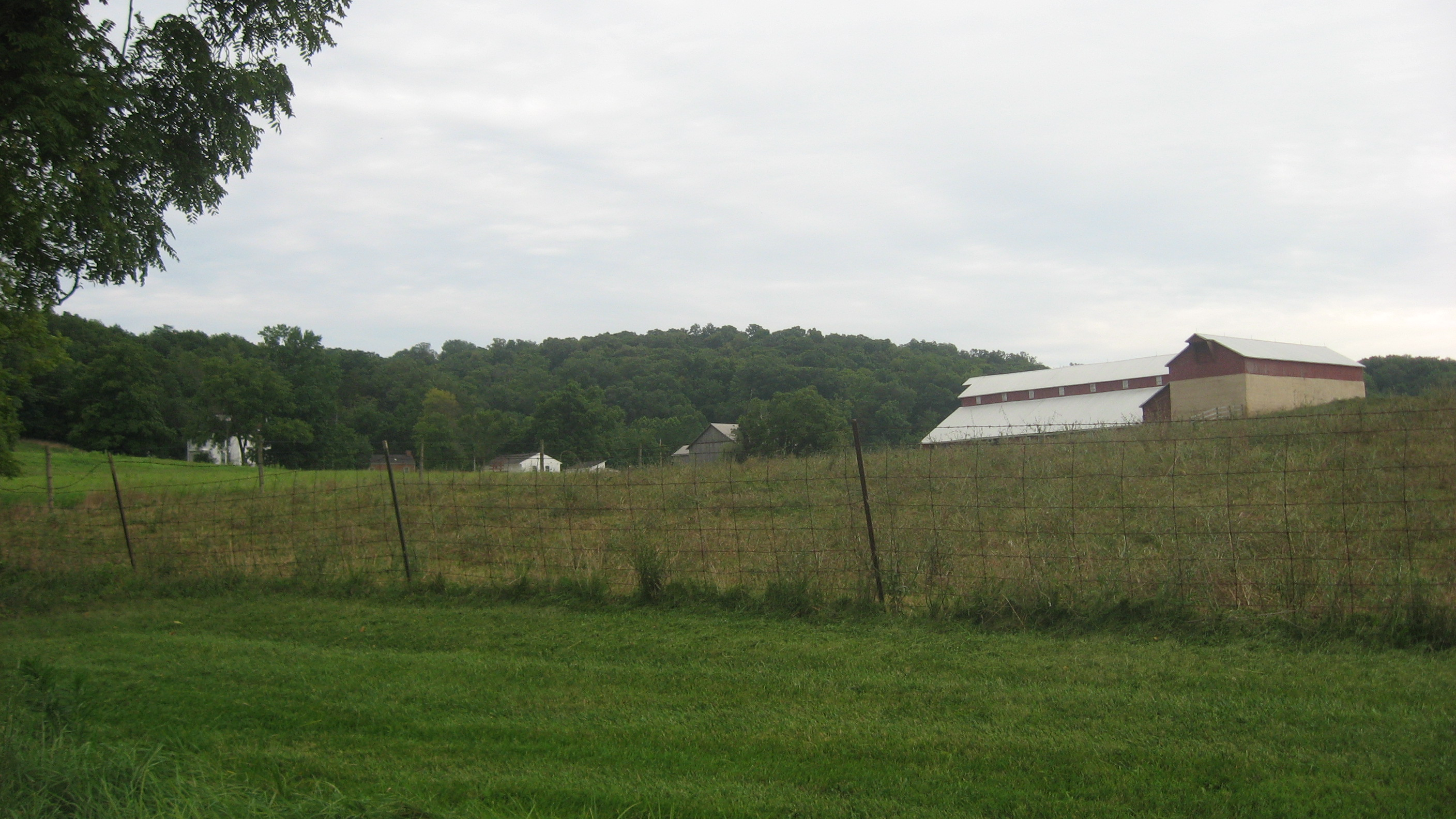
- The John Scott Farm, a historic farm in the township

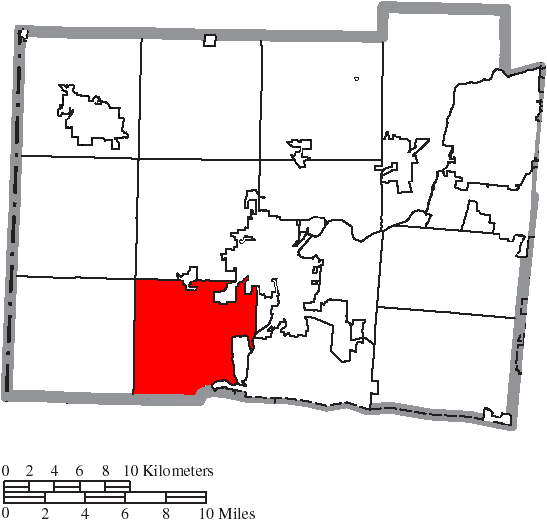
- Location of Ross Township in Butler County
- Coordinates: 39°21′0″N 84°38′50″W
- Country: United States
- State: Ohio
- County: Butler

Area
  - Total: 30.4 sq mi (78.7 km^{2})
  - Land: 30.2 sq mi (78.2 km^{2})
  - Water: 0.19 sq mi (0.5 km^{2})
- Elevation: 607 ft (185 m)

Population (2020)
  - Total: 8,736
  - Density: 277/sq mi (106.9/km^{2})
- Time zone: UTC-5 (Eastern (EST))
  - Summer (DST): UTC-4 (EDT)
- ZIP code: 45061
- Area code: 513
- FIPS code: 39-68616
- GNIS feature ID: 1085819
- Website: www.rosstwp.org

Ross Township is one of thirteen townships in Butler County, Ohio, United States. It is located in the south-central part of the county, southwest of the city of Hamilton. The population was 8,736 at the 2020 census.

== History ==
One of the five original townships of the county, it was erected by the Butler County Court of Quarter Sessions on May 10, 1803.

== Geography ==
Located in the southern part of the county, it borders the following townships:

- Hanover Township - north
- St. Clair Township - northeast
- Fairfield Township - east
- Colerain Township, Hamilton County - southeast
- Crosby Township, Hamilton County - southwest
- Morgan Township - west
- Reily Township - northwest corner

The census-designated place of Ross is located along the township's southern border.

=== Name ===
It is named for James Ross (1762–1847), a Federalist United States senator from Pennsylvania when the township was erected. Statewide, other Ross Townships are located in Greene and Jefferson counties.

== Government ==
The township is governed by a three-member board of trustees, who are elected in November of odd-numbered years to a four-year term beginning on the following January 1. Two are elected in the year after the presidential election and one is elected in the year before it. There is also an elected township fiscal officer, who serves a four-year term beginning on April 1 of the year after the election, which is held in November of the year before the presidential election. Vacancies in the fiscal officership or on the board of trustees are filled by the remaining trustees.
