= Ross, Ohio =

- Census-designated place
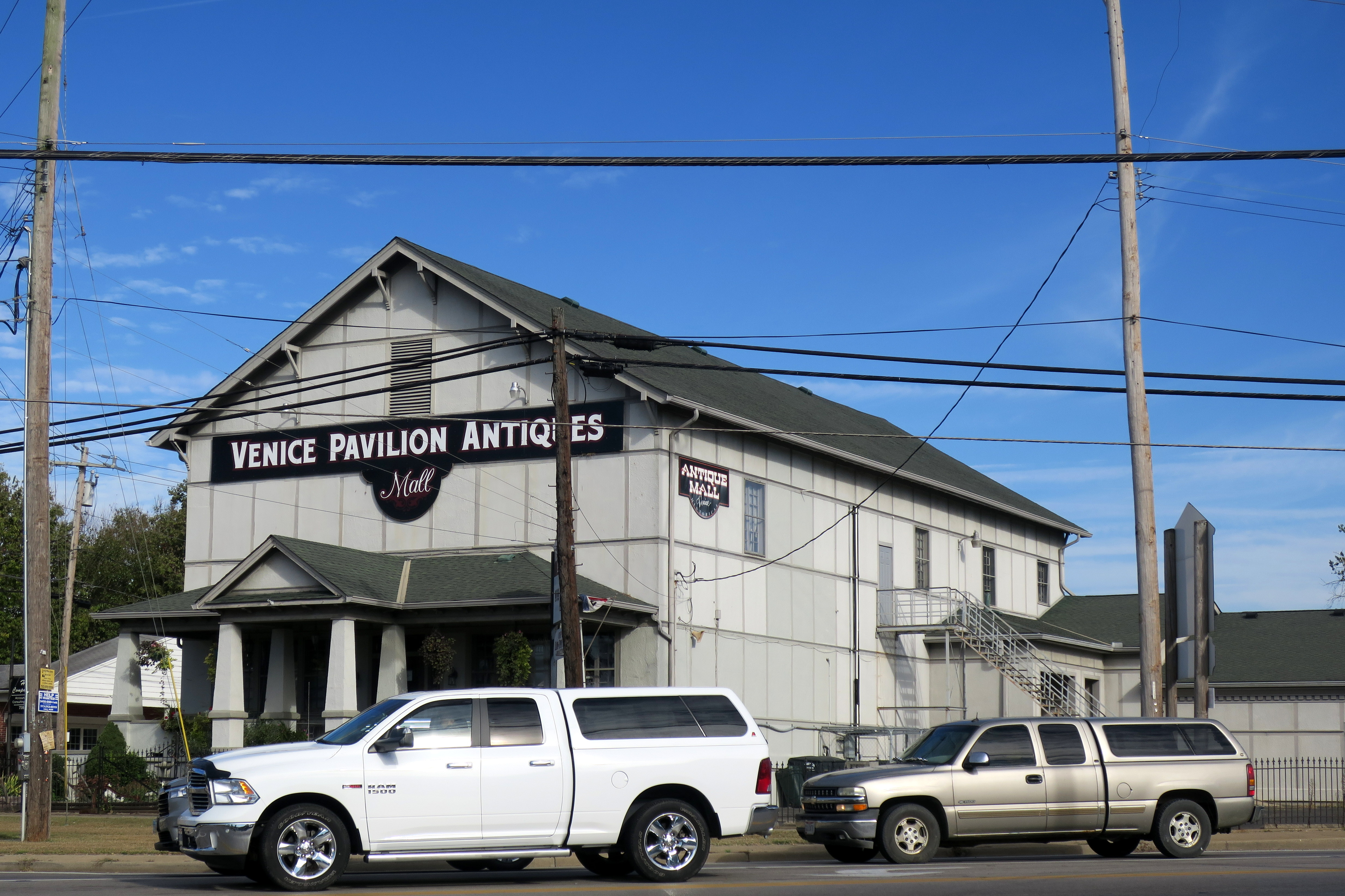
- Venice Pavilion is a prominent landmark in Ross

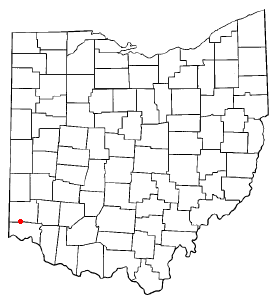
- Location of Ross, Ohio
- Coordinates: 39°18′53″N 84°39′36″W
- Country: United States
- State: Ohio
- County: Butler
- Township: Ross

Area
  - Total: 3.15 sq mi (8.17 km^{2})
  - Land: 3.13 sq mi (8.10 km^{2})
  - Water: 0.027 sq mi (0.07 km^{2})
- Elevation: 558 ft (170 m)

Population (2020)
  - Total: 3,478
  - Density: 1,112.5/sq mi (429.52/km^{2})
- Time zone: UTC-5 (Eastern (EST))
  - Summer (DST): UTC-4 (EDT)
- ZIP code: 45061
- Area code: 513
- FIPS code: 39-68602
- GNIS feature ID: 2393217

Ross is a census-designated place (CDP) in Ross Township, Butler County, Ohio, United States. The population was 3,478 at the 2020 census. Ross sits along U.S. Route 27 between Cincinnati, Ohio and Oxford, Ohio. Ross is part of the Cincinnati metropolitan area.

== History ==
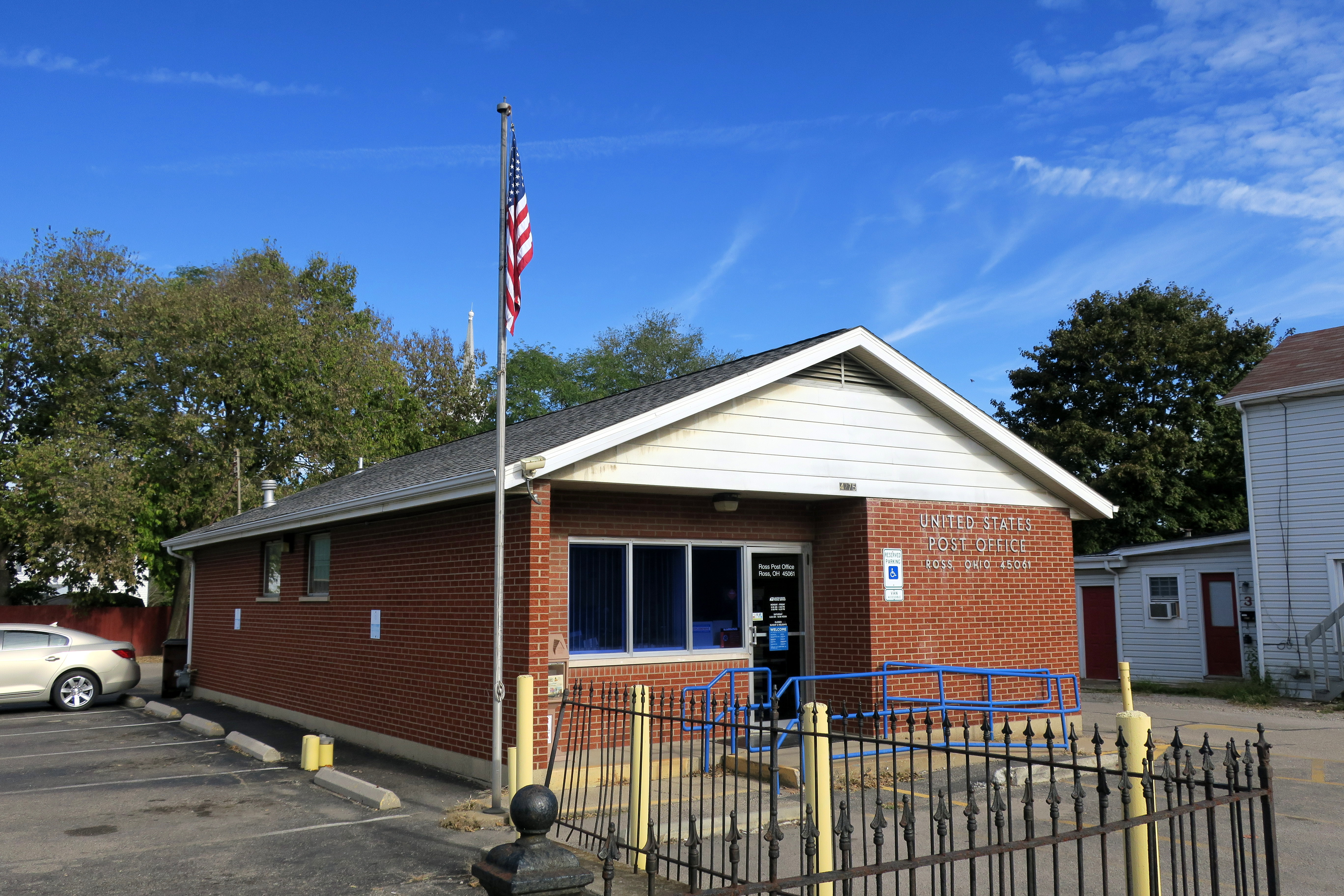
US Post Office in Ross

The settlement was laid out by Dr. Benjamin Franklin Clark on February 1, 1817, as Venus; the spelling later became corrupted as "Venice". Since there was already another post office in the state called Venice, near Lake Erie, this one was renamed in 1834 as Ross.

== Geography ==
Ross is located along the southern border of Butler County. To the south are the townships of Crosby and Colerain in Hamilton County, including the CDP of Dunlap in Colerain Township.

U.S. Route 27 forms the eastern edge of the CDP, leading south to Cincinnati and north to Oxford. State Routes 126 and Ohio State Route 128 run through the center of Ross as Hamilton Cleves Road. Route 126 splits off to the west toward Brookville, Indiana, while Route 128 continues southwest towards Cleves. The Great Miami River forms the southeastern edge of the CDP.

According to the United States Census Bureau, the CDP of Ross has a total area of 3.14 square miles (8.14 km^{2}), of which 3.12 square miles (8.07 km^{2}) is land and 0.027 square miles (0.07 km^{2}), or 0.85%, is water.

== Demographics ==
Historical population
Census	Pop.	Note	%±
2020	3,478		—
U.S. Decennial Census

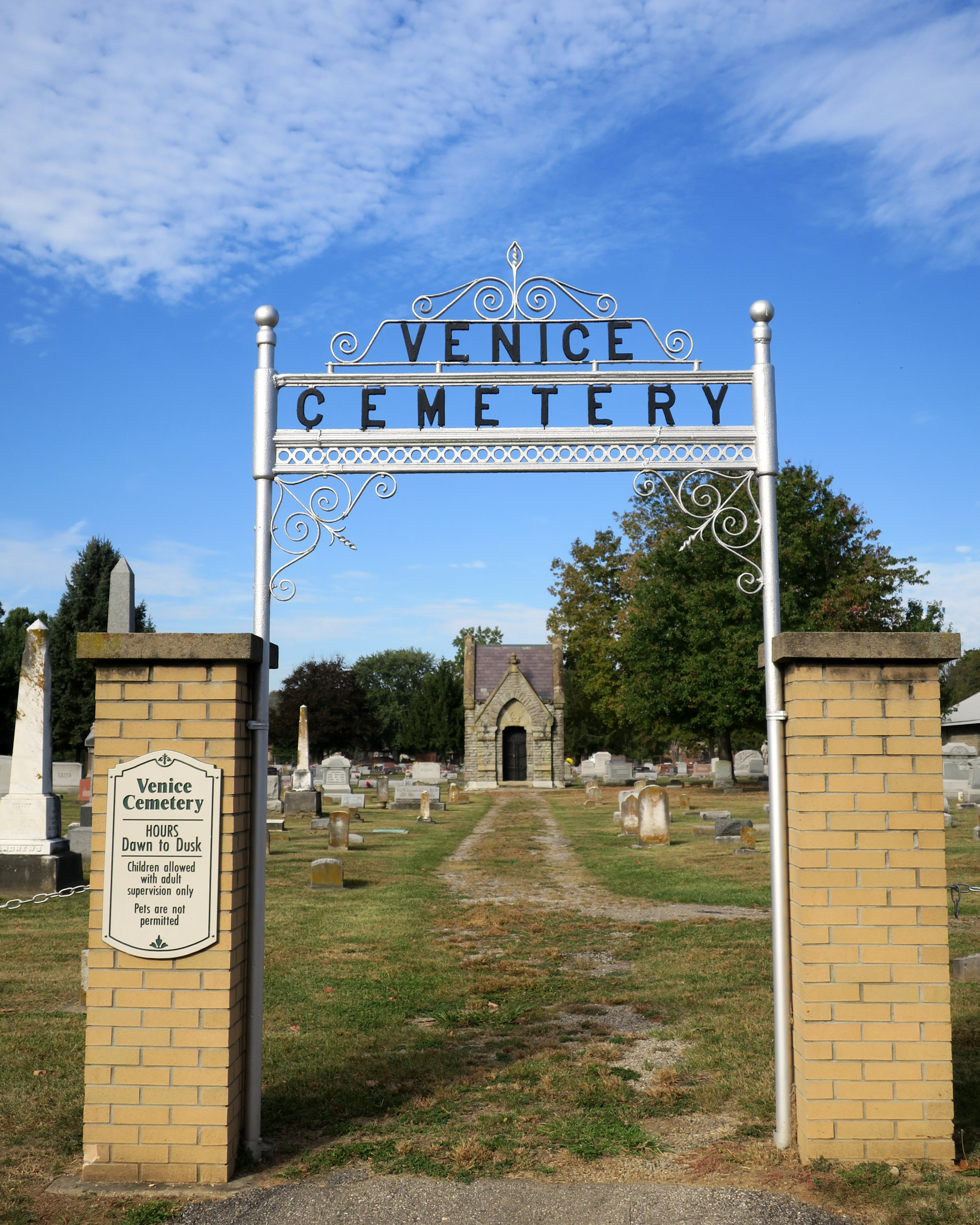
Venice Cemetery in Ross

=== 2020 census ===
As of the 2020 census, Ross had a population of 3,478. The median age was 41.6 years. 24.6% of residents were under the age of 18 and 18.8% of residents were 65 years of age or older. For every 100 females there were 98.3 males, and for every 100 females age 18 and over there were 96.7 males age 18 and over.

0.0% of residents lived in urban areas, while 100.0% lived in rural areas.

There were 1,308 households in Ross, of which 32.9% had children under the age of 18 living in them. Of all households, 58.5% were married-couple households, 14.4% were households with a male householder and no spouse or partner present, and 21.8% were households with a female householder and no spouse or partner present. About 22.3% of all households were made up of individuals and 11.4% had someone living alone who was 65 years of age or older.

There were 1,374 housing units, of which 4.8% were vacant. The homeowner vacancy rate was 1.3% and the rental vacancy rate was 2.1%.

Racial composition as of the 2020 census
Race	Number	Percent
White	3,265	93.9%
Black or African American	19	0.5%
American Indian and Alaska Native	7	0.2%
Asian	9	0.3%
Native Hawaiian and Other Pacific Islander	0	0.0%
Some other race	9	0.3%
Two or more races	169	4.9%
Hispanic or Latino (of any race)	31	0.9%

=== 2000 census ===
As of the census of 2000, there were 1,971 people, 725 households, and 551 families residing in the CDP. The population density was 1,162.8 inhabitants per square mile (449.0/km^{2}). There were 753 housing units at an average density of 444.2 per square mile (171.5/km^{2}). The racial makeup of the CDP was 97.97% White, 0.20% African American, 0.36% Native American, 0.20% Asian, 0.10% from other races, and 1.17% from two or more races. Hispanic or Latino of any race were 0.61% of the population.

There were 725 households, out of which 37.8% had children under the age of 18 living with them, 58.9% were married couples living together, 12.0% had a female householder with no husband present, and 24.0% were non-families. 20.1% of all households were made up of individuals, and 8.1% had someone living alone who was 65 years of age or older. The average household size was 2.72 and the average family size was 3.13.

In the CDP, the population was spread out, with 27.1% under the age of 18, 9.3% from 18 to 24, 29.2% from 25 to 44, 22.9% from 45 to 64, and 11.5% who were 65 years of age or older. The median age was 36 years. For every 100 females, there were 93.8 males. For every 100 females age 18 and over, there were 91.3 males.

The median income for a household in the CDP was $41,429, and the median income for a family was $46,354. Males had a median income of $37,463 versus $26,167 for females. The per capita income for the CDP was $18,701. About 4.1% of families and 3.6% of the population were below the poverty line, including 6.5% of those under age 18 and none of those age 65 or over.

== Economics ==
Ross functions as a bedroom community northwest of Cincinnati, and includes small businesses and family-owned restaurants, serving the local community and travelers along US-27.

== Education ==
Ross Local Schools serve the CDP proper and surrounding Ross Township. The buildings are located on three campuses and serve Kindergarten through 12th grade. The athletic teams are known as the Rams and compete in the Southwest Ohio Conference (SWOC).

=== Schools ===
- Morgan Elementary School
- Elda Elementary School
- Ross Intermediate School
- Ross Middle School
- Ross High School
