= Crosby Township, Ohio =

Township in Ohio, US

- Township
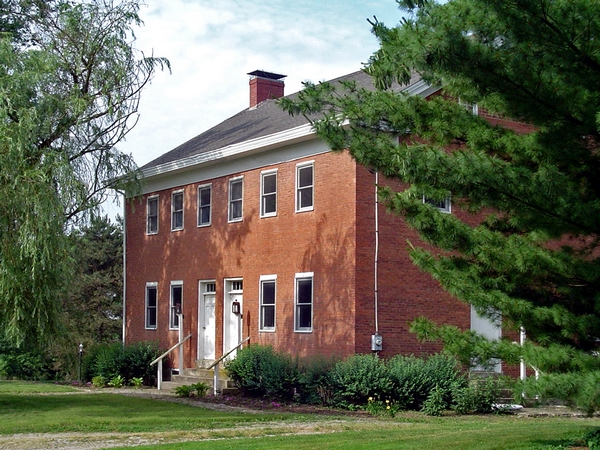
- Meeting house at the Whitewater Shaker Settlement

- Location in Hamilton County and the state of Ohio.
- Coordinates: 39°16′28″N 84°42′50″W
- Country: United States
- State: Ohio
- County: Hamilton

Area
  - Total: 20.2 sq mi (52.3 km^{2})
  - Land: 19.8 sq mi (51.2 km^{2})
  - Water: 0.42 sq mi (1.1 km^{2})
- Elevation: 590 ft (180 m)

Population (2020)
  - Total: 6,030
  - Density: 305/sq mi (117.8/km^{2})
- Time zone: UTC-5 (Eastern (EST))
  - Summer (DST): UTC-4 (EDT)
- ZIP code: 45030
- Area code: 513
- FIPS code: 39-19470
- GNIS feature ID: 1086204
- Website: www.crosbytwp.org

Crosby Township is one of the twelve townships of Hamilton County, Ohio, United States. The 2020 census found 6,030 people in the township.

== History ==
The lands in Crosby Township were opened later and more slowly than its southern neighbors. While good land remained for sale in the more accessible townships there was little incentive to move this far away from the Ohio River. Difficulties with local Indians contributed to this delay.

Joab Comstock was the first settler. He came from New Haven, Connecticut, in 1801 and purchased several sections leading up from the banks of the Great Miami River. The township was organized in 1803.

The township politics in the nineteenth century were markedly pacifist due to the beliefs of resident Shakers and other denominations. During the Civil War, a subscription fund was raised and held by the township clerk, with the funds used to pay a bounty to a volunteer to replace any drafted subscriber. When the war and the draft ended in 1865, the remaining $1,200 was used to erect the frame building that has served as the Crosby Township Hall ever since.

=== Name ===
Named for Joab Comstock's mother Thankful Crosby, it is the only Crosby Township statewide. Willey Road however, may have been named for Joab's wife Eunice Willey.

== Geography ==
Located in the northwestern part of the county, it borders the following townships:

- Ross Township, Butler County - northeast
- Colerain Township - east
- Whitewater Township - south
- Harrison Township - west
- Morgan Township, Butler County - northwest

One municipality, Harrison, while located primarily in Harrison Township, extends eastward into Crosby Township.

The township's total area is 20 sq mi (52 km^{2}). The terrain rises in a series of hills from the Great Miami River in the southeast and the becomes more regular in the north and west. As of 1990, only 9% of the township's land had been developed for suburban use, while 60% was agricultural and 27% remained wooded. Most of the extensive County Park, Miami Whitewater Forest, is located in Crosby Township.

=== Settlements ===
While there are no formally organized villages in the township, there have been three settlements: New Baltimore, New Haven, and Whitewater Shaker Village.

New Baltimore, formed in 1819 by Samuel Pottinger, is situated on the Miami River about 4 miles (6 km) east of New Haven. In July 1863, Morgan's Raiders used a ford at New Baltimore to cross the Miami River.

New Haven was platted as a village by Joab Comstock in 1815. In the 19th century the village had a post office, but was known as "Preston". This was necessary since there was already a New Haven in Huron County, Ohio, and the name was assigned by the first postmaster, Alexander Preston Cavender.

In 1824 settlement was accelerated by the founding of Whitewater Shaker Village as a commune of the Shakers, the organization's fourth and last village in Ohio. Starting with 18 members and 20 acres (8.1 ha), the community eventually grew to over 125 members and occupied 1,400 acres (570 ha), and it remained an active community until it was abandoned in 1916 as a part of the general decline of the sect. Today the village's Shaker Cemetery is maintained by the township trustees and is open to the public; while most of the settlement's buildings remain along Oxford Road, they are all privately owned.

== Demographics ==
Historical population
Census	Pop.	Note	%±
1820	1,721		—
1850	1,303		—
1860	1,182		−9.3%
1870	2,514		112.7%
1880	1,043		−58.5%
1890	949		−9.0%
1900	883		−7.0%
1910	866		−1.9%
1920	758		−12.5%
1930	543		−28.4%
1940	942		73.5%
1950	1,021		8.4%
1960	1,464		43.4%
1970	1,747		19.3%
1980	2,470		41.4%
1990	2,665		7.9%
2000	2,748		3.1%
2010	2,767		0.7%
2020	6,030		117.9%

=== 2020 census ===
As of the census of 2020, there were 6,030 people living in the township, for a population density of 304.54 people per square mile (117.77/km^{2}). There were 2,196 housing units. The racial makeup of the township was 93.2% White, 0.7% Black or African American, 0.2% Native American, 0.8% Asian, 0.0% Pacific Islander, 0.4% from some other race, and 4.6% from two or more races. 1.5% of the population were Hispanic or Latino of any race.

There were 2,192 households, out of which 28.2% had children under the age of 18 living with them, 63.3% were married couples living together, 16.0% had a male householder with no spouse present, and 12.3% had a female householder with no spouse present. 18.6% of all households were made up of individuals, and 11.0% were someone living alone who was 65 years of age or older. The average household size was 2.57, and the average family size was 2.91.

22.6% of the township's population were under the age of 18, 65.3% were 18 to 64, and 12.1% were 65 years of age or older. The median age was 40.6. For every 100 females, there were 105.5 males.

According to the U.S. Census American Community Survey, for the period 2016-2020 the estimated median annual income for a household in the township was $106,770, and the median income for a family was $115,795. About 2.4% of the population were living below the poverty line, including 0.0% of those under age 18 and 0.0% of those age 65 or over. About 79.6% of the population were employed, and 36.1% had a bachelor's degree or higher.

== Government ==
The township is governed by a three-member board of trustees, who are elected in November of odd-numbered years to a four-year term beginning on the following January 1. Two are elected in the year after the presidential election and one is elected in the year before it. There is also an elected township fiscal officer, who serves a four-year term beginning on April 1 of the year after the election, which is held in November of the year before the presidential election. Vacancies in the fiscal officership or on the board of trustees are filled by the remaining trustees.

=== Fernald ===
A major issue in the township is the ongoing activity related to the clean-up of the Fernald plant site, which was built during World War II and was used to refine uranium isotopes needed for the first atom bomb.
