= List of homesteads in Western Australia: S =

This list includes all homesteads in Western Australia with a gazetted name. It is complete with respect to the 1996 Gazetteer of Australia. Dubious names have been checked against the online 2004 data, and in all cases confirmed correct. However, if any homesteads have been gazetted or deleted since 1996, this list does not reflect these changes. Strictly speaking, Australian place names are gazetted in capital letters only; the names in this list have been converted to mixed case in accordance with normal capitalisation conventions.

Name	Location	Remarks
Sabina Vale	33°40′S 115°25′E	
Sacor Farm	31°20′S 116°7′E	
Saddleworth	29°0′S 115°11′E	
Saint Aubyns	32°7′S 116°59′E	
Saint Francis Xavier Mission Farm	32°35′S 116°43′E	
Saint Ives	32°2′S 116°58′E	
Salisbury	34°15′S 118°26′E	
Saltbush	34°4′S 118°50′E	
Sammys Outcamp	25°31′S 113°0′E	
San Pedro	34°17′S 119°16′E	
San-mateo	34°24′S 117°29′E	
Sandalea	32°13′S 117°10′E	
Sandasea	29°29′S 115°19′E	
Sandgate	32°1′S 116°47′E	
Sandhurst	33°9′S 115°53′E	
Sandstone	34°25′S 117°23′E	
Sandy Camp	33°52′S 120°29′E	
Sang Pur	34°20′S 118°35′E	
Sangaree	30°31′S 115°47′E	
Sanmerino	32°13′S 118°10′E	
Sans Souci	33°47′S 117°2′E	
Santa Fe	29°14′S 115°15′E	
Santa Fe	33°28′S 121°53′E	
Santa Maria	34°51′S 117°32′E	
Santa Rita	33°42′S 115°56′E	
Santhoven	34°5′S 115°6′E	
Saughton	33°3′S 115°51′E	
Saunders Creek	18°3′S 127°59′E	
Scaddan West	33°21′S 121°22′E	
Schultz Farm	33°32′S 120°37′E	
Scott River Station	34°16′S 115°16′E	
Seabourne	31°57′S 116°54′E	
Seaton Ross	32°5′S 116°52′E	
Seaton Ross	30°56′S 116°25′E	
Seaview	33°34′S 115°28′E	
Seaview	33°7′S 115°55′E	
Seaview	34°2′S 115°2′E	
Seaview	29°12′S 114°57′E	
Seaview Farm	33°21′S 115°50′E	
Second Wind	33°31′S 121°55′E	
Seemore	30°59′S 115°25′E	
Seemore Downs	30°45′S 125°18′E	
Sefton	33°7′S 116°59′E	
Semova	33°41′S 115°11′E	
Seneschal	32°31′S 117°33′E	
Sevarg Downs	34°6′S 117°46′E	
Seven Trees	32°54′S 117°46′E	
Sevenhills	33°58′S 119°10′E	
Severn Hills	34°34′S 118°26′E	
Severngrove	32°3′S 116°59′E	
Seymour	34°6′S 118°28′E	
Shackerston	34°52′S 117°45′E	
Shackerston	33°48′S 119°19′E	
Shadawa Downs	34°12′S 119°11′E	
Shady Grove	29°0′S 114°48′E	
Shady Grove	29°17′S 115°11′E	
Shady Hills	31°42′S 116°4′E	
Shalimar	33°27′S 115°42′E	
Shalimar	34°31′S 117°36′E	
Shalimar	34°28′S 117°26′E	
Shalloch Vale	33°25′S 117°10′E	
Shalom Park Farm	33°46′S 116°0′E	
Shambayango	34°3′S 115°7′E	
Shamrock	18°36′S 122°0′E	
Shangri-la	33°56′S 117°3′E	
Shannon Vale	33°44′S 115°12′E	
Shao Lu	33°41′S 122°56′E	
Sharonville	32°52′S 118°30′E	
Shaster Downs	33°50′S 120°45′E	
Shaw Park	33°29′S 116°13′E	
Sheephills	33°3′S 117°6′E	
Sheffield Estate	34°14′S 116°47′E	
Shekinah	33°55′S 115°6′E	
Shelamar	18°59′S 121°43′E	
Shelderton	34°24′S 117°34′E	
Shelter Hills	29°38′S 115°21′E	
Sheneeda	33°14′S 118°51′E	
Shenfield	33°11′S 115°52′E	
Sheoak Drive	32°49′S 117°7′E	
Sheralee	33°53′S 118°50′E	
Sherlock	20°54′S 117°39′E	
Sherlock Gully	32°21′S 116°40′E	
Sheron	33°9′S 115°52′E	
Sherwood	26°34′S 118°32′E	
Sherwood	33°59′S 117°11′E	
Sherwood	34°57′S 117°53′E	
Shibden Grove	33°47′S 115°21′E	
Shiloh	33°43′S 122°6′E	
Shiralee	33°32′S 121°48′E	
Shirilee	33°49′S 120°46′E	
Shirleydale	33°25′S 116°22′E	
Shirralee	33°13′S 118°29′E	
Shirralee	33°34′S 122°29′E	
Shirric	33°48′S 118°58′E	
Sholom	34°28′S 117°14′E	
Shuttleworth	30°0′S 115°7′E	
Sidcup	34°34′S 117°19′E	
Siedda	33°14′S 121°46′E	
Silent Grove	17°4′S 125°15′E	Abandoned
Silver Hayes	33°36′S 117°55′E	
Silver Hills	31°19′S 116°51′E	
Silver Spring	31°20′S 116°33′E	
Silver Spring	33°19′S 115°47′E	
Silver Springs	33°14′S 115°56′E	
Silvercoir	32°31′S 118°25′E	
Silverdale	34°58′S 117°33′E	
Silverlands	33°59′S 116°16′E	
Simmental	33°42′S 115°6′E	
Singing Winds	33°44′S 120°53′E	
Skibblying	30°49′S 116°15′E	
Skye	34°42′S 118°6′E	
Sleepy Hollow	33°36′S 120°4′E	
Sleepy Hollow	34°8′S 115°16′E	
Smithfield	34°2′S 118°45′E	
Snaigow	32°57′S 116°37′E	
Snowbridge	33°46′S 115°11′E	
Snowdrift	34°36′S 117°4′E	
Solomons Well	31°12′S 116°22′E	
Somerby	34°35′S 117°26′E	
Somervale	29°57′S 116°30′E	
Sondrio	34°12′S 118°47′E	
Soothsay	33°42′S 120°56′E	
Sophie Downs	18°12′S 127°49′E	
Sorrento	33°58′S 117°29′E	
Sounness Park	34°58′S 117°52′E	
South Mooryary	29°16′S 115°20′E	
South Outcamp	28°54′S 120°59′E	
South Park	33°58′S 115°3′E	
South Rim	34°21′S 118°35′E	
South Stirling	34°35′S 118°12′E	
South Suffolk Stud	33°1′S 116°51′E	
South Vale	33°57′S 116°43′E	
South Wyola	31°44′S 117°25′E	
South-mark	33°10′S 116°52′E	
Southbourne	32°2′S 116°54′E	
Southend	29°58′S 116°18′E	
Southern Glen	34°6′S 117°1′E	
Southern Hills	32°12′S 122°50′E	
Southernhay	30°26′S 116°49′E	
Southward Park	33°51′S 115°13′E	
Split Rock	21°32′S 119°35′E	
Spring Camp Outcamp	24°54′S 116°33′E	
Spring Creek	34°21′S 117°31′E	
Spring Creek	16°49′S 128°52′E	
Spring Garden	31°31′S 116°25′E	
Spring Grove	33°43′S 117°46′E	
Spring Hill	34°10′S 117°47′E	
Spring Hill	33°58′S 116°18′E	
Spring Hill	31°17′S 115°36′E	
Spring Hill	33°44′S 115°53′E	
Spring Park	28°34′S 115°29′E	
Spring Valley	28°43′S 114°46′E	
Spring Valley	33°5′S 115°58′E	
Spring Valley	33°26′S 116°44′E	
Spring Valley	33°55′S 116°19′E	
Spring View	33°52′S 116°0′E	
Spring Villa	34°1′S 118°48′E	
Springdale	31°50′S 116°40′E	
Springdale	31°35′S 116°22′E	
Springdale	32°7′S 117°36′E	
Springfield	32°22′S 118°12′E	
Springfield	29°50′S 116°4′E	
Springfield	31°34′S 116°7′E	
Springfield	35°0′S 117°38′E	
Springfield	33°50′S 116°34′E	
Springfield	32°54′S 118°27′E	
Springfield Park	33°37′S 117°41′E	
Springhill	33°10′S 115°42′E	
Springlea Farm	31°21′S 116°53′E	
Springs	31°5′S 115°54′E	
Springston	33°0′S 117°0′E	
Springston	33°24′S 115°51′E	
Springston	33°0′S 117°0′E	
Springvale	29°55′S 115°10′E	
Springvale	33°57′S 118°1′E	
Springvale	33°52′S 116°31′E	
Springvale	34°38′S 117°29′E	
Springvale	17°47′S 127°41′E	
Springwell	34°45′S 118°6′E	
Spurbrook	33°47′S 115°21′E	
Square Tank Outcamp And Bore	24°52′S 114°2′E	
St Clair	32°27′S 118°13′E	
St Clair	33°47′S 117°16′E	
Stackallan	31°40′S 116°41′E	
Stanbray Farms	33°28′S 120°55′E	
Stanley Hill	32°13′S 118°1′E	
Stanmore	33°58′S 117°51′E	
Starhaven	33°47′S 117°4′E	
Staunton	33°6′S 119°7′E	
Stellamaris	33°56′S 118°26′E	
Stenwood	33°13′S 116°26′E	
Stirling Downs	33°7′S 119°45′E	
Stirling Plains	34°14′S 117°52′E	
Stirling View	33°50′S 117°29′E	
Stirling View	34°33′S 118°9′E	
Stirling View	34°35′S 117°46′E	
Stirling View	34°6′S 117°41′E	
Stockdale	33°7′S 117°55′E	
Stockdale	31°58′S 116°41′E	
Stockwell	33°53′S 115°9′E	
Stockwell	33°35′S 116°24′E	
Stoke Farm	33°1′S 117°17′E	
Stokehall Downs	30°31′S 115°20′E	
Stone Haven	33°57′S 115°14′E	
Stonehouse Farm	35°1′S 117°41′E	
Stony Park	31°29′S 116°6′E	
Stony Ridge	33°34′S 116°43′E	
Stonybroke	34°37′S 116°11′E	
Stottfold	33°17′S 115°48′E	
Strandheim	33°49′S 120°56′E	
Stratfield	29°38′S 116°19′E	
Strath Isla	32°49′S 117°0′E	
Strathalbyn	31°19′S 115°55′E	
Stratham Park	33°30′S 115°35′E	
Strathaven	32°14′S 118°10′E	
Strathblane	34°2′S 115°4′E	
Strathborn	33°13′S 116°55′E	
Strathbrook	33°53′S 115°47′E	
Strathdaly	33°37′S 121°34′E	
Strathdon	33°5′S 118°20′E	
Strathearn	33°43′S 118°0′E	
Strathline	32°17′S 116°44′E	
Strathmore	30°37′S 115°38′E	
Strathmore	33°33′S 117°22′E	
Strathmuir	32°47′S 117°28′E	
Strathnairn	33°31′S 115°55′E	
Strawberry Farm	34°37′S 117°26′E	
Strelley	20°26′S 118°59′E	
Stuart Downs	33°45′S 120°58′E	
Sturt Creek	19°10′S 128°10′E	
Sturt Meadows	28°41′S 120°58′E	
Subasio Downs	34°24′S 118°31′E	
Suire Valley	33°50′S 117°57′E	
Summer Hill	27°57′S 114°43′E	
Summerfield	33°40′S 117°24′E	
Summerfields	33°44′S 115°13′E	
Summerlea	33°34′S 115°36′E	
Summerly	34°32′S 117°38′E	
Suncal Park	34°46′S 117°57′E	
Sundale	34°29′S 117°33′E	
Sundown	28°50′S 114°55′E	
Sundowner Ranch	34°28′S 117°13′E	
Sunhaven	31°20′S 115°40′E	
Sunni Brook	33°21′S 115°48′E	
Sunnipara	29°44′S 115°18′E	
Sunny Brook	33°37′S 121°40′E	
Sunny Hill	31°20′S 116°52′E	
Sunny Hills	33°38′S 115°51′E	
Sunny Valley	33°32′S 116°19′E	
Sunny Valley North	33°31′S 116°20′E	
Sunnydale	31°35′S 116°6′E	
Sunnydale	33°53′S 117°15′E	
Sunnyside	33°3′S 116°47′E	
Sunnyside	33°29′S 117°58′E	
Sunnyside	33°51′S 117°35′E	
Sunnyside	34°57′S 118°0′E	
Sunnyside	34°50′S 117°34′E	
Sunnyside	33°16′S 115°49′E	
Sunnyside Farm	33°24′S 115°46′E	
Sunnyvale	31°33′S 116°22′E	
Sunnyvale	34°54′S 117°52′E	
Sunnyvale	33°42′S 115°52′E	
Sunnyvale	33°49′S 117°12′E	
Sunset	31°34′S 116°7′E	
Sunvale	31°13′S 116°8′E	
Surat Kumar	34°32′S 115°59′E	
Sussex Barn	34°59′S 117°37′E	
Sutherland	33°43′S 116°28′E	
Sutherlands	33°18′S 115°49′E	
Swallow Dale	34°38′S 118°2′E	
Swan Hill	31°33′S 116°45′E	
Swan Lagoon	33°17′S 121°38′E	
Swan Poole	33°29′S 116°51′E	
Swanlake	34°43′S 118°27′E	
Sweetwater	33°46′S 115°59′E	
Sydenham	33°12′S 119°11′E	
Sylvan Loch	33°40′S 116°34′E	
Sylvania	23°35′S 120°3′E	

== See also ==
- List of pastoral leases in Western Australia
