= New Haven station (disambiguation) =

New Haven station refers to the principal railway station in New Haven, Connecticut.

New Haven station or Newhaven station may also refer to:

== Australia ==
- Newhaven Wildlife Sanctuary, formerly Newhaven Station, Northern Territory

== United Kingdom ==
- In Newhaven, East Sussex, England
  - Newhaven Harbour railway station,
  - Newhaven Marine railway station (closed)
  - Newhaven Town railway station
- Newhaven railway station (Edinburgh) (closed)
- Newhaven, a tram stop for Edinburgh Trams

== United States ==
- Union Station (New Haven), the principal train station in New Haven, Connecticut
- New Haven State Street station, a smaller train station in New Haven, Connecticut
- New Haven station (Indiana), a disused train station in New Haven, Indiana
