= John Scott Farm =

- John Scott Barn and Granary
- U.S. National Register of Historic Places
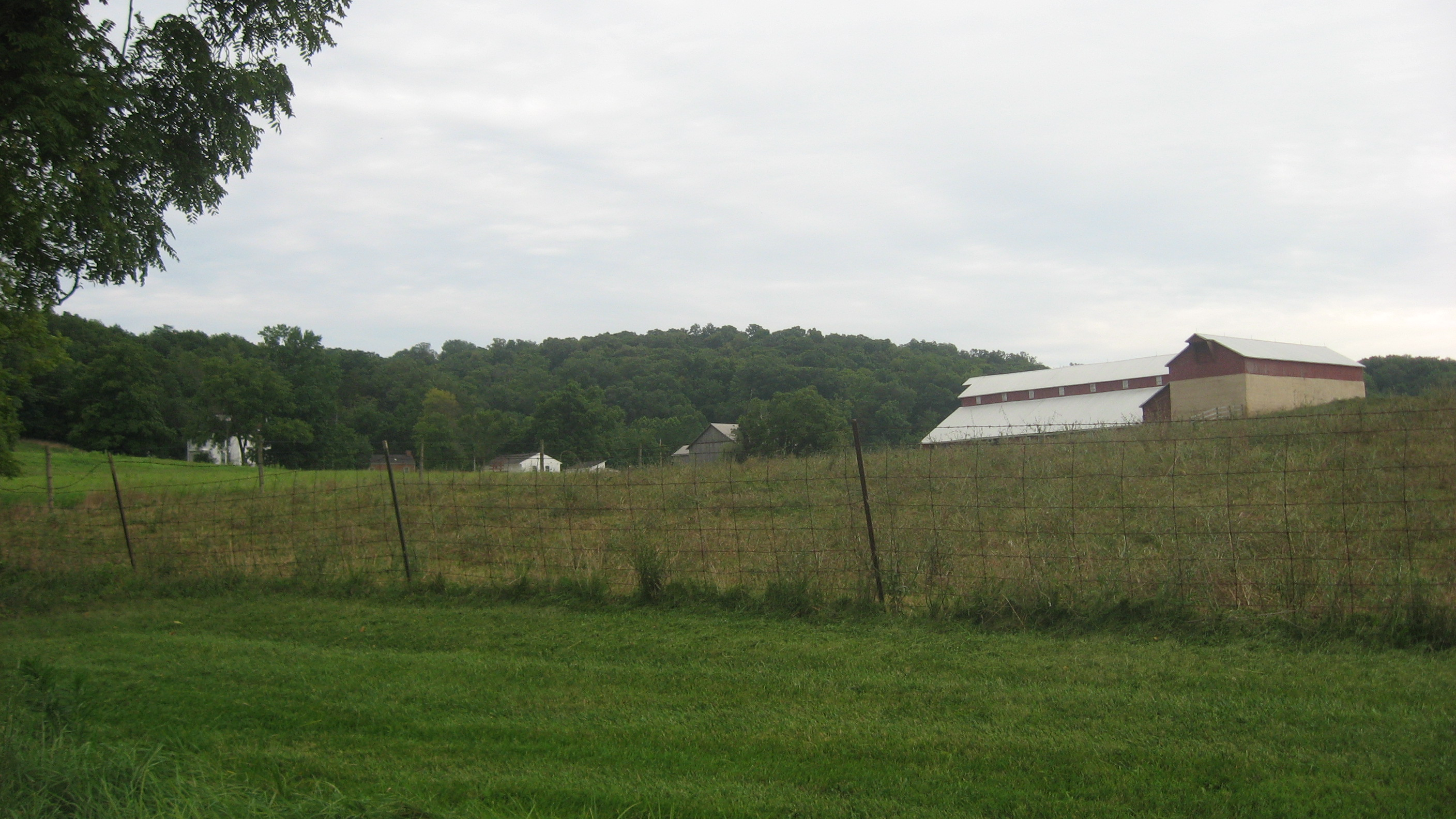
- Buildings at the farm

- Location within Ohio Location within the United States
- Location: 3681 Hamilton-New London Rd., east of Shandon, Ohio
- Coordinates: 39°19′41″N 84°41′39″W
- Area: 1.9 acres (0.77 ha)
- Built: 1875
- Architect: William Black, P.H. and John Tulley
- NRHP reference No.: 05001142
- Added to NRHP: October 4, 2005

The John Scott Farm is a historic farmstead near the community of Shandon, Ohio, United States. Established in the nineteenth century and still in operation in the twenty-first, the farmstead has been named a historic site because of its traditionally built agricultural structures.

== History ==
The farm was established in the early nineteenth century; while its precise date of establishment appears to be uncertain, it had definitely been formed by 1829, when future journalist Murat Halstead was born there. It has continued in Halstead's family since that time, taking the name of his brother-in-law John Scott, and passing through various relatives descended from Scott.

During the late nineteenth century, the farm was used for stock-raising purposes, and accordingly the barn was constructed in 1884 with a trio of concrete silos. Although the operation had been abandoned by 1895, the farm was purchased in 1900 by relatives of the Scotts, and they reopened it as a dairy farm to raise Jerseys. All three historic structures on the farmstead were built between the late nineteenth century and the early twentieth: the granary in 1875, the barn in 1884, and the milkhouse in 1915. The milkhouse was in use for a comparatively short time, being closed in the 1950s by a health board order, and an electrically powered milking facility was added to the barn at the same time.

== Buildings ==
Three buildings compose the historic section of the farmstead: a barn, a granary, and a milkhouse. These form a tight complex centered on the barn; the milkhouse is placed to the north, the granary to the east, and a family cemetery to the south. The complex sits above the valley of Paddy's Run, creating a scene that late-nineteenth-century journalists deemed more picturesque than any other farm in Butler County.

=== Barn ===
The barn is a vernacular two-story building, constructed with concrete walls on a concrete slab foundation and covered with a gabled metal roof. The floor plan is that of a simple form of the letter "T", divided into three bays on the front and six on the side. Inside, the barn relies on wooden frame construction, mixing small and large timbers. Some of the original frame was removed soon after construction, apparently because it interfered with the owner's hay storage needs. New feeding stanchions were installed soon after the farm's reopening in the early twentieth century.

=== Granary ===
One story high, the granary is a wooden frame structure on a foundation of fieldstone and a gabled metal roof. Also built in a "T" shape, the structure includes corn cribs as well as space for steam-powered grinding machinery, which was installed to simplify the process of preparing grain for consumption by cattle in the barn. The sided exterior comprises seven bays, while the interior framing features unusual timbers: the beams display evidence of being both hewn and sawn, so it appears that the builders reused framing from a previous building.

=== Milkhouse ===
The milkhouse is a smaller single-story rectangular structure with a concrete slab foundation and a gabled metal roof. Only one door pierces the walls, which are built of vermiculated and glazed brown tiles rather than metal or concrete. Inside was originally placed a concrete structure for bulk storage of milk: after milk cans would be placed in the structure, spring water would be poured among them in order to keep the milk cool.

== Preservation ==
In January 2003, the farm complex was recorded by the Ohio Historic Inventory, a historic preservation program of the Ohio Historical Society. Nearly three years later, it was officially named a historic site, being added to the National Register of Historic Places in October 2005; it qualified for designation based on its architecture, which was deemed important because comparatively few changes had been made since the 19th century. The farmstead also includes an archaeological site, designated 33BU85. The entire property embraces 240 acres (97 ha), or ½ square mile, although the historic site's boundaries include just 1.9 acres (0.77 ha).
