= Sun Haven (disambiguation) =

Sun Haven is a 2023 video game by Pixel Sprout Studios.

Sun Haven or Sunhaven may also refer to:

== Places ==
- Sun Haven, New Rochelle, a neighborhood in New Rochelle, New York
- Sun Haven, Florida, a place in Sarasota County, Florida
- Sunhaven Lake Park, a park in St. Petersburg, Florida
- Sun Haven Valley Holiday Park, at Mawgan Porth in Cornwall, England
- Sunhaven, a homestead in Western Australia

== Other uses ==
- Sun Haven Studios, a U.S. movie company based in Florida
- Sunhaven, a racehorse, winner of the 1967 Eclipse Stakes
- Sun Haven Lady, a character in Jake Spanner, Private Eye
