= Westhaven, California =

Westhaven, California may refer to:

- Westhaven, Fresno County, California
- Westhaven, Humboldt County, California
- Westhaven-Moonstone, California
