= New Haven Township =

New Haven Township may refer to the following places in the United States:

- New Haven Township, Gallatin County, Illinois
- New Haven Township, Gratiot County, Michigan
- New Haven Township, Shiawassee County, Michigan
- New Haven Township, Olmsted County, Minnesota
- New Haven Township, Franklin County, Missouri
- New Haven Township, Huron County, Ohio

== See also ==
- New Haven (disambiguation)
