= New Haven, Enugu State =

New Haven is one of the areas of Enugu State that was mapped out in the 1960s and grown from a residential suburb to a major commercial area especially along Chime Avenue which runs from Otigba junction on Ogui road to Emene junction on Enugu- Abakaliki Express way, the main high street.

It is the nerve centre of Enugu City and connects a number of key locations together. Enugu also has some of the richest Igbo men in Nigerian history.
