= New Haven (disambiguation) =

New Haven is a coastal city in the U.S. state of Connecticut.

Newhaven is a port town in East Sussex, England.

New Haven or Newhaven may also refer to:

== Places ==
=== United States ===
- New Haven, California, now called Alvarado
- New Haven County, Connecticut
- New Haven, Illinois
- New Haven, Indiana
- New Haven, Kentucky
- New Haven, Michigan
- New Haven, Missouri
- New Haven, New York
- New Haven, Hamilton County, Ohio
- New Haven, Huron County, Ohio
- New Haven, Pennsylvania, now part of Connellsville, Pennsylvania
- New Haven, Vermont
- New Haven, West Virginia
- New Haven, Adams County, Wisconsin
- New Haven, Dunn County, Wisconsin
- New Haven Colony, an English colonial venture in present-day Connecticut from 1637 to 1662

=== Elsewhere ===
- New Haven, Enugu, Nigeria
- New Haven, Falkland Islands
- Newhaven, Derbyshire, England, a hamlet
- Newhaven, Devon, a location in England
- Newhaven, East Sussex, England, a port town
- Newhaven, Edinburgh, Scotland
- Newhaven, Victoria, Australia
- Newhaven Wildlife Sanctuary, Northern Territory, Australia

== Other uses ==
- New Haven 600, a series of shotguns
- New Haven EP-5, electric locomotive class (1955)
- New York, New Haven and Hartford Railroad, known as the New Haven, 1872–1968
- University of New Haven, Connecticut, U.S.
- Newhaven, a bombing marking technique used by the Pathfinders
- Newhaven (horse), the 1896 Melbourne Cup winner
- Newhaven College, a school on Phillip Island, Victoria, Australia
- Newhaven F.C., a football club in Newhaven, East Sussex
- Viscount Newhaven, a title in the Peerage of Scotland
- New Haven (ship), sailed by privateer Guillaume Le Testu

== See also ==
- New Haven Township (disambiguation)
- Haven (disambiguation)
- New Haven station (disambiguation) - also includes Newhaven station
