= New Haven, Hamilton County, Ohio =

New Haven, Ohio
- Census-designated place
- Location in Hamilton County and the state of Ohio
- Coordinates: 39°16′34″N 84°44′48″W
- Country: United States
- State: Ohio
- County: Hamilton

Area
  - Total: 1.05 sq mi (2.71 km^{2})
  - Land: 1.04 sq mi (2.70 km^{2})
  - Water: 0.0039 sq mi (0.01 km^{2})
- Elevation: 561 ft (171 m)

Population (2020)
  - Total: 572
  - Density: 549.4/sq mi (212.14/km^{2})
- Time zone: UTC-5 (Eastern (EST))
  - Summer (DST): UTC-4 (EDT)
- FIPS code: 39-54684
- GNIS feature ID: 2585518

New Haven is a census-designated place (CDP) in Crosby Township, Hamilton County, Ohio, United States. The population was 572 at the 2020 census.

== History ==
New Haven was platted as a village by Joab Comstock in 1815. In the 19th century, the village had a post office, but was known as "Preston". This was necessary because there was already a New Haven in Huron County, Ohio, and the name was assigned by the first postmaster, Alexander Preston Cavender.

== Geography ==
New Haven is located in western Crosby Township, 22 miles (35 km) northwest of downtown Cincinnati and 4 miles (6 km) northeast of Harrison.

According to the United States Census Bureau, the CDP has a total area of 1.3 square miles (3.4 km^{2}), all land.

== Demographics ==
As of the census of 2020, there were 572 people living in the CDP, for a population density of 549.47 people per square mile (212.14/km^{2}). There were 254 housing units. The racial makeup of the CDP was 94.1% White, 0.2% Black or African American, 0.0% Native American, 0.2% Asian, 0.0% Pacific Islander, 0.7% from some other race, and 4.9% from two or more races. 2.3% of the population were Hispanic or Latino of any race.

There were 198 households, out of which 0.0% had children under the age of 18 living with them, 10.6% were married couples living together, 39.4% had a male householder with no spouse present, and 26.3% had a female householder with no spouse present. 56.6% of all households were made up of individuals, and 26.3% were someone living alone who was 65 years of age or older. The average household size was 1.45, and the average family size was 2.05.

0.0% of the CDP's population were under the age of 18, 68.7% were 18 to 64, and 31.3% were 65 years of age or older. The median age was 57.4. For every 100 females, there were 136.1 males.

According to the U.S. Census American Community Survey, for the period 2016-2020 the estimated median annual income for a household in the CDP was $31,750. About 33.3% of the population were living below the poverty line, including 0.0% of those age 65 or over. About 66.7% of the population were employed, and 21.4% had a bachelor's degree or higher.
