= Cache Valley Railroad =

Overview
- Parent company: Kansas City, Fort Scott and Memphis Railway
- Key people: Richard Jackson and C. F. Collins
- Founders: Richard Jackson
- Locale: Arkansas, USA
- Dates of operation: 1892–1897

Technical
- Track gauge: 3 ft 6 in (1,067 mm)
- Length: 19 mi (31 km)

The Cache Valley Railroad is a defunct Arkansas narrow gauge railroad which was built in the late 19th century. There is some dispute as to whether the railroad was built in 1885 or 1892 but most historians believe that the line was constructed in 1892. The railroad was a spur line of fifteen miles from the Kansas City, Fort Scott and Memphis Railway in what is now Sedgwick, Arkansas.

== History ==
Richard Jackson and his older brother James Jackson moved to Gainesville which at the time was the county seat of Greene County, Arkansas. In 1867 the two brothers formed the Jackson & Company mercantile business.

In 1882, Jackson became a land agent for the St. Louis, Iron Mountain and Southern Railway. As his business prospered, Jackson was able to acquire large tracts of timber in the Cache River bottoms. Jackson's timing was fortunate as the timber industry was just beginning in Greene County in the early 1880s. Jackson formed the Jackson Tie and Timber Company and held a contract with the Iron Mountain Railroad to produce ties and heavy bridge timbers. The Cache Valley Railroad was built primarily to transport timber from the Cache River bottoms to a connection with the Kansas City, Fort Scott and Memphis Railway Jackson, with the assistance of a St. Louis businessman named C. F. Collins, had the 15-mile narrow-gauge Cache Valley Railroad built through southwestern Greene County.

== Planned extension ==
Plans to connect the Cache Valley branch with the Helena branch of the Iron Mountain never materialized although the true purpose of the line was fulfilled and a great fortune in timber was transported by this small spur. Parts of the line were taken up as early as 1897.
