= K-65 =

K-65 may refer to:

- K-65 residues
- K-65 (Kansas highway), a highway in Kansas
- K-65 (1927–1933 Kansas highway), a former highway in Kansas
- K-65 trailer, a trailer used by the U.S. Signal Corps
