= Lake Ontario Ordnance Works =

Military installation in Niagara County, New York

- Youngstown, New York in United States
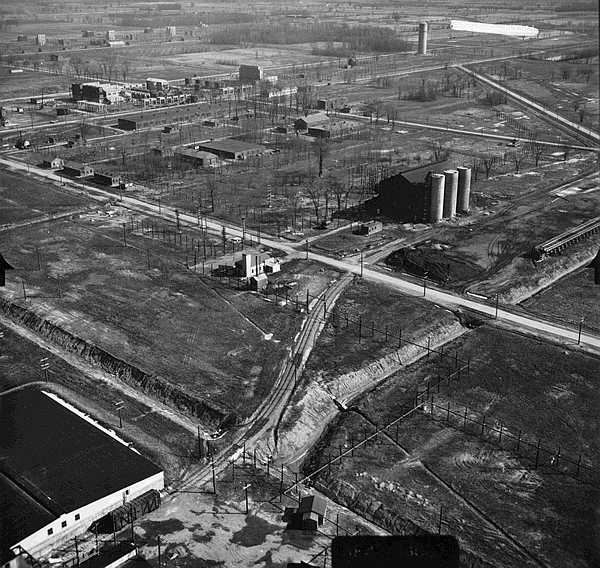
- Lake Ontario Ordnance Works in 1941

Site information
- Owner: United States Army Corps of Engineers

Location
- Location within New York Location within the United States
- Coordinates: 43°13′39″N 78°58′35″W
- Height: 315 feet (96 m)

Site history
- Built: 1941
- Built by: United States Department of War
- In use: 1941–1948
- Events: World War II, Cold War, Manhattan Project
- Geographic Names Information System

The former Lake Ontario Ordnance Works (LOOW) was a 7,500-acre (3,000 ha) military installation located in Niagara County, New York, United States, approximately 9.6 mi (15.4 km) north of Niagara Falls.

The property was purchased by the War Department during World War II as a location for the production of TNT. Most of the LOOW property was sold after the war.

The United States Department of Energy currently owns 191 acres (77 ha) of the original LOOW property, on which the Niagara Falls Storage Site (NFSS) is located. The NFSS is used for the storage of radioactive materials produced during the development of America's first atom bombs.

Approximately 93 percent of the original LOOW site—currently occupied by homes, a school, a campground, the Basilica of the National Shrine of Our Lady of Fatima, farms, local and federal government operations, and a toxic waste facility—meets the criteria of a Formerly Used Defense Site, and one portion of the property is listed as a Superfund cleanup site.

== History ==
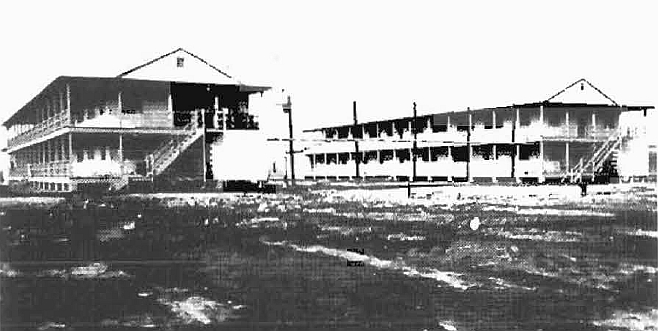
Dormitories at the LOOW, 1943

The War Department purchased 7,500 acres (3,000 ha) of farmland east of Youngstown, New York, in 1941 as a location to manufacture TNT. The location was selected because of its proximity to chemical manufacturing plants, to Fort Niagara, to the New York Central Railroad, and to water and electrical power.

The LOOW headquarters were at first located in a vegetable canning factory at the site.

The 149 private landowners living there—mostly farmers and orchard growers—were given 30 days to move out, and most of their 125 farmhouses and 538 barns were torn down or burned. Some homes located on the periphery of the LOOW boundary were kept.

Construction of the TNT plant began in January 1941, and employed over 7,500 workers. The production and storage areas occupied approximately 2,500 acres (1,000 ha) near the center of property, and the remaining 5,000 acres (2,000 ha) was undeveloped and used as a "buffer zone". A hospital, dormitories, fire department, power plant, USO hall, water supply system, and waste treatment facility were located at the LOOW, and TNT was manufactured for about 9 months, until the plant was decommissioned in 1943.

Uranium used to produce the first atom bombs from 1942 to 1948 was processed by Linde Air Products in nearby Tonawanda, and in 1944, the Manhattan Engineer District began using the LOOW site for the storage and transshipment of radioactive residues and wastes created through the processing of uranium ore at Linde.

The War Assets Administration had by 1948 sold or transferred 6,000 acres (2,400 ha) of the original property, and the remaining 1,500 acres (610 ha) were given to the newly formed Atomic Energy Commission.

More than 1,300 acres (530 ha) were sold or transferred between 1955 and 1975, although the area on which the Niagara Falls Storage Site is located remained in the possession of the U.S. government.

== Buildings and operations ==
=== Building 401 ===
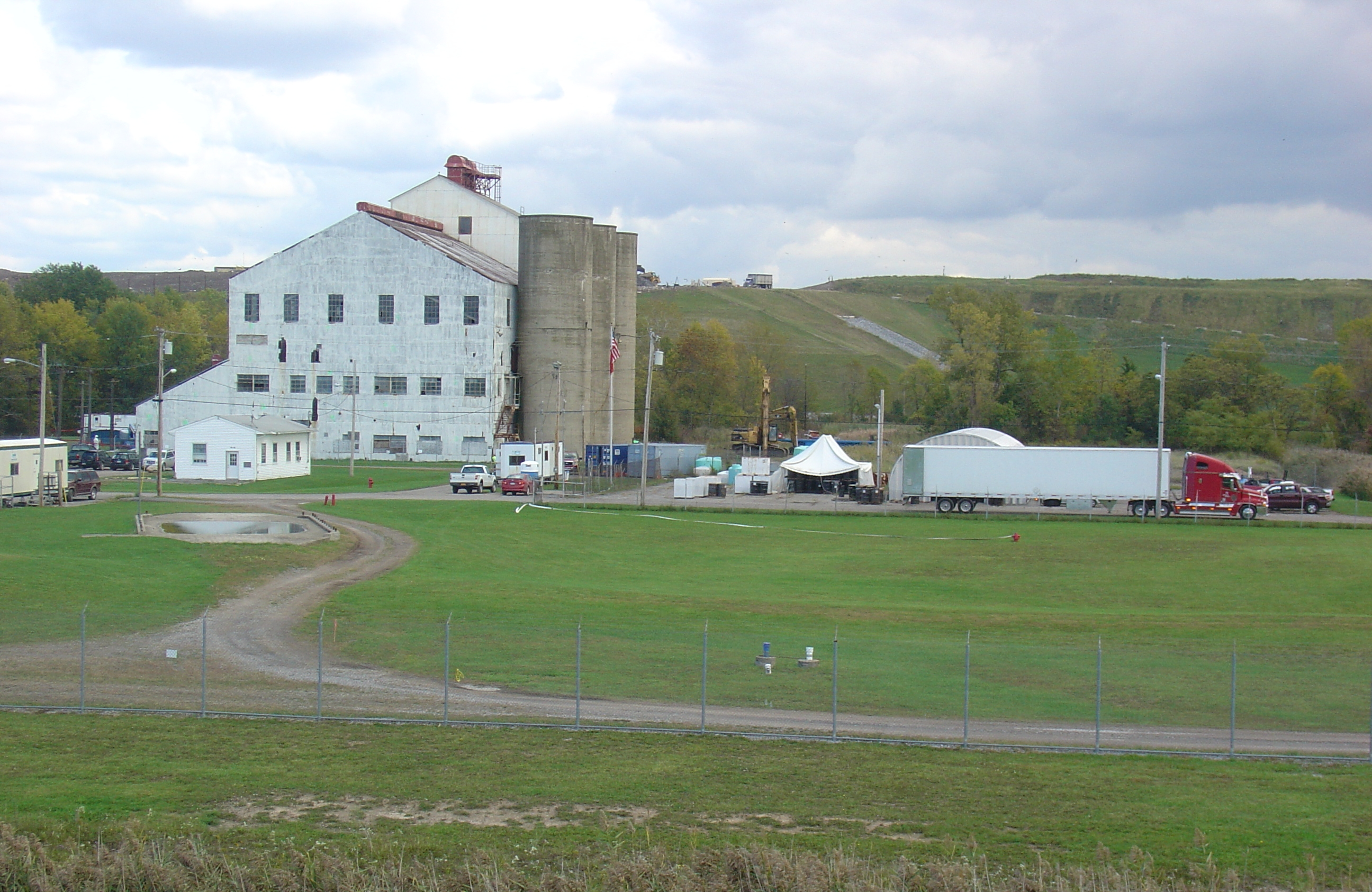
Building 401 prior to demolition in 2010. The three silos were built to resemble a barn from the air.

Beginning in 1943, Building 401 was used as the powerhouse for the production of TNT, though operations lasted less than a year. Building 401 was renovated, and from 1953–59 and 1965–71, it was used as a Boron-10 isotope separation plant. The interior of Building 401 was gutted in 1971, and its hardware and instrumentation were disposed of. Building 401 was demolished in 2010.

=== Concrete silo ===
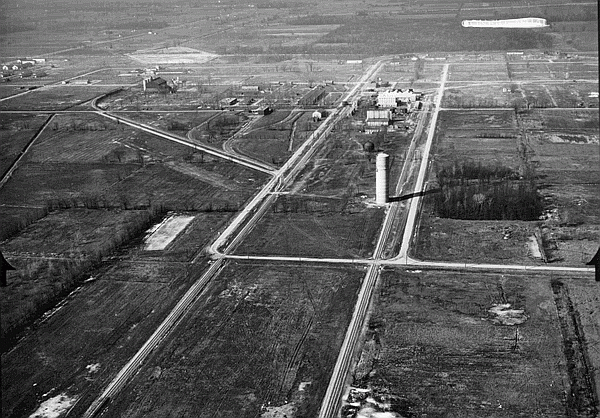
Looking west, 1941. The concrete silo is in the center of the photograph.

A 166 ft (51 m) concrete silo was erected within the east boundary of the LOOW, immediately next to Porter Center Road, which was publicly accessible. A fence with signs warning of "radioactive material" ran next to the road. In 1952, drums containing 3,869 short tons (3,510,000 kg) of highly-radioactive K-65 residues were loaded into the silo. The concrete silo was dismantled sometime after 1979.

=== Interim waste containment structure ===
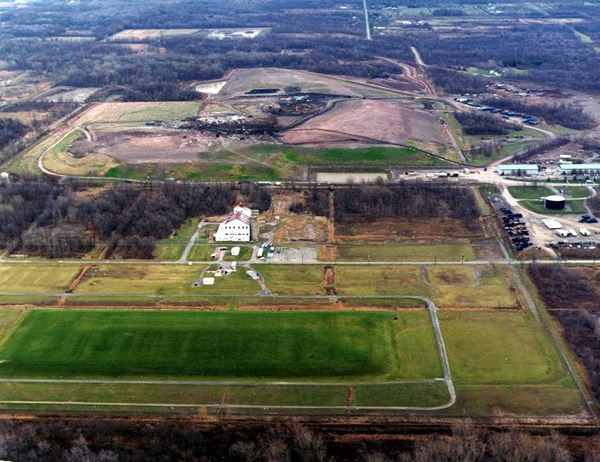
Looking east, 2002. From foreground to background are the interim waste containment structure, the former Building 401, and the Modern Disposal Residential landfill.

Construction of the interim waste containment structure was completed in 1991, and is located entirely within the Niagara Falls Storage Site. The 10-acre (4.0 ha) mound is used for the storage of radioactive waste and residues, and the grass-covered "interim cap" is designed to retard both rainwater infiltration and radon emission.

All of the contaminated and radioactive materials stored at the former LOOW site—including thorium, uranium, and the world's largest concentration of radium-226—were placed into the structure.

=== Rochester Burial Site ===
In 1951, laboratory waste and animals that had been injected with plutonium during experiments at the University of Rochester were shipped to the LOOW site for burial.

=== US Army operations ===
The United States Army was given an 860-acre (350 ha) parcel of land from the original LOOW property, located on the northeast boundary. Beginning in 1957 it housed 36 Nike surface-to-air missiles intended to protect the nearby Niagara Hydroelectric Power Project. The property is currently licensed to the New York Army National Guard, and is used as a weekend training site.

=== US Air Force operations ===
A 98-acre (40 ha) parcel of land from the original LOOW property was given to the United States Air Force, on which they located an experimental rocket fuel plant called the Youngstown Test Annex Site.

=== Private waste treatment facilities ===
- Hooker Chemical Company purchased a large portion of the original LOOW property from a private landowner in 1975 to use as a dump site.
- Waste Management, Inc currently owns and operates a 713-acre (289 ha) treatment, storage, disposal, and recovery facility near the center of the former LOOW property. It is the only hazardous waste landfill remaining in the Northeastern United States, and was the location where the anthrax-contaminated desk of news-anchor Tom Brokaw was disposed of in 2001.
- Modern Disposal Services operates a landfill on the former LOOW property.

=== Other uses ===
Approximately 380 private residences and a mobile home park are located within the footprint of the former LOOW site. A school, several small farms, a 13-acre (5.3 ha) campground, and the Basilica of the National Shrine of Our Lady of Fatima, which attracts thousands of visitors annually, are also located in the former LOOW site.

== Safety concerns ==
In 1981, the New York State Assembly Task Force on Toxic Substances wrote that the LOOW was "born in the crisis of war", and that:

Federal mismanagement at the site was manifested by sloppy and deficient record-keeping procedures, inadequate mapping of buried wastes, and technological primitivism with regard to waste storage and removal. Moreover, it is clear that the site should never have been chosen for the storage of radioactive materials in the first place.

The report added that radioactive waste had been stored "in rusting barrels stacked along the roadside".

Author Ginger Strand wrote about the LOOW in her 2008 book Inventing Niagara: "the Army Corps engineers, currently charged with the cleanup, readily admit they don't know everything that went on there".

An extensive study conducted by the United States Army Corps of Engineers concluded in 2014 that there was "no evidence of potential source areas or releases of contamination to groundwater, surface water, or soil associated with any of the ground disturbances evaluated" at the former LOOW site.

Currently, approximately 7,000-acre (2,800 ha) or 93 percent of the original LOOW site meets the criteria of a Formerly Used Defense Site, making it eligible for environmental restoration funds available from the U.S. Army. One portion of the property containing contaminated groundwater is listed as a Superfund cleanup site.

A 2005 article in the Niagara Gazette alleged that radiation at the site was causing an ongoing hazard for the nearby Lewiston-Porter Central School District.
