= Richard Jackson =

Richard Jackson may refer to:

== Arts and entertainment ==
- Richard Jackson (theatrical producer) (born 1932), British theatrical producer and agent
- Richard Jackson (musicologist) (born 1936), American musicologist and music librarian
- Richard Jackson (artist) (born 1939), American contemporary artist
- Richard Jackson (choreographer) (born 1979), American choreographer
- Richard Lee Jackson (born 1979), American actor
- Richard Jackson, Australian pianist, winner of a David Paul Landa Memorial Scholarship for Pianists in 2002

== Politicians ==
- Richard Jackson (Sudbury MP) (1688–1768), British MP for Sudbury in 1734
- Richard Jackson (colonial agent) (c. 1721–1787), British lawyer, colonial agent and politician
- Richard Jackson (Coleraine MP) (c. 1729–1789), Irish politician, MP for Coleraine 1751–1789
- Richard Jackson Jr. (1764–1838), United States Representative from Rhode Island
- Sir Richard Downes Jackson (1777–1845), Administrator of Canada West and Canada East, 1841–1842
- Richard Jackson (Liberal politician) (1850–1938), British Member of Parliament for Greenwich, 1906–1910
- Richard E. Jackson (born 1945), first African American mayor of a city in New York State and former New York State Commissioner of Motor Vehicles

== Science ==
- Richard Jackson (biochemist), biochemist and cell biologist
- Richard H. Jackson (geographer) (born 1941), geography professor at Brigham Young University

== Sportsmen ==
=== Association football ===
- Dick Jackson (c. 1878–?), English footballer and manager
- Richard Jackson (footballer, born 1900) (1900–?), English footballer for Rotherham
- Richard Jackson (footballer, born 1980), English footballer for Derby County

=== Other sports ===
- Dick Jackson (baseball) (1897–1939), American baseball player
- Rich Jackson (born 1941), American football player
- Richard Jackson (cricketer) (born 1979), English cricketer
- Rick Jackson (born 1989), American basketball player

== Others ==
- Richard Henry Jackson (1830–1892), Irish-born American general
- Richard H. Jackson (1866–1971), admiral in the United States Navy
- Sir Richard Jackson (police officer) (1902–1975), Assistant Commissioner of the London Metropolitan Police, 1953–1963
- R. M. Jackson (Richard Meredith Jackson, 1903–1986), British jurist and legal scholar
- Richard Jackson (bishop) (born 1961), Church of England Bishop of Hereford

== See also ==
- Ricky Jackson (disambiguation)
- Richie Jean Jackson (1932–2013), American author, teacher, and civil rights activist
