= Fort Scott =

Fort Scott may refer to any of five places for which General Winfield Scott, former General-in-Chief of the U.S. Army, was namesake:

- Fort Scott, Kansas, a city that grew up around a military fort of the same name
  - Fort Scott National Historic Site
- Fort Scott (Flint River, Georgia), a small fortification on the Flint River near the Georgia/Florida border, built in 1816 as a staging base for operations against Creek and Seminole Indians operating in western Spanish Florida; see First Seminole War
- Fort Scott (Arlington, Virginia), a small fortification in Arlington, Virginia, built to defend Washington during the American Civil War
- Fort Winfield Scott, a coast artillery post created within the Presidio of San Francisco in 1912
- Fort Point, San Francisco, renamed Fort Winfield Scott in 1882 but reverted to the original name before the establishment of the coast artillery post

== See also ==
- Fort Scott Camp
