= K-65 residues =

Type of Uranium waste from the Manhattan Project

K-65 residues are the very radioactive mill residues resulting from the uniquely concentrated uranium ore discovered before WW II in Katanga province (Shinkolobwe mine) of the Democratic Republic of the Congo (formerly Belgian Congo).

According to Zoellner, "Remnants from typical uranium from the southwestern United States give a radioactive signature of about forty picocuries per gram, about ten times the amount of picocuries per liter of air that is considered safe for humans to breathe. The Shinkolobwe remnants, by contrast, emit a stunning 520,000 picocuries per gram." The Linde Air Products Company and Electro Metallurgical plant near Niagara Falls built the ring-and-plug in Little Boy. Linde Air used the Lake Ontario Ordnance Works site at the end of the war to dispose of its atomic waste, cuttings from the African uranium, some 200 dump trucks' worth. The eventual location of all this waste is called the "Interim Waste Containment Structure" of the Niagara Falls Storage Site of the U.S. Army Corps of Engineers.

This ore, dubbed "K-65", had a record 65% uranium content. It also held very high concentrations of thorium and radium (and their decay products, including radon gas) which are retained in the tailings (residues). The very high concentrations of these extremely toxic, long-lived radionuclides present in these wastes prompted the National Academy of Sciences' National Research Council to categorize them as indistinguishable in hazard from High-Level Waste in its 1995 report, "Safety of the High-Level Uranium Ore Residues at the Niagara Falls Storage Site, Lewiston, New York" .

The K-65 ores were refined as a key part of the Manhattan Project during World War II at the Linde Ceramics Plant at Tonawanda, NY, and at the Mallinckrodt Chemical Works in St. Louis, MO; these ores were the primary raw material source of ~80% of the uranium used in the Hiroshima bomb. The Mallinckrodt "K-65 residues" were later moved to the Feed Materials Production Center, a Cold War era uranium refinery at Fernald, OH (outside of Cincinnati) which commenced operations in 1951. The refining of "K-65" ore was continued at Fernald. The Linde "K-65 residues" were transported to a storage silo built at the federally appropriated Lake Ontario Ordnance Works site outside of Lewiston, NY, a short distance from Niagara Falls, NY.
