= Ricky Jackson =

Ricky, Rickey, or Rick Jackson may refer to:

- Ricky Jackson (Australian footballer), Australian rules footballer
- Ricky Jackson (rugby union) (born 1998), New Zealand rugby union player
- Ricky Jackson (miscarriage of justice) (born 1957), African American wrongfully convicted of murder
- Rickey Jackson (born 1958), American football linebacker
- Rick Jackson (born 1989), American basketball player
- Rick Jackson (businessman), American businessman and candidate for governor of the U.S. state Georgia

== See also ==
- Richard Jackson (disambiguation)
