= Fernald Feed Materials Production Center =

Uranium fuel factory in Ohio, U.S.

Coordinates: 39°17′53″N 84°41′27″W

- Superfund site
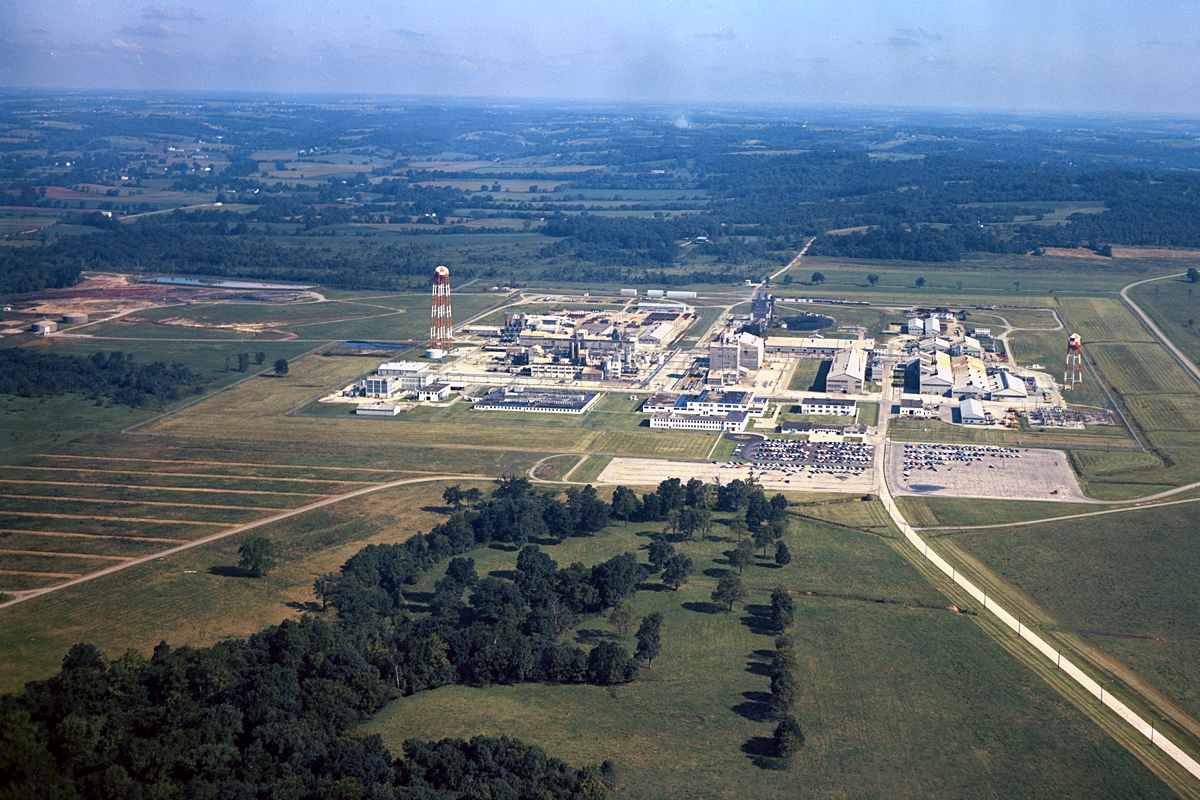
- Aerial view of the Fernald Feed Materials Production Center

- Location within Ohio Location within the United States
- Location: Fernald, Butler and Hamilton, Ohio

Information

Progress
- Proposed: 14 July 1989
- Listed: 21 November 1989
- Construction completed: 20 December 2006

The Fernald Feed Materials Production Center (commonly referred to simply as Fernald) is a Superfund site located within Crosby Township in Hamilton County, Ohio, and Ross Township in Butler County, Ohio, in the United States. The plant was located near the rural town of Fernald, about 20 miles (32 km) northwest of Cincinnati, Ohio, and occupied 1,050 acres (420 ha).

Fernald was a facility which refined uranium for the U.S. nuclear weapons production complex from 1951 to 1989. During that time, the plant produced 170,000 metric tons of metal products and 35,000 metric tons of compounds, such as uranium trioxide and uranium tetrafluoride. Annual production rates ranged from a high in 1960 of 10,000 metric tons to a low in 1975 of 1,230 metric tons. Refining uranium metal required chemical and metallurgical processes that occurred in nine specialized plants at the site.

Fernald came under criticism in 1984 when it was learned that the plant was releasing millions of pounds of uranium dust into the atmosphere, causing radioactive contamination of the surrounding areas. It was listed as a Superfund site in 1989. Cleanup of the surface areas was completed in October 2006, and the site became the Fernald Preserve in 2007.

== Background ==
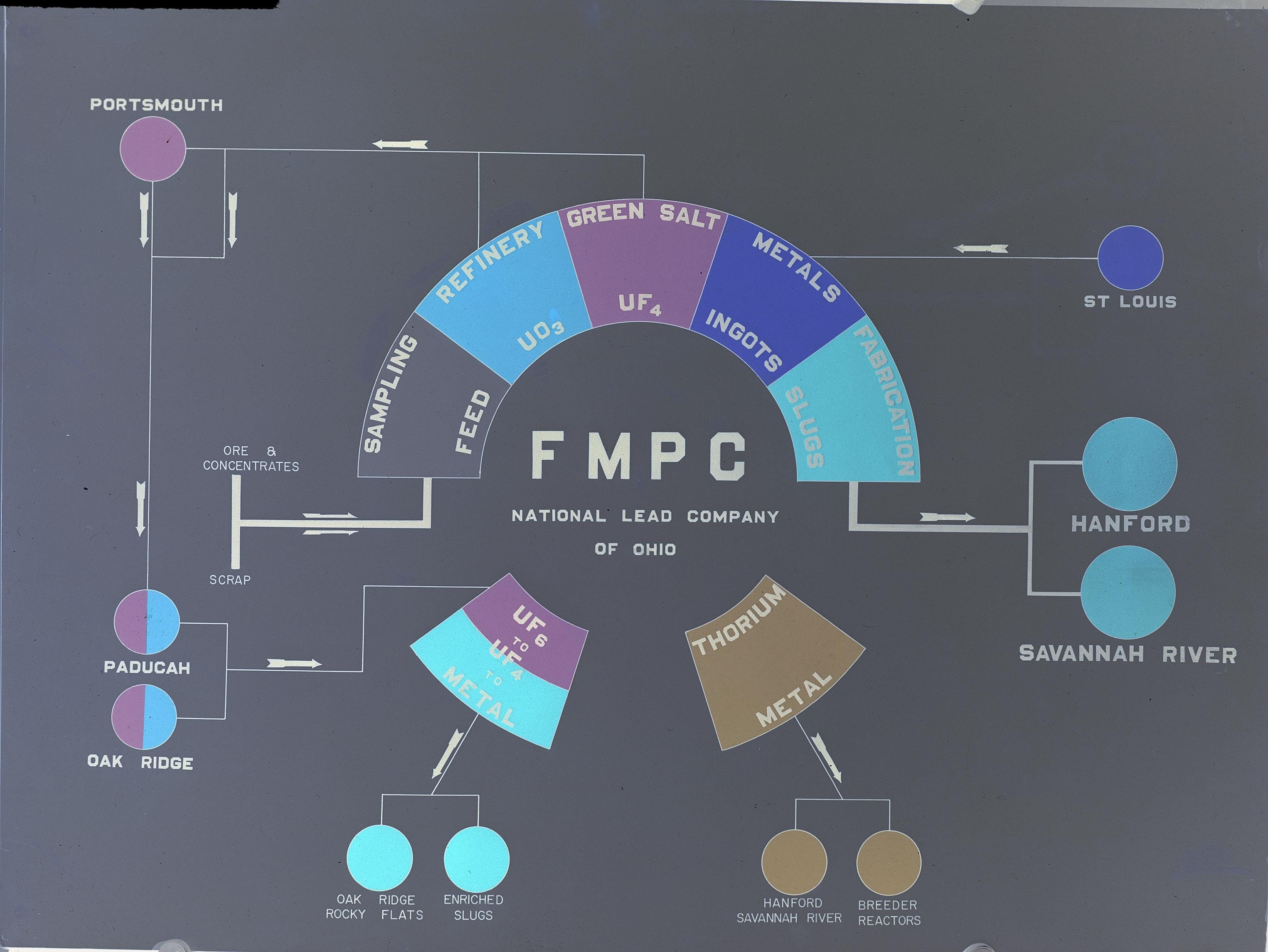
Role of Fernald Feed Materials Production Center

On 1 January 1947, the Atomic Energy Commission (AEC) assumed responsibility for the research and production facilities the Army's Manhattan Project had created during World War II to make the first atomic bombs. The AEC's gaseous diffusion plants at Oak Ridge produced enriched uranium and its production reactors at the Hanford Site irradiated uranium to breed plutonium for nuclear weapons.

During the war, the Manhattan Project feed materials program had employed different companies in widely separated cities to produce the feed materials for the production processes. In the early post-war period, the Mallinckrodt Chemical Works in St. Louis turned uranium ore into uranium dioxide (UO_{2}, known as "brown oxide"); the Harshaw Chemical Company in Cleveland turned brown oxide into uranium tetrafluoride (UF_{4}, known as "green salt") and uranium hexafluoride (UF_{6}); and Union Carbide's Electro-Metallurgical Division plant in Niagara Falls, New York, turned green salt into uranium metal. The AEC also operated storage facilities in Cleveland and at the Middlesex Sampling Plant in Middlesex, New Jersey.

In 1949, the AEC commissioners gave some thought to consolidating these feed materials facilities. Aside from the practical issues of moving material about the country, there were security concerns that the Union Carbide plant was too close to the Atlantic Ocean and the border with Canada. The Mallinckrodt facility in St. Louis was better situated from a security point of view, but there were already many defense plants in the vicinity, and too many could make an inviting target for enemy bombers. There were similar concerns about Hanford and Oak Ridge, but the AEC decided to proceed with expansion of their facilities. However, when Mallinckrodt opened a new plant in 1949, the AEC decided to cease using the Niagara Falls plant to produce uranium metal.

In response to the Soviet Union's detonation of an atomic bomb on 29 August 1949, and the outbreak of war in Korea on 25 June 1950, the AEC embarked on a major expansion program. New facilities included a lithium-6 enrichment plant at Oak Ridge; gaseous diffusion plants at Oak Ridge, Paducah, Kentucky and Portsmouth, Ohio; weapons component plants at Rocky Flats and Amarillo; two "Jumbo" production reactors at the Hanford Site; and five new production reactors at Savannah River Site. To relieve the burden of increased production on Mallinckrodt, and aware that its aging facilities might become less efficient and more unhealthy in the future, Walter J. Williams, the AEC's Director of Production, revived the idea of a consolidated feed materials plant. In October 1950, he authorized the AEC's New York Operations Office to design a new feed materials plant that would carry out all phases of uranium processing work. The new plant was to be up and running by 1 January 1953.

== Site selection ==
The New York Operations Office delegated the task of finding a suitable location for the new feed materials plant to the Catalytic Construction Company, its engineering contractor. A series of selection criteria was drawn up. At least 1 square mile (640 acres; 260 ha) of flat land was required, preferably already owned by the government, serviced by good road and rail connections. The plant needed 30,000 kW of electric power and a stream with a flow of at least 500 cubic feet per second (14 m^{3}/s) to remove effluent. Ideally, the local area would have sufficient skilled tradesmen to avoid having to build a camp for the construction workers and sufficient accommodation to avoid having to build a new housing development for the plant workers. The preferred zone was the Ohio valley and the southeastern states.

The United States Army Corps of Engineers nominated twenty inactive ordnance or chemical works sites, but almost all were liable to be reactivated in response to the Korean War emergency. The only one that was not was the AEC-owned Lake Ontario Ordnance Works in Niagara County, New York, which was outside the preferred zone. The criteria were reconsidered. The recent development of a new ion-exchange process for the treatment of radioactive waste water allowed the water flow requirement to be halved, but in the interim the AEC had become more concerned about the housing situation, and expressed a strong preference for a site near a major city. In January 1951, another thirty-four sites were considered, most of which were recommended by ten railroads in the region. The following month, the water flow criterion was further reduced to 100 cubic feet per second (2.8 m^{3}/s), and another eight sites were nominated by railroads. Catalytic Construction Company engineers physically inspected the sites. This reduced the candidates to four in the Ohio-Indiana area. After consideration of freight costs, labor costs and property values, the New York Operations Office manager, W. E. Kelley, chose a site near Fernald, Ohio.

Fernald was a rural town about 20 miles (32 km) northwest of Cincinnati, Ohio. The 1,050-acre (420 ha) site straddled the border between Hamilton and Butler counties; most of the site was in the former but about 200 acres (81 ha) was in the latter. The majority of residents relied upon wells or cisterns for their water, many farms lacked electricity, and numerous roads were narrow and unsealed. The site was chosen because it was between the uranium ore delivery ports of New York and New Orleans, and it was accessible to the other main AEC sites via the Chesapeake and Ohio Railway, which passed through Fernald on the way to Chicago, and multiple highways. It was close to Cincinnati, where there was a sizeable labor force and ample housing for the technical personnel, who would have to be drawn from other parts of the country. Electricity was available from Cincinnati Gas & Electric. The landscape was level, making the site's construction easy, and its isolation provided safety and security. It was located above the Great Miami aquifer, which supplied the water needed for uranium metal processing.

== Construction ==
James F. Chandler, an Army Corps of Engineers officer, was recruited as the AEC area manager, and established his office in downtown Cincinnati. The Corps of Engineers set about acquiring the land in March 1951. Seven parcels were purchased outright. The government offered the owners between $375 and $652 per acre (equivalent to $4,651 to $8,087 in 2025). Allowances were made for crops that had already been planted. Three owners refused, arguing that the government's offer was too low, considering the rich soil and easy access to markets. The AEC then instituted condemnation proceedings. On 24 April, Justice John H. Druffel of the United States District Court for the Southern District of Ohio in Cincinnati signed a decree granting the AEC immediate possession of their properties. The owners were given thirty to sixty days notice to vacate. The project was not a secret; the front page of the 31 March 1951 edition of The Cincinnati Times-Star announced that the AEC was planning to "build a $3 million uranium ore refining plant near Fernald."

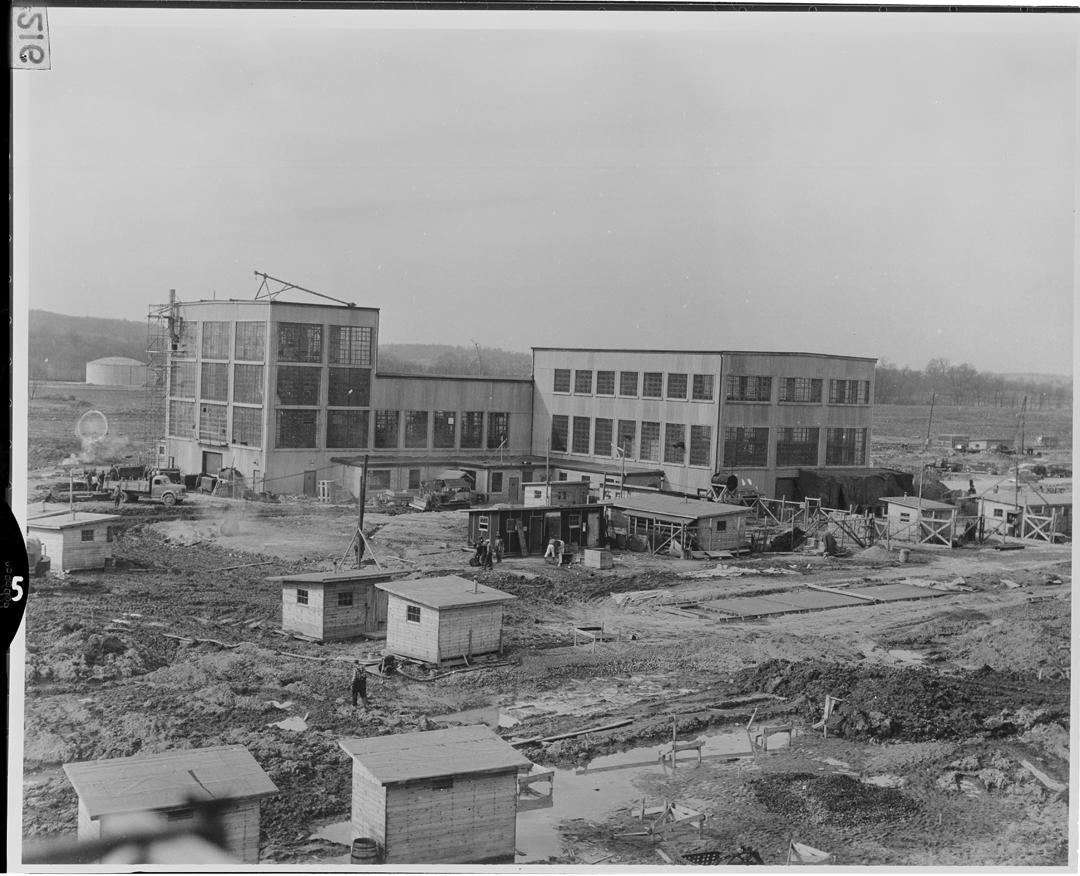
Pilot Plant under construction

The construction contract for the Fernald Feed Materials Production Center (FMPC) was awarded to the George A. Fuller Company, with the Catalytic Construction Company acting as engineer/architects. To expedite the process Fuller was instructed to commence when the design reached the 70% complete stage. Ground was broken in May 1951. The production area encompassed 136 acres (55 ha), of which 19 acres (7.7 ha) was under cover. Works included moving 2,600,000 cubic yards (2,000,000 m^{3}) of earth, laying 4 miles (6.4 km) of railroad tracks and building 24 acres (9.7 ha) of paved roads and storage areas.

Startup and testing operations processes began as soon as each plant was completed. The first was the Pilot Plant, which commenced operation in October 1951. It was followed by the Plant 6 in the summer of 1952, Plant 5 in May 1953, Plants 1, 2/3 and 4 in the fall of 1953, and finally Plants 7 and 9 by the fall of 1954. The contract for operation of the plant was awarded to the National Lead Company of Ohio in 1951, which was best known for its Dutch Boy Paint brand. It remained the operator until 1 January 1986, when the Westinghouse Electric Corporation took over. In 1991, Westinghouse renamed the subsidiary that operated Fernald as the Westinghouse Environmental Management Company of Ohio (WEMCO). On 1 December 1992, the Fernald Environmental Restoration Management Corporation (FERMCO) assumed responsibility for the site.

== Production ==
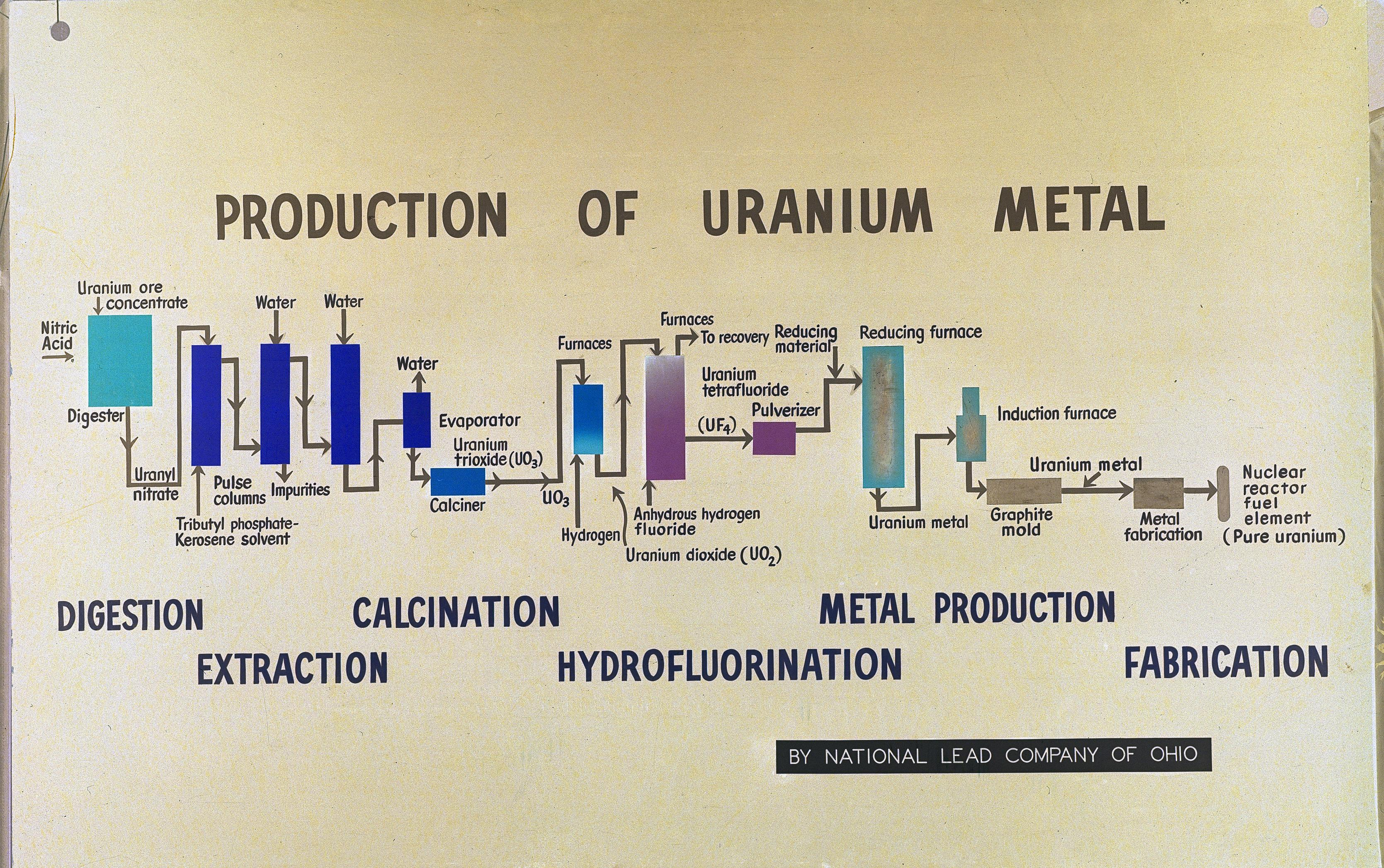
Production process

From 1951 to 1989, Fernald converted uranium ore into metal, and then fabricated this metal into target elements for nuclear reactors. Annual production rates ranged from a high in 1960 of 10,000 metric tons to a low in 1975 of 1,230 metric tons. Refining uranium metal required chemical and metallurgical processes that occurred in nine specialized plants on the site. The FMPC also served as the country's central repository for another radioactive metal, thorium. Between 1954 and 1975, the FMPC occasionally produced small quantities of thorium metal in Plant 8, Plant 9 and the Pilot Plant.

=== Plant 1 ===
The production process at the FMPC began at Plant 1, also known as the Sampling Plant. The Sampling Plant weighed, sampled, classified and sorted representative samples of the incoming ore concentrates. Ore suppliers were paid based on the ore's uranium content. The Sampling Plant had over 19,045 square metres (205,000 sq ft) of storage space, of which 3,879 square metres (41,750 sq ft) was under cover.

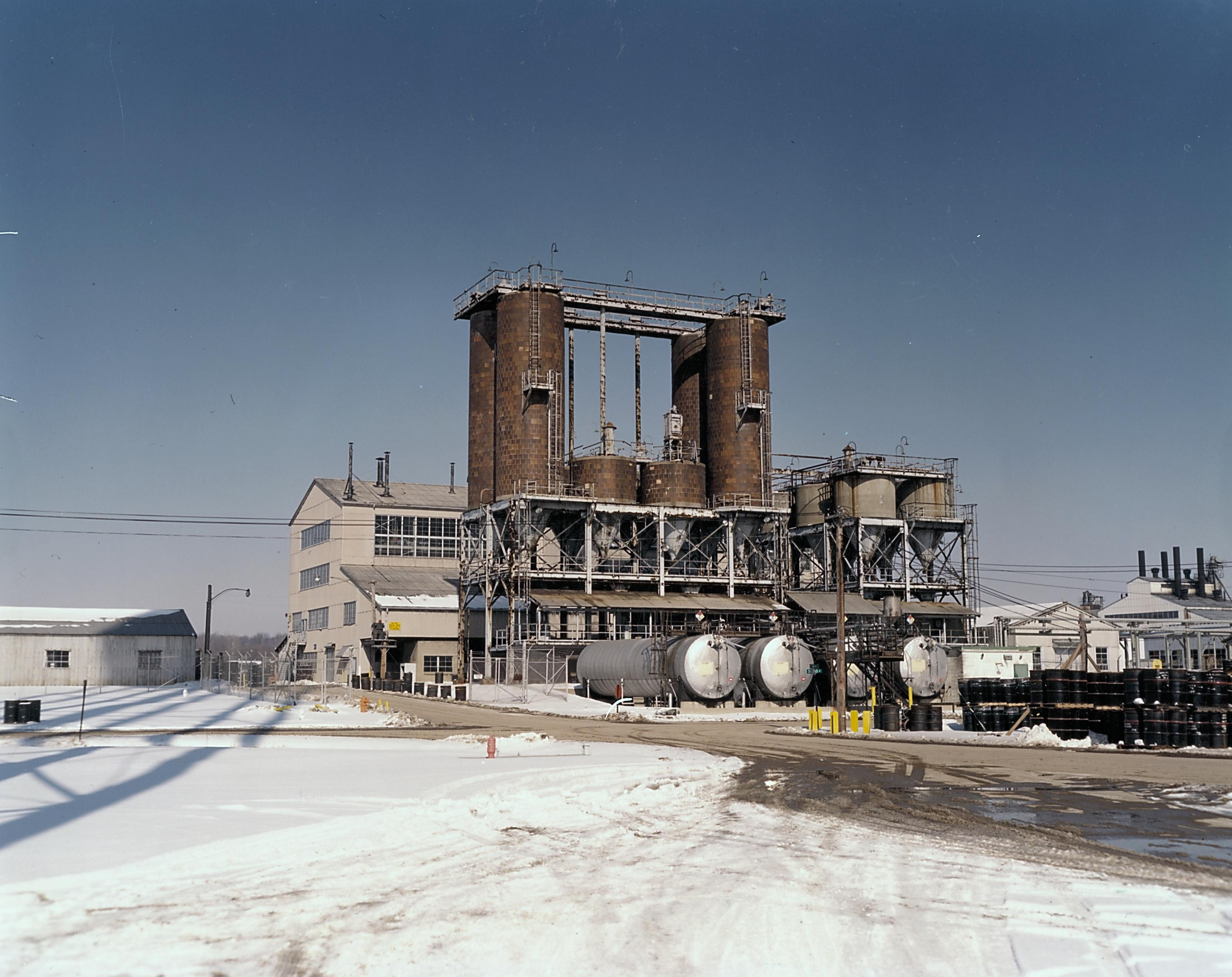
Plant 1 - silos and uranyl nitrate storage tanks

The plant was divided into two main processing lines, one for Q-11 and one for INX. Q-11 was the term used to refer to radium-bearing ores primarily mined in the Belgian Congo while INX was a non-radium concentrate. The problem with handling radium bearing ores was that one of radium's daughter particles is radon, an invisible radioactive gas. Materials were dried, crushed and milled. The Sampling Plant had a capacity of 9.1 metric tons per hour.

In addition to sampling incoming ores the plant reconditioned 30-and-55-US-gallon (110 and 210 L) drums used to transport and store radioactive materials onsite. Reconditioned drums were inspected for holes or dents that could cause failure, and those that failed inspection were scrapped.

=== Plant 2/3 ===
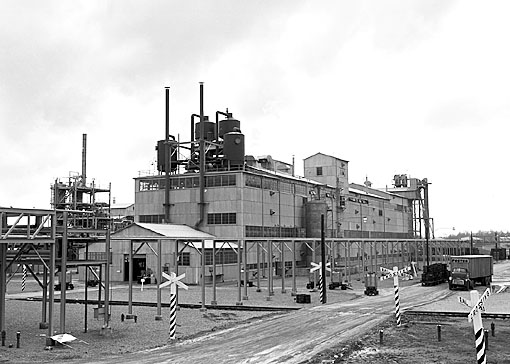
Fernald FMPC Plants 2 & 3, the Ore Refinery Plants

Plant 2/3 was known as the Ore Refinery & Denitration Plant. It was called Plant 2/3 because the two separate functions occur in the same building. Here uranium was recovered from feed materials (i.e., ores, concentrates and residues) and converted to concentrated uranium trioxide (UO_{3}), also called "orange salt". In addition to uranium, the Ore Refinery was capable of extracting and purifying other materials. The Ore Refinery consisted of three major process stages: digestion (Plant 2), extraction and denitration (Plant 3).

The digestion stage involved dissolving the uranium ore or scrap in large steel tanks of nitric acid (HNO_{3}). This formed a slurry of insolubles, uranyl nitrate (UO_{2}(NO_{3})_{2}) and nitric acid. For the extraction stage, the FMPC adopted a solvent extraction process developed by Harshaw that used tributyl phosphate (TBP - (CH_{3}CH_{2}CH_{2}CH_{2}O)_{3}PO) and kerosene as an organic solvent instead of diethyl ether ((CH_{3}CH_{2})_{2}O), which Mallinckrodt used in St. Louis, and which was an explosive hazard. The process at Fernald differed from that of Harshaw in that it used a series of "pulse columns" to mix and separate the uranyl nitrate and solvent. The uranyl nitrate preferentially bonded to the solvent, leaving the rest behind in what was called an aqueous raffinate. In 1970, a special digestion system was installed in Plant 1 to allow the processing of enriched uranium with a uranium-235 content of up to 5%. This used a safe-geometry system with pipes of a diameter and distance apart that rendered a criticality incident impossible.

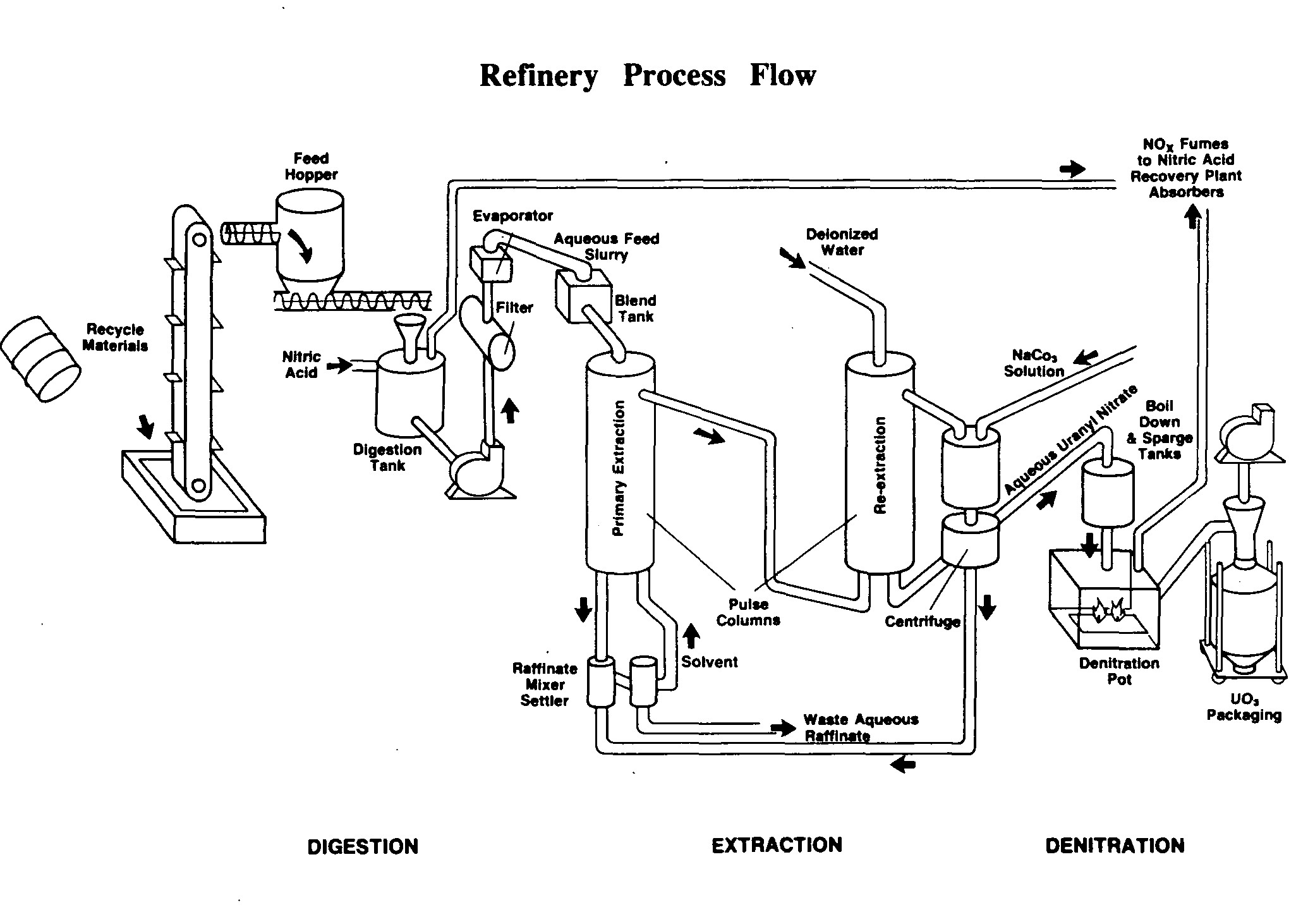
Fernald Refinery process flow

The purified uranyl nitrate was recovered by extraction with de-ionized water. In the absence of the nitric acid, the uranyl nitrate was preferentially attracted to the water. This was treated with sodium carbonate (Na_{2}CO_{3}) to remove degradation products. The purified aqueous uranyl nitrate now contained about 100 grams of uranium per liter. Boiling and evaporation then increased the concentration to 1,350 grams per liter. In the denitration stage, the aqueous solution was calcinated in 1,900 liter pots to produce orange salt. This was milled and packaged out in hoppers with a capacity of 3.6 metric tons or 55-gallon drums. The denitrification step gave off nitric oxide (NO) and nitrogen dioxide (NO_{2}), which was captured and used to produce more nitric acid. The orange salt was either sent to Plant 4 for conversion to uranium tetrafluoride (UF_{4}) for the next stage in reduction to metal or shipped to the Paducah Gaseous Diffusion Plant.

Originally designed to process 4,570 metric tons of uranium ore per annum, subsequent improvements to the plant doubled that capacity. Plant 2/3 operated from 1954 to 1962, when AEC consolidated refining operations at the Weldon Spring Site, and Plant 2/3 was placed on standby status. Over the next four years it processed scrap only, but the plant was reactivated in 1966 when the Weldon Spring Site was closed down. Operations continued until 1989, when the FMPC was shut down. Plant 2/3 was demolished in 2003.

=== Plant 4 ===
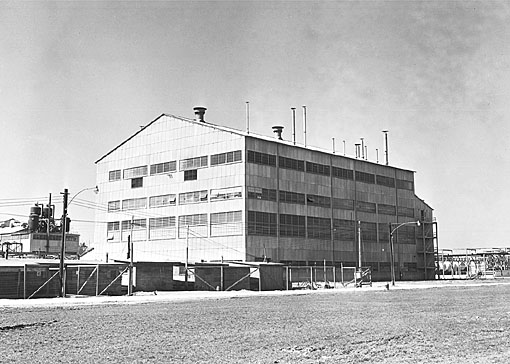
Plant 4 - Green Salt Plant

The Green Salt Plant, as Plant 4 was known, produced "green salt" (uranium tetrafluoride - UF_{4}) from uranium trioxide. Green salt was the intermediate compound used in the process of producing uranium metal, the main product of the FMPC, although it was also used to produce uranium hexafluoride (UF_{6}) for the gaseous diffusion plants.

Orange salt was received from the Refinery in mobile hoppers, and was fed into stainless steel fluidized bed reactors that were heated to 529 to 593 °C (984 to 1,099 °F). Dissociated ammonia (a mixture of H_{2} and N_{2}) was added for the hydrogen reduction of orange salt to uranium dioxide, by the reaction:

UO_{3} + H_{2} → UO_{2} + H_{2}O

The uranium dioxide was held in suspension and behaved like a liquid. The off-gases from the reduction reactors were passed to a hydrogen burner where the excess hydrogen was burned and then passed through a dust collector to remove any entrained uranium dioxide that might have been present.

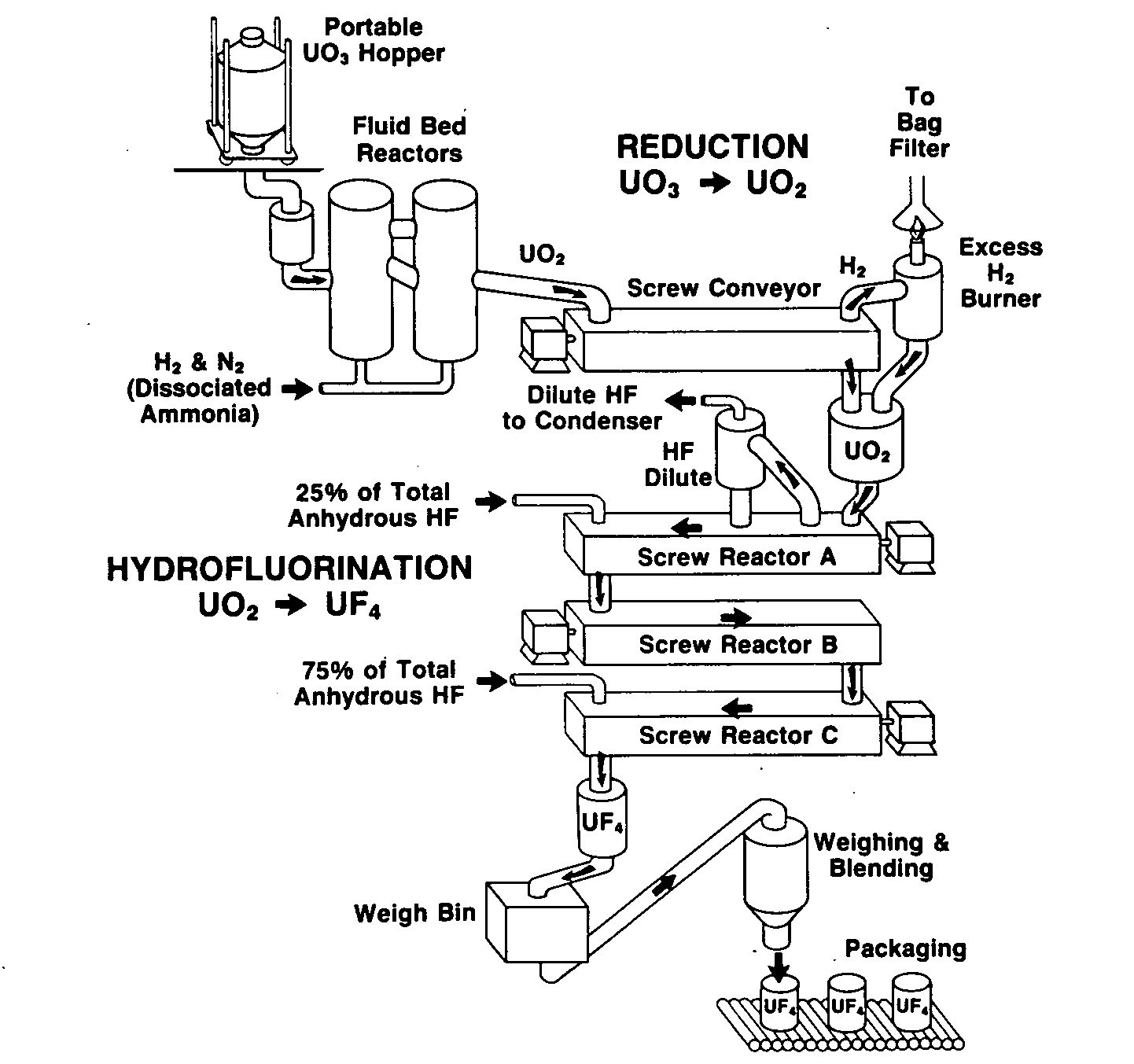
Conversion of UO_{3} to UF_{4}

The uranium dioxide in the reduction furnace passed through a seal hopper and a feed screw to the first of the three hydrofluorination furnaces. The operating temperature of each was higher than the one before, with the first operating at about 149 °C (300 °F) and the third at around 649 °C (1,200 °F).

The bed of UO_{2} was moved through the hydrofluorination furnace by screw conveyors and contacted counter-currently by hydrofluoric acid vapors for the hydrofluorination of uranium dioxide to green salt by the reaction:

UO_{2} + 4HF → UF_{4} + 2H_{2}O

The resulting product was packaged in 38-liter cans and sent to Plant 5. Excess hydrofluoric acid was collected for reuse. The vented steam was filtered to remove residual uranium compounds, which were fed back into the production system.

Plant 4 production peaked in 1958, when nearly 12,000 metric tons of uranium tetrafluoride was produced. Demand declined thereafter, and the plant operated sporadically in the 1970s. Processing was restarted in 1980 and continued until the FMPC was closed in 1989. The building was imploded in August 1996.

=== Plant 5 ===
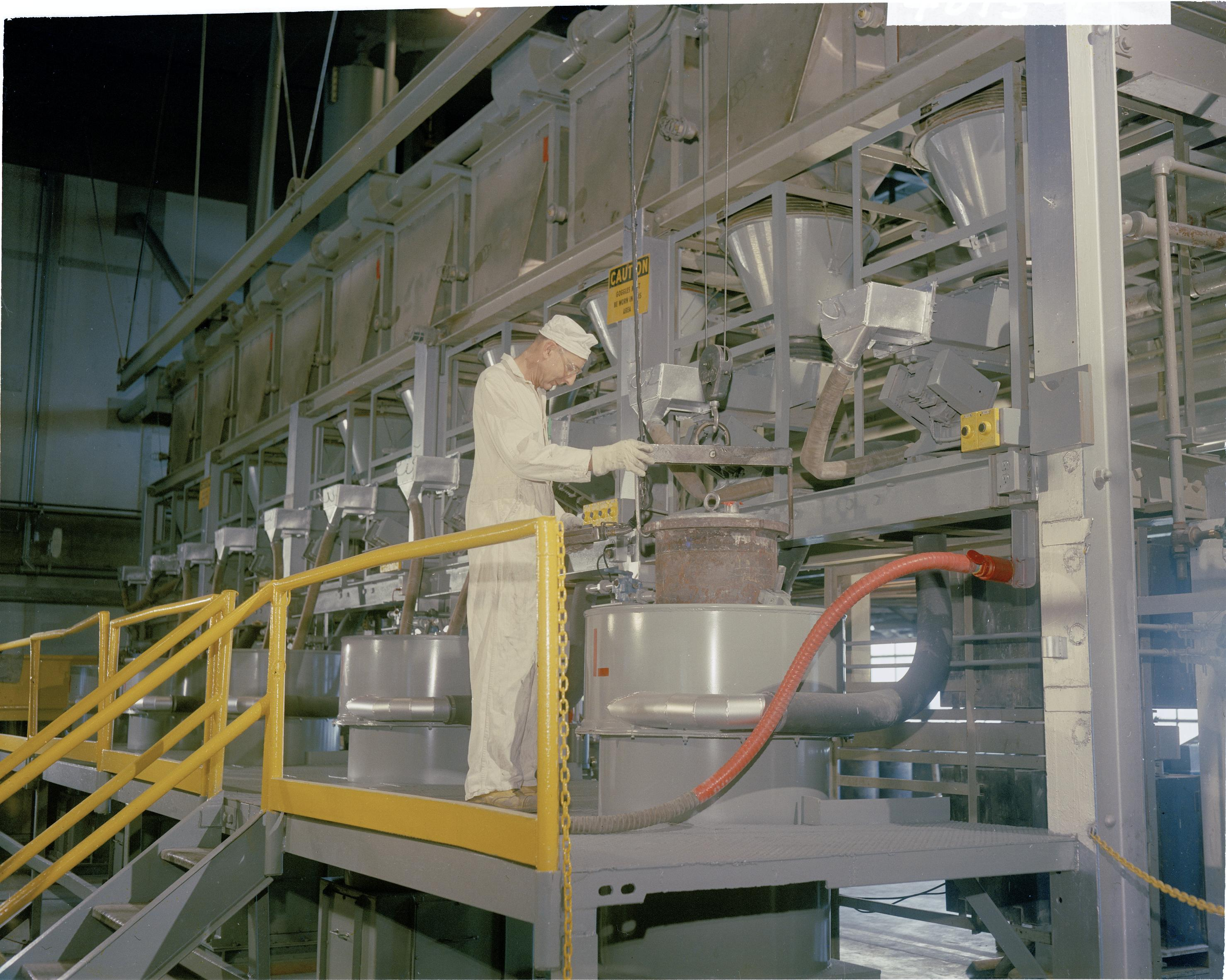
Jolter operation in Plant 5, the Metals Production Plant

Plant 5, the Metals Production Plant, was where green salt was converted into metal. The conversion of uranium tetrafluoride to metal was accomplished by the thermite reduction of green salt with magnesium in a steel-lined reaction vessel known as a "bomb". Green salt was mixed with magnesium granules and packed in the reaction pot, which was lined with magnesium fluoride slag and capped with slag. The pot was heated to 649 to 816 °C (1,200 to 1,501 °F) in a furnace. After about four hours the reaction occurs:

UF_{4} + 2Mg → 2MgF_{2} + U (metal)

During this process, the internal temperature may reach as much as 1,649 °C (3,000 °F). At least 20 minutes later, the pot was removed from the furnace and allowed to cool in air for at least an hour and then in water for a few hours. Once the pot had cooled, the solidified uranium metal, known as a "derby", was separated from the slag and liner materials in a sequence of manual and mechanical operations. The MgF_{2} slag from the breakout station was conveyed to the slag recycling plant, where it was stored awaiting processing for reuse as refractory liner. The slag recovery process consisted of crushing, pulverizing, and classifying the slag, which was then transferred back to the plant's reduction area.

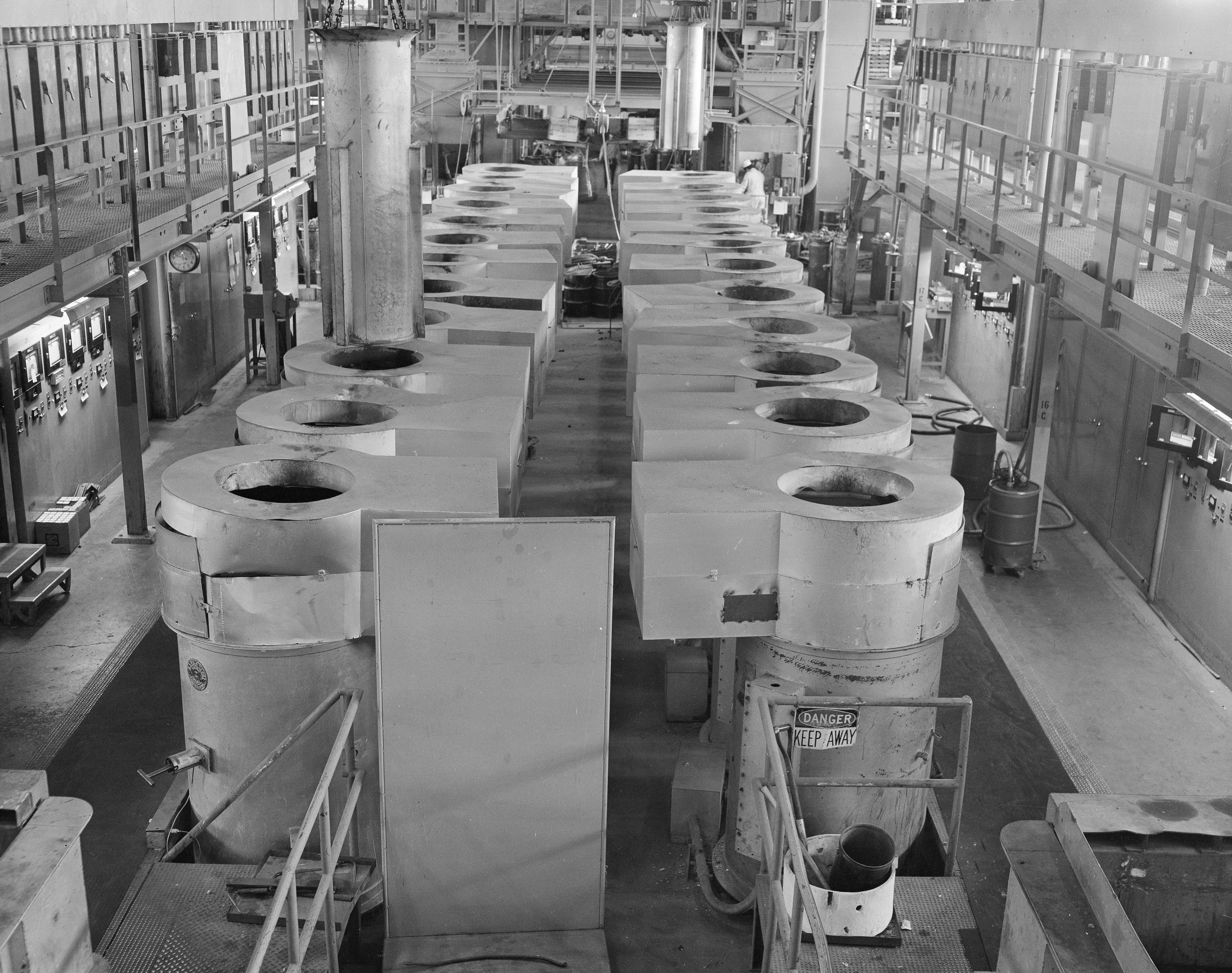
Metal reduction furnaces in Plant 5, the Metals Production Plant

Standard and depleted uranium metal derbies weighed about 168 kilograms; enriched derbies were smaller, weighing about 136 kilograms. Most derbies were transferred to the Plant 5 metal casting area or the Special Products Plant, but some were sent to other AEC sites for research purposes.

The next step in the plant consists of melting the uranium metal and casting an ingot. Graphite crucibles were loaded with a charge of derbies and solid recycled scrap. The loaded crucibles were then mechanically positioned in induction melting and casting furnaces that were designed to give a maximum of flexibility and a minimum of human exposure to radioactivity. The uranium metal was melted under high vacuum to minimize contamination of the melt with atmospheric gases and to permit purification of the metal by distillation of volatile contaminants.

The derbies were heated for a 96 minutes at 130 kilowatts until they reached 1,482 °C (2,700 °F), when the shear plug at the bottom of the crucible was removed and molten metal was poured into a graphite mold and the ingot was allowed to cool and solidify. Additional equipment was provided for the ingot to be removed from the mold, weighed, cropped, sampled, and stored for further processing in the Metals Fabrication Plant. Ingots ranged from 58.4 to 101.6 centimetres (23.0 to 40.0 in) long, and weighed up to 653 kilograms. The longer ingots were sawn in half to produce pairs of billets for extrusion at Plant 9.

=== Plant 6 ===
Plant 6 was known as the Metals Fabrication Plant. Ingots from Plants 5 and 9 were heat treated in salt water baths and quenched with oil to give them extra strength. The salt film inhibited oxidation of the surface metal. The process was devised by researchers at the AEC's Argonne National Laboratory who investigated how to protect the uranium from cracking during the rolling process.

The FMPC had the equipment for rolling, forming, and machining uranium rods and slugs, but from 1971 on from they were sent offsite to Reactive Metals Inc. (RMI) in Ashtabula, Ohio, for extrusion into tubes and rods. They were returned to Plant 6 where a lathe was used to cut the tubes and rods into the appropriate length. The tubes and rods were then stamped for identification purposes, cleaned and degreased. The finished elements were checked for quality and then packaged and shipped to the Hanford and Savannah River sites.

An inevitable part of the metal fabrication process was the creation of chips and turnings. These were collected, crushed, pickled, rinsed, dried and compacted to form briquettes, which were sent back to Plant 5 to be recycled. The plant's dust collection system also captured uranium dust particles that added up to several tons worth each year.

The Metals Fabrication Plant was demolished in 2002.

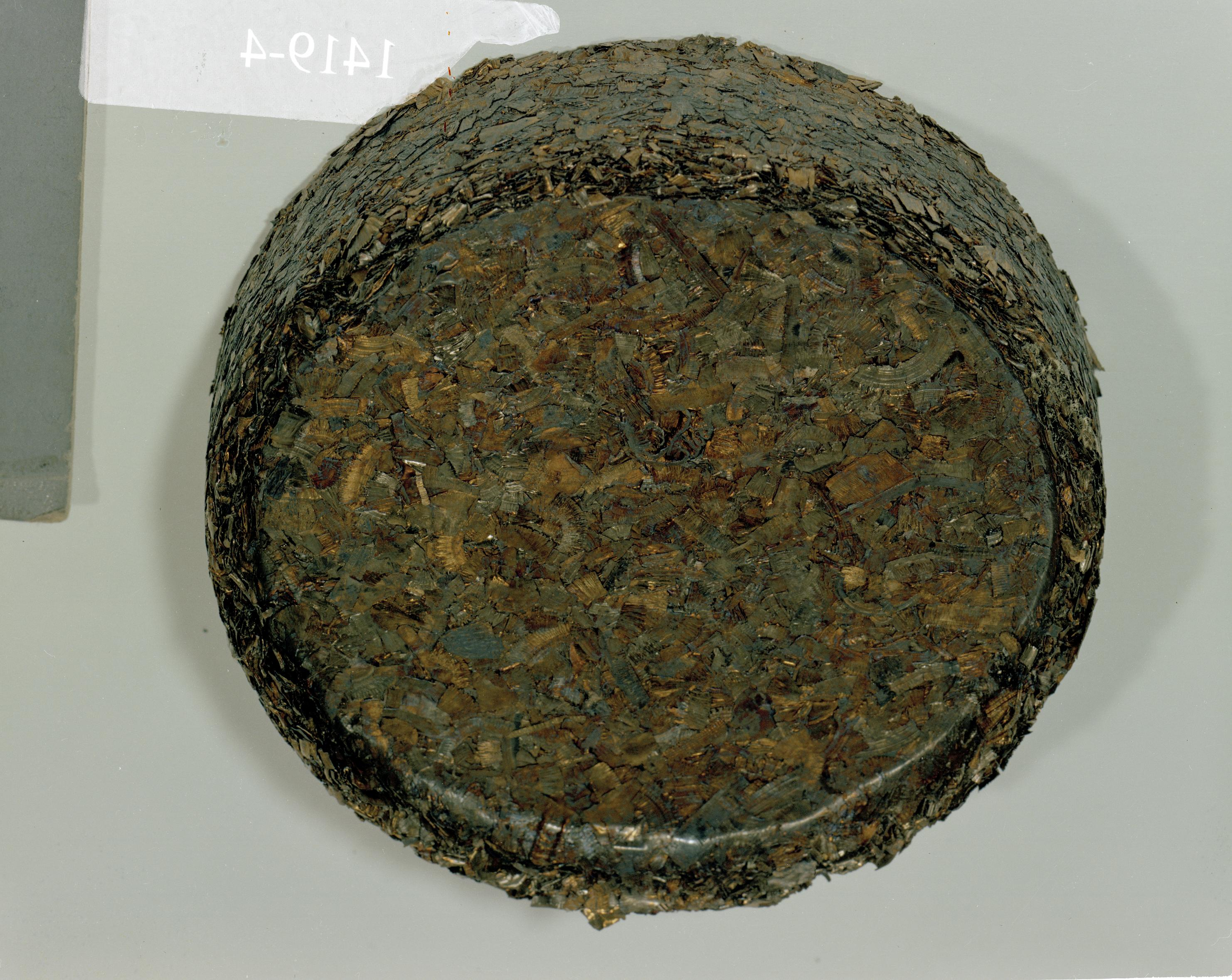
Uranium briquette

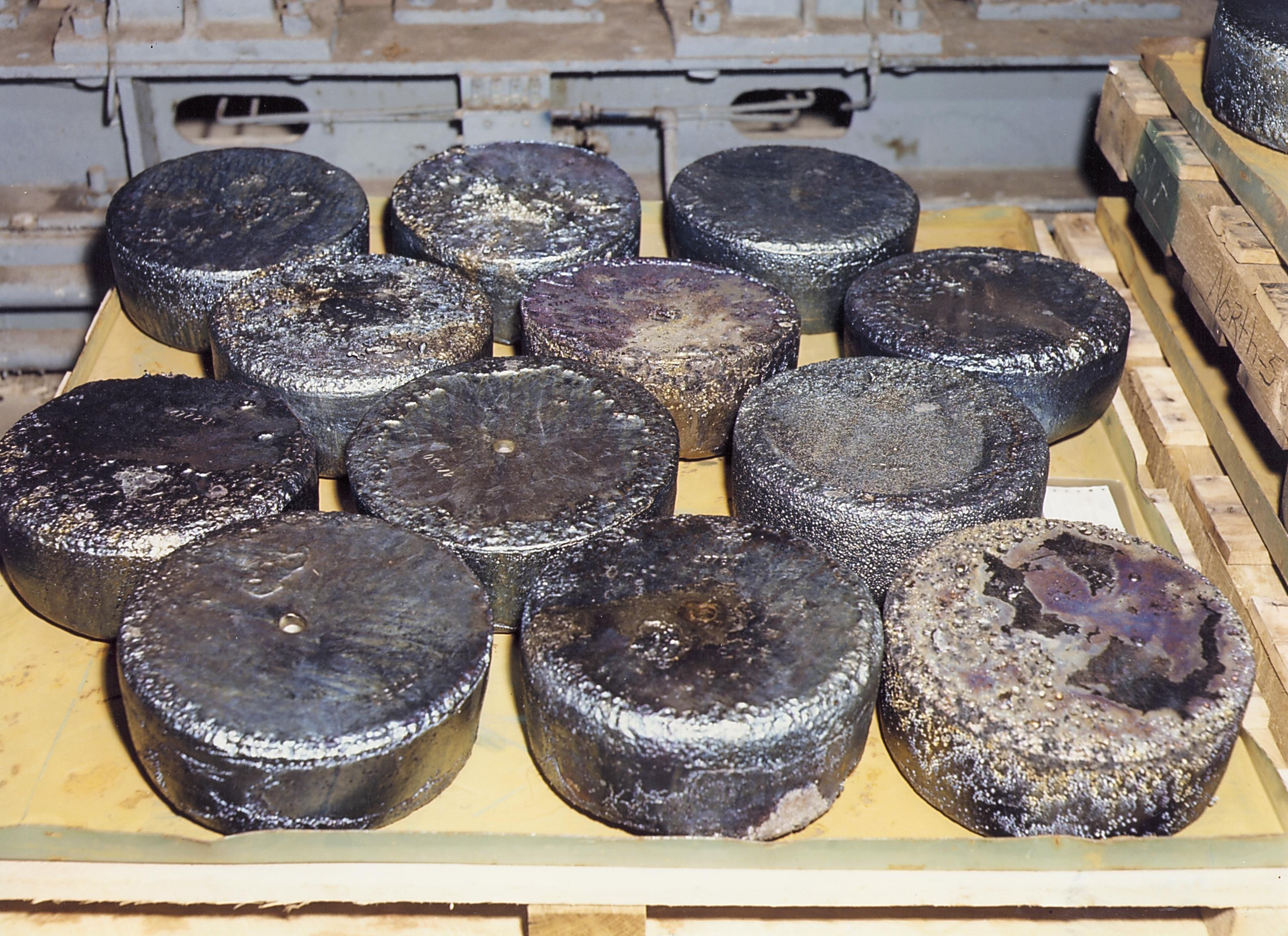
Derbies

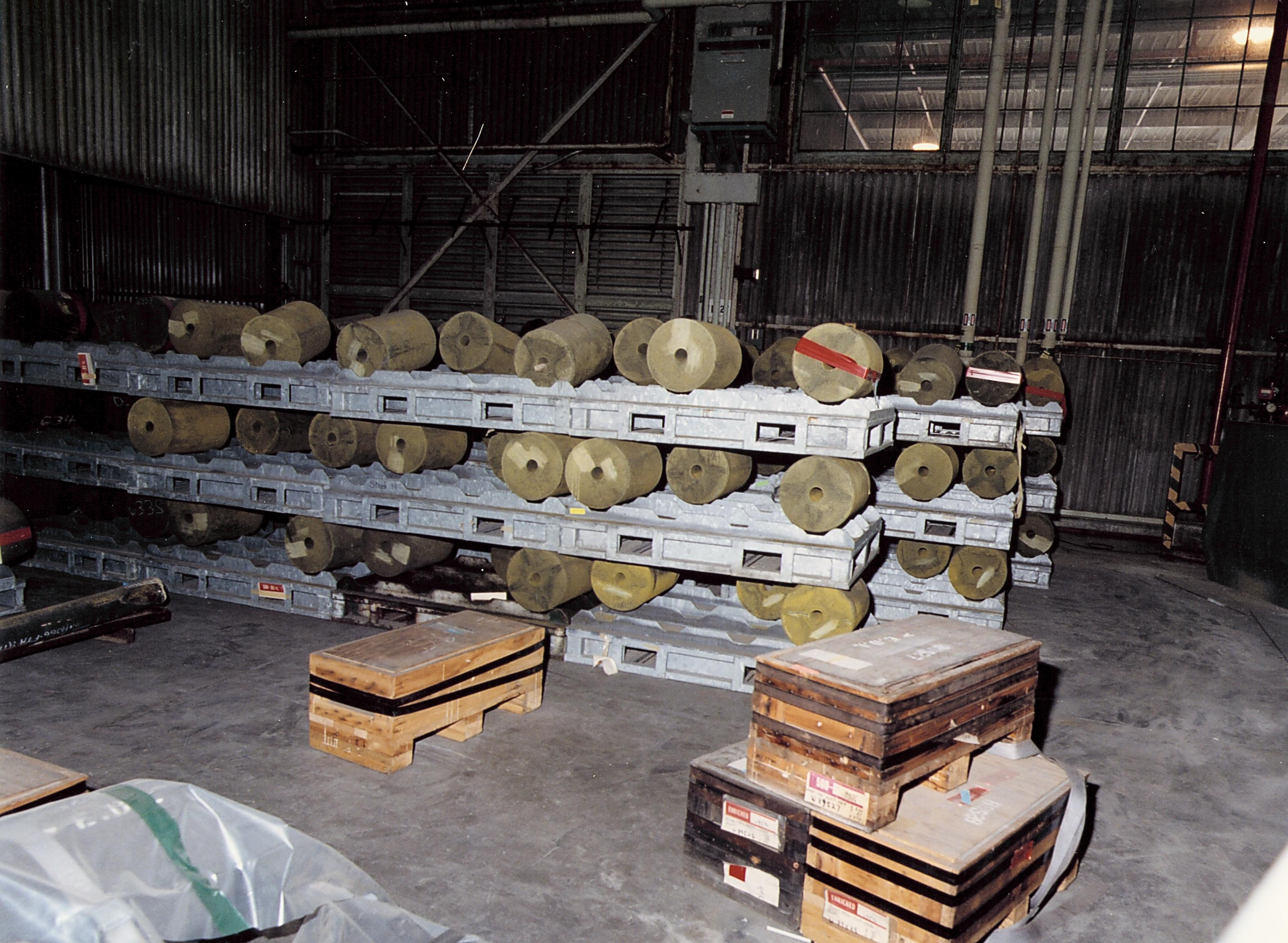
Enriched ingots

=== Plant 7 ===
Plant 7 converted uranium hexafluoride to green salt, which was used in Plant 5 to produce uranium metal. It only ran for two years, from 1954 to 1956, before it was shut down after a similar plant opened at Paducah. Plant 7 remained inactive for the next thirteen years. In 1969, the equipment was declared excess and sold off, and the building was used to store drums of green salt and empty containers. The building became the first major one at the FMPC to be demolished when it was imploded twice in 1994.

=== Plant 8 ===
Plant 8 was the Scrap Recovery Plant. Uranium materials from FMPC and off-site operations were converted to black oxide for re-processing in the Refinery. This included briquettes from Plant 6. Other operations include drum washing, filtering Refinery tailings, operation of rotary kiln, box, muffle, and oxidation furnaces, and screening of furnace products. The Scrap Recovery Plant operated on an as-needed basis in 1970s, but returned to full operations in 1980. It was closed in 1989, and the building was demolished in 2003.

=== Plant 9 ===
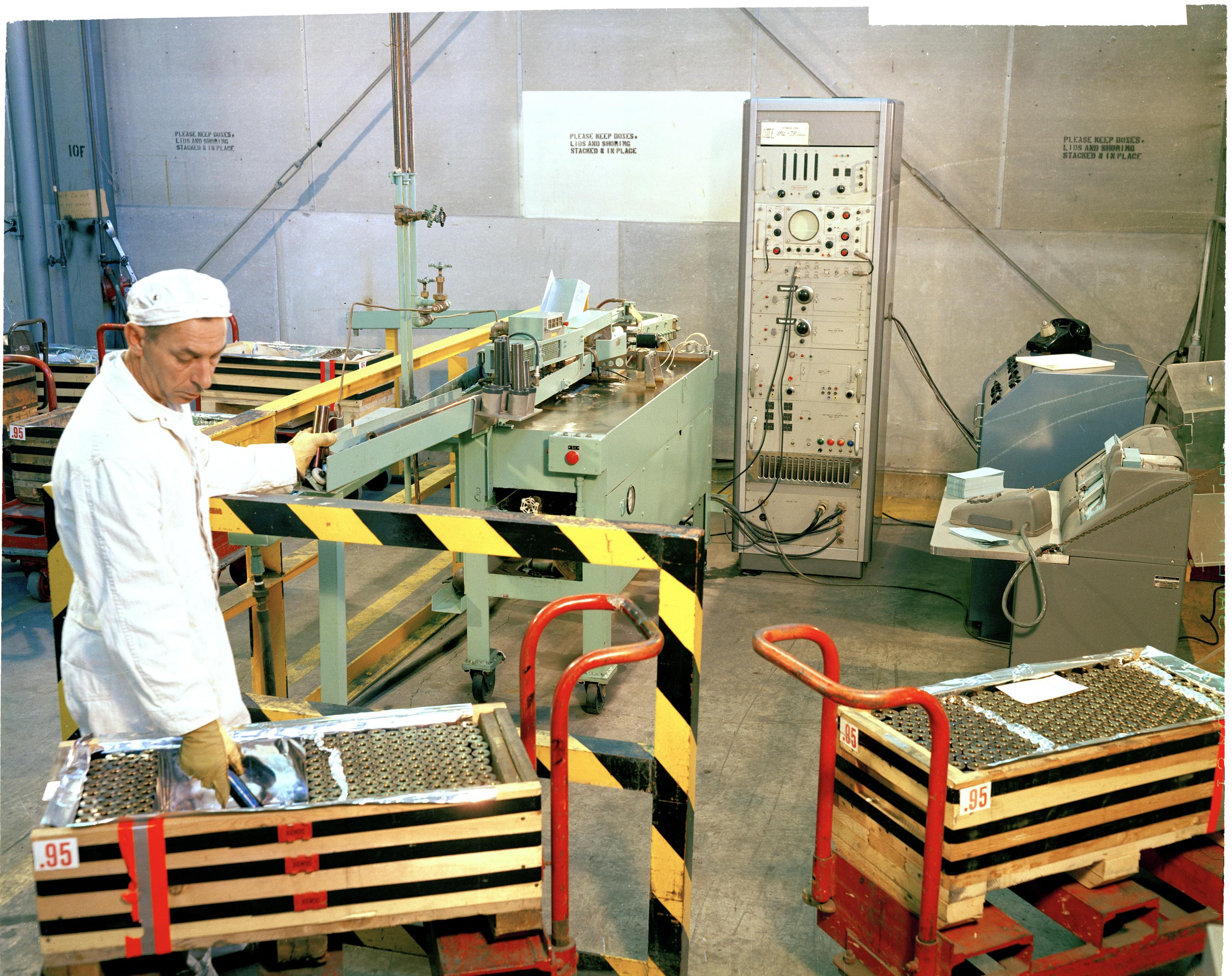
Ultrasonic testing in inspection area of Plant 9, The Special Products Plant. The fuel rods are boxed for shipment.

Plant 9, the Special Products Plant, was originally built as a plant for thorium metal production and commenced operation in October 1954. Interest in thorium declined and it was shut down in 1956. The plant was then repurposed to process slightly enriched uranium and to cast larger ingots than those produced in Plant 5. The plant contained facilities for producing derbies, ingots, slugs, and washers of various enrichments. Ingots cast at Plant 9 could be up to 33 centimetres (13 in) in diameter, 63.5 centimetres (25.0 in) long, and weigh up to 2,000 kilograms (4,400 lb). Cropped billets from Plants 5 and 9 were center drilled on a boring machine and surface machined on lathes, then sent to Plant 6 for heat treatment.

Plant 9 also performed a chemical decladding process called "Zimlo" on unirradiated fuel elements clad at the Hanford Site but then rejected. These were immersed in dilute nitric acid to remove the outer copper layer and then treated with hydrofluoric acid to remove the zircalloy-2 cladding. The uranium metal was then remelted and recast into ingots.

=== Pilot Plant ===
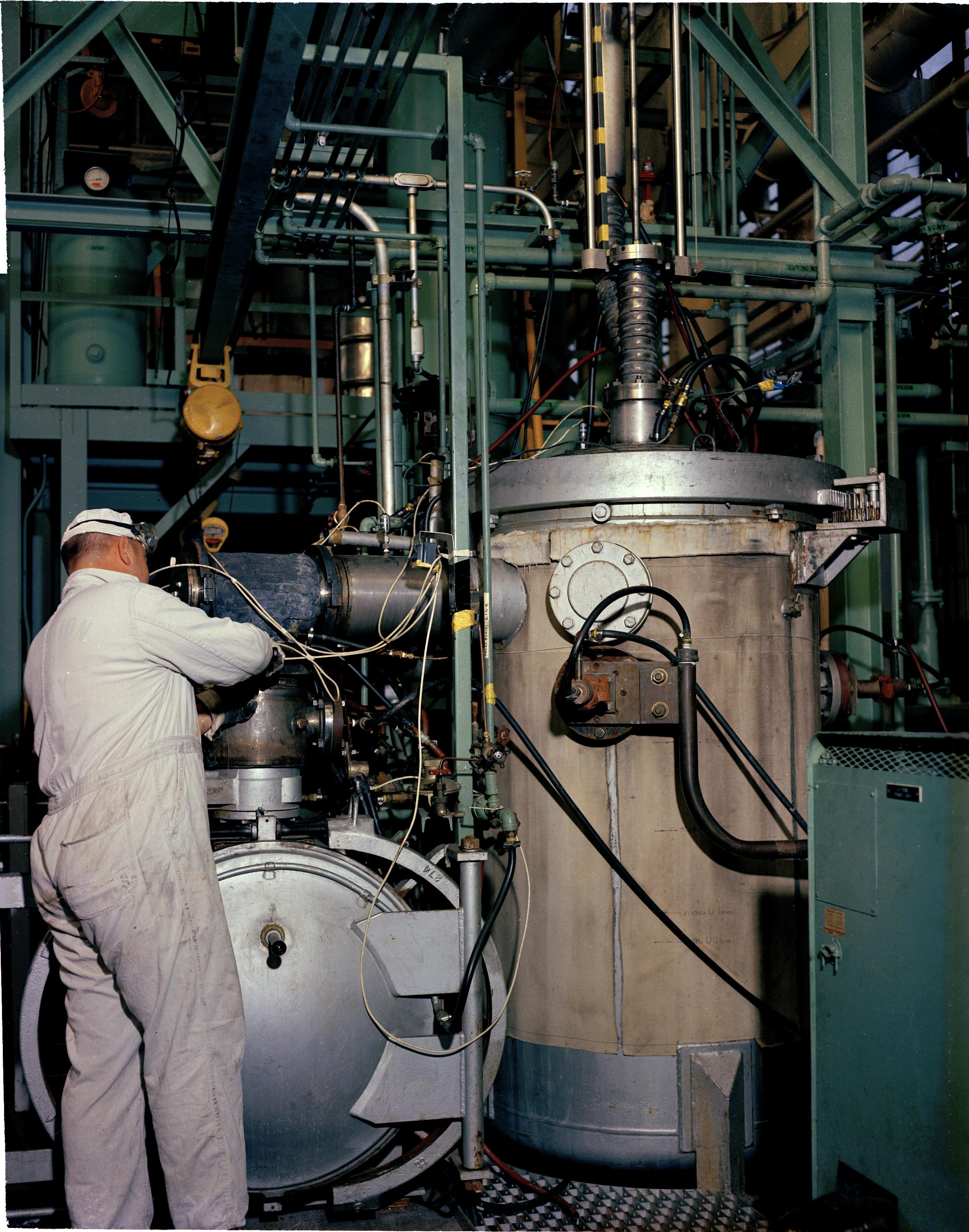
Reactor to convert uranium tetrafluoride to uranium metal at the Pilot Plant

The Pilot Plant consisted of small size equipment for piloting refinery operations, hexafluoride reduction, derby pickling, ingot casting, and other equipment for special purposes. This plant was used for numerous process testing and experimental operations as well as being employed as a production facility for various processes. The name was a misnomer, as it only operated in this manner for a short time, from October 1951 until the other plants became fully operational. In this role, it tested the Harshaw TBP-kerosene process later used in the Ore Refinery & Denitration Plant, the Union Carbide fluid bed process later employed in the Green Salt Plant, and uranium rolling and milling techniques.

After the closure of Plant 7 in 1956, the Pilot Plant converted uranium hexafluoride to green salt. This production process was operated with uranium hexafluoride that contained as much as 2.5% uranium-235. A two-step procedure was used. First was the vaporization of UF_{6}: solid UF_{6} was heated in three autoclaves at approximately 50 pounds per square inch (340 kPa) and 110 °C to produce gaseous UF_{6}. The next step was the reduction of the UF_{6} gas, which involved mixing it with hydrogen gas from dissociated ammonia at 480–650 °C in metal reactors to produce UF_{4} powder. Hydrogen fluoride was a valuable byproduct of the reaction, which was:

UF_{6} + H_{2} → UF_{4} + 2HF

Most of the thorium production activity at the FMPC took place inside the Pilot Plant. Thorium production activities began in 1964 and continued until 1980. Thorium metal was produced between 1969 and 1971, and thorium oxalate from 1971 to 1976. Hundreds of metric tons of recycled thorium, primarily in the form of thorium nitrate tetrahydrate solution, was received from Hanford and Savannah River. The Pilot Plant also coated metal-casting crucibles using plasma spraying with yttria to minimize carbon pickup in uranium metal products. The plant was demolished in 2003.

=== Analytical building ===
In the Analytical building, samples of materials were tested and analyzed at all stages of the production process.

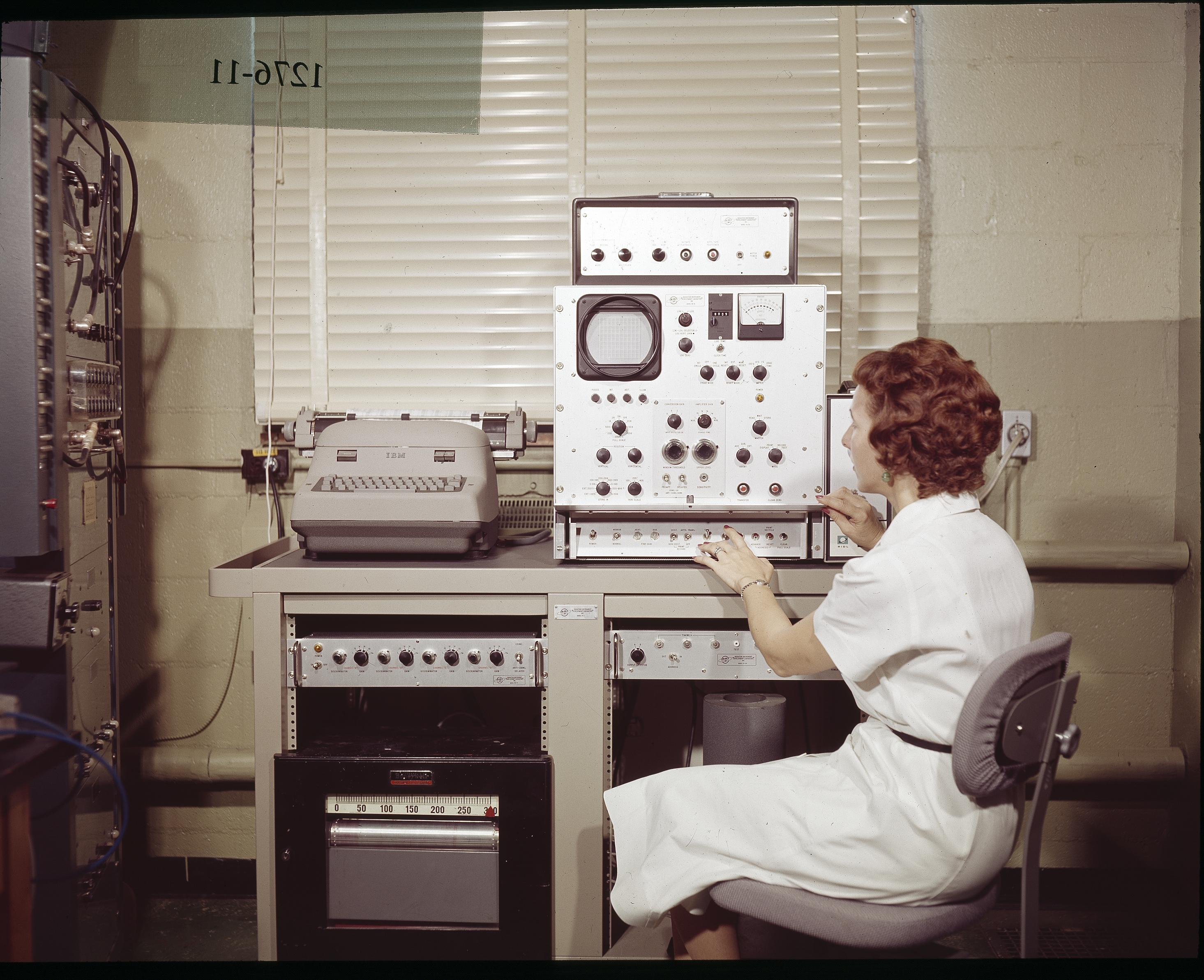
Multichannel pulse weight analyzer

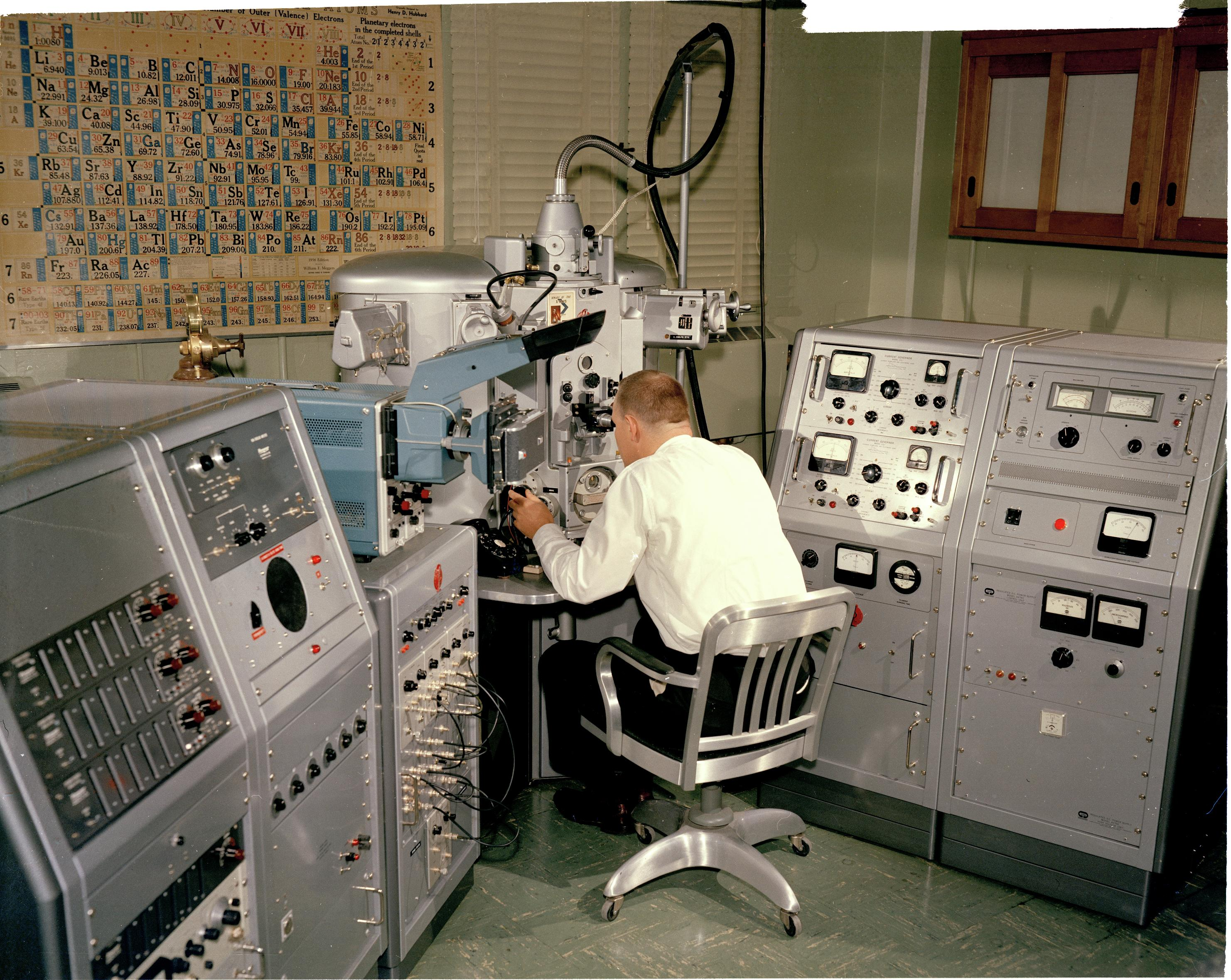
Micro probe

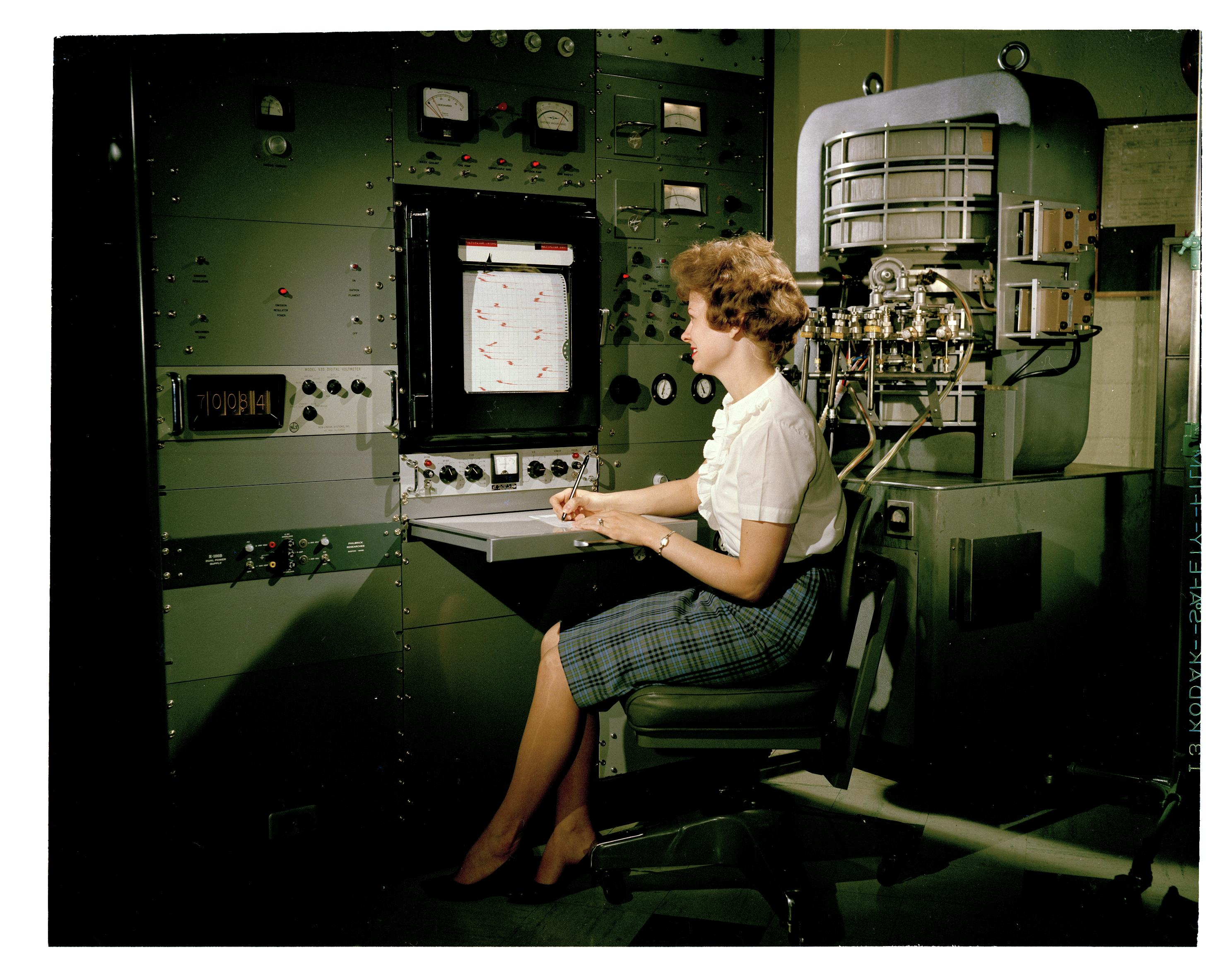
Mass spectrometer

== Health and safety ==
=== Contamination ===
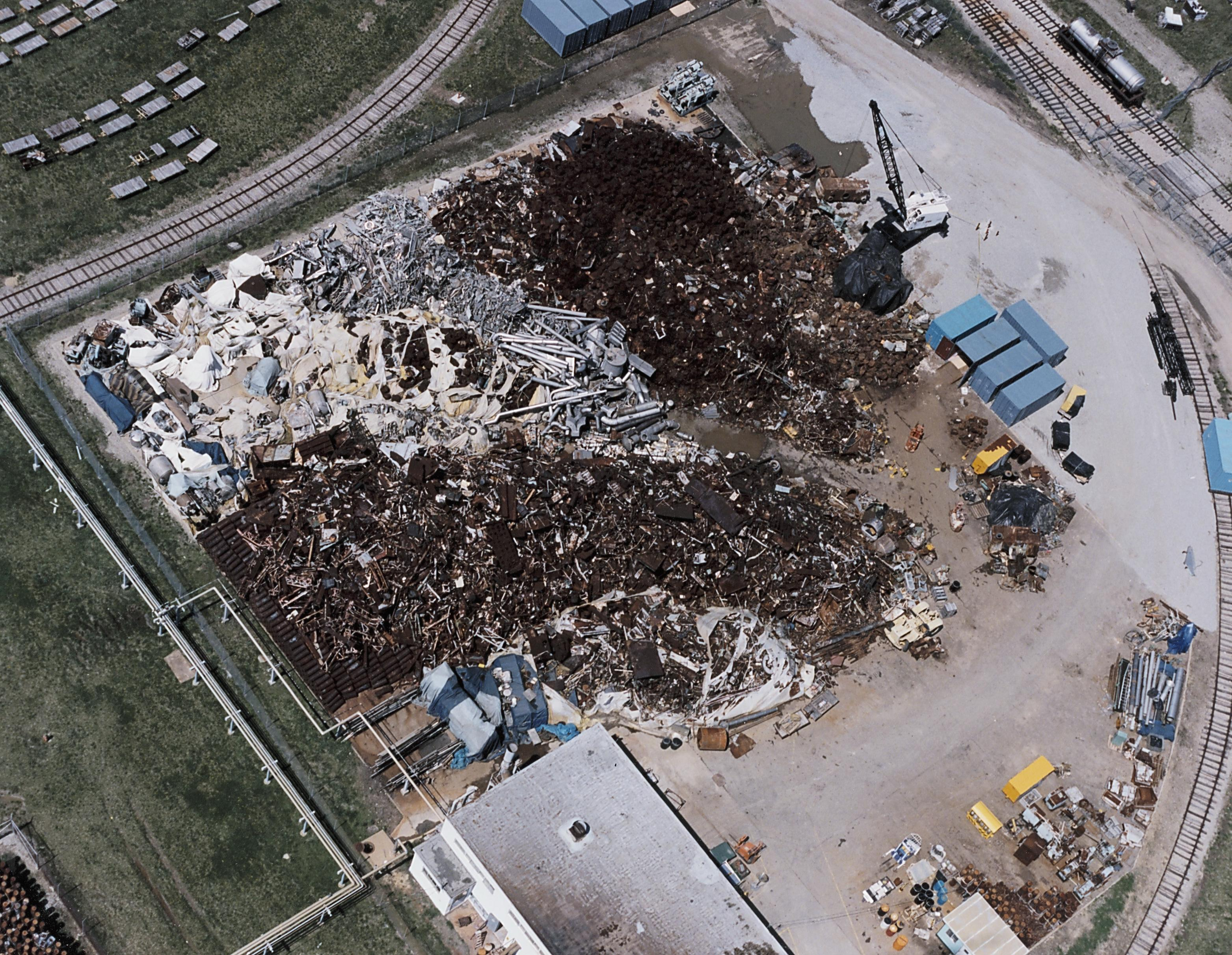
Contaminated scrap metal pile

Fernald came under criticism in 1984 when it was learned that the plant was releasing millions of pounds of uranium dust into the atmosphere, causing major radioactive contamination of the surrounding areas. Releases from the Fernald site to the surrounding area resulted in the exposure of community residents included ionizing radiation, soluble and insoluble forms of uranium, and various other hazardous chemicals. The Centers for Disease Control and Prevention (CDC) conducted a historical exposure characterization and developed dose estimation models through the Fernald Dose Reconstruction Project, with an endpoint of developing an algorithm to estimate doses to individual persons who lived within the exposure assessment domain (the area within a 10-kilometer (6.2 mi) radius from the center of the plant site). In addition to radioactive materials, many other non-radiological toxic substances were present in the production area as materials, by-products or products. Workers were exposed to chlorinated and non-chlorinated solvents, metals and metal salts, and nuisance dusts. Community residents may have been exposed to these substances through ground water pathways, soil contamination, and air dispersion of emissions from the site. News about the plant's operations led to the 1989 closure of nearby Fort Scott Camp, then the oldest Roman Catholic summer camp in the country.

=== Medical surveillance ===
Two separate medical surveillance programs, one for former workers and one for community residents, have been funded by settlements of class action litigation against National Lead of Ohio, a contractor for the Department of Energy (DOE), the successor to the AEC. These Fernald Settlement Funds are administered by a US Federal Court, which maintains oversight of the voluntary Fernald Medical Monitoring Programs. The Fernald (Residents) Medical Monitoring Program (FMMP) is for people who live within 5 miles (8.0 km) of the Fernald site, and the Fernald Workers Medical Monitoring Program (FWMMP) is for former workers who were employed when National Lead of Ohio was the contractor. Activities of the medical monitoring programs include both periodic medical examinations and diagnostic testing and yearly questionnaire data collection. In January 2007, there were 9,764 persons enrolled in the FMMP and 2,716 former workers enrolled in the FWMMP. The FMMP has an extensive computer database available for research studies. Blood, serum, plasma and urine samples were taken from FMMP participants during their initial examination, and over 160,000 one-milliliter aliquots have been stored at −80 °C since then.

=== Death of Dave Bocks ===
In June 1984, 39-year-old pipe fitter David "Dave" Bocks disappeared on shift and was reported missing. His remains were later discovered inside a uranium processing furnace located in Plant 6; a sudden 28 °F (16 °C) drop in furnace temperature (which was kept at a constant 1,350 °F (730 °C)) had been recorded at 5:15 am the night of Bocks's disappearance. The investigations found insufficient evidence that foul play was involved. However, some believed that he was murdered by one or more coworkers who suspected him of being a whistleblower in the 1984 nuclear emissions scandal.

== Fernald Closure Project ==
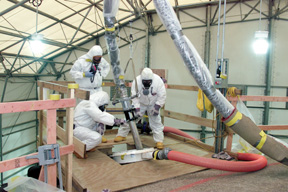
Workers working in a Rubb building to clean up thorium-bearing waste

Fernald was proposed as a superfund site on 14 July 1989 and listed on 21 November of that year. In 1990, Congress approved closure of the site and environmental cleanup of the facility. Fluor Fernald, part of the Fluor Corporation, was awarded the contract in 1992 for cleanup of the site. Low-level waste was shipped to Envirocare in Utah and Waste Control Specialists in Texas. More than 925,000 cubic yards (707,000 m^{3}) of waste was deposited in eight cells of On-Site Disposal Facility (OSDF), which were capped. Fluor Fernald completed their portion of the cleanup on 29 October 2006, 12 years ahead of schedule and at a cost of $4.4 billion, which was $7.8 billion below the original cost estimate.

== Fernald Preserve ==
With the cleanup of the surface areas completed, management of the site was transferred to DOE's Office of Legacy Management on 17 November 2006. The site was renamed the Fernald Preserve in 2007. Thousands of tons of contaminated concrete, sludge, liquid waste, and soil were removed and replaced with man-made wetlands and greenery. The site is permanently unfit for human habitation.

The On-Site Disposal Facility (background) at Fernald Preserve, containing capped cells of low-level radioactive waste from the former uranium processing plant, 2026.

Restored wetlands at the Fernald Preserve, Hamilton County, Ohio, on the remediated site of the former Feed Materials Production Center, 2026.

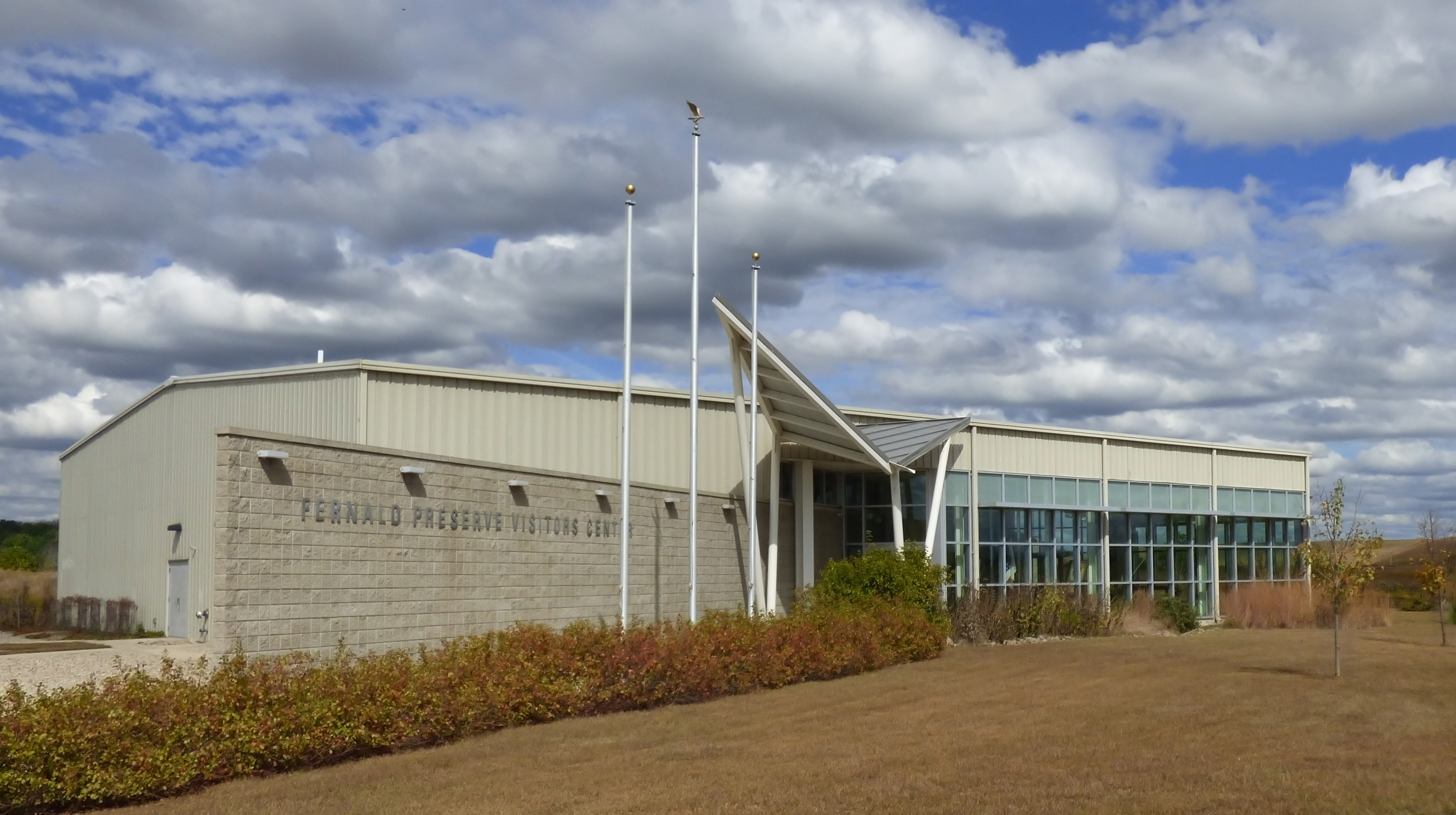
LEED platinum-awarded Fernald Preserve Visitor Center

Ongoing operations include routine monitoring of the environmental conditions with test wells, including the uranium groundwater plume extending south of the plant area, storage of residual waste onsite, and filtering of uranium contamination from the Great Miami River aquifer. These cleanup operations, along with restrictions on establishing new wells in areas exceeding water contaminant limits, are expected to continue for the foreseeable future.

== Sources ==
- Buck, Alice (1983). A History of the Atomic Energy Commission. Washington, D.C.: United States Department of Energy. OCLC 1017233738.
- Center for Disease Control (2003). Public Health Assessment - Feed Materials Production Center (PDF) (Report). Fernald Environmental Management Project.
- Fernald Environmental Management Project (January 1998). Historical Documentation of the Fernald Site and Its Role Within the U.S. Department of Energy Weapons Complex (PDF) (Report). Fernald, Ohio: U.S. Department of Energy, Fernald Area Office.
- Fernald Preserve (May 2024). Fernald Preserve 2023 Site Environmental Report (PDF) (Report). Washington, D.C.: U.S. Department of Energy, Office of Legacy Management.
- Hewlett, Richard G.; Duncan, Francis (1969). Atomic Shield, 1947–1952 (PDF). A History of the United States Atomic Energy Commission. University Park, Pennsylvania: Pennsylvania State University Press. ISBN 0-520-07187-5. OCLC 3717478. Archived (PDF) from the original on 7 April 2021.
- History Associates Incorporated (September 1987). History of the Production Complex: The Methods of Site Selection (Report). Rockville, Maryland. OSTI 5745137.
- Huegel, Casey A. (2024). Cleaning Up the Bomb Factory: Grassroots Activism and Nuclear Waste in the Midwest. Weyerhaeuser Environmental Books. Seattle: University of Washington Press. ISBN 978-0-295-75255-6. JSTOR jj.17733070. OCLC 1402736664.
- Jones, Vincent (1985). Manhattan: The Army and the Atomic Bomb (PDF). Washington, D.C.: United States Army Center of Military History. OCLC 10913875. Archived from the original (PDF) on 28 September 2013.
- Silverman, Michael Joshua (2000). No Immediate Risk: Environmental Safety in Nuclear Weapons Production, 1942–1985 (PhD thesis). Carnegie Mellon University. 304585833.
- Westinghouse Materials Company of Ohio; U.S. Department of Energy (1 March 1988). A Closer Look at Uranium Metal Production (PDF) (Report). Cincinnati, Ohio: U.S. Department of Energy. This article incorporates text from this source, which is in the public domain.
