= Richard Jackson (theatrical producer) =

Richard Jackson (born 31 March 1932) was a British theatrical agent and play producer from 1959 until retiring in 2003.

== Early life ==
He was educated at Cheltenham College 1945–48, and after completing his National Service was employed by Walt Disney Productions Ltd from 1956 - 1958.

== Awards and recognition ==
- Life member of BAFTA
- Officier de l’Ordre des Arts et des Lettres, 1993.

== Early career ==
He was Company Manager for Lindsay Kemp's "Pierrot in Turquoise" featuring David Bowie (Mercury Theatre and Tour) 1967.

== Productions ==
- Jock-on-the-Go (Jeanetta Cochrane Theatre) 1973.
- Chox - Cambridge Footlights Revue (Comedy Theatre) 1974.
- Peter Pan Man (Kings Head) 1975.
- The Polynesian Prime Minister with Vikki Richards 1975.
- Charles Trenet in Concert (Royal Albert Hall) 1975.
- Madame de Sade (Kings Head) 1975.
- Jade (Kings Head) with Annie Ross 1975.
- Carol's Christmas (Kings Head) with Nigel Stock and Prunella Gee 1975.
- The Bitter Tears of Petra Von Kant (New End) 1976, with Delphine Seyrig.
- Better Days, Better Knights (Kings Head) 1976.
- Blind Date (King's Head) with Julia Foster and Nigel Hawthorne 1977.
- Oedipus at the Crossroads (King's Head) with Nicky Henson and Raymond Westwell 1977.
- Like Dolls or Angels (King's Head) with Prunella Gee and Rupert Frazer 1977.
- An Evening with Quentin Crisp (Duke of Yorks and Ambassadors) 1978.
- The Singular Life of Albert Nobbs with Susannah York, Julia Foster and Stephanie Beacham.
- A Tribute to Lili Lamont (New End) with Gloria Grahame and Don Fellows 1978.
- Flashpoint (New End and Mayfair)1978.
- A Day in Hollywood. A Night in Ukraine (New End and Mayfair, which received the Evening Standard Award for Best Musical and Plays and Players Award for Best Comedy, 1979.
- The Square with Angela Pleasence/La Musica with Estelle Kohler (double bill), 1979
- Portrait of Dora (New End) 1979.
- Appearances (Mayfair) with Susannah York and Daniel Massey, 1980.
- A Galway Girl (Lyric Studio) 1980.
- Latin with Simon Russell Beale (Lyric Studio) 1983.
- The Human Voice with Susannah York, performed World-wide 1984-92.
- Swimming Pools At War with Prunella Gee and Mary Tamm (Offstage) 1985.
- Matthew, Mark, Luke and Charlie (Latchmere) 1986.
- I Ought to be in Pictures (Offstage) 1986.
- Pier Paola Pasolini (Offstage) 1987.
- Creditors/Latin (New End - double bill) 1989.
- Beached (Old Red Lion) 1990.
- Hamlet with Kevin Doyle and Susannah York (Howarth Festival USA) 1990.
- Eden Cinema (Offstage) with Doreen Mantle, Julia Foster and Emma Rice). Winner of the Peter Brook Empty Space Award 1991.
- Noonbreak with Susannah York (French Institute) 1991.
- Beardsley (Offstage) 1992.
- Don't Play with Love (French Institute and Rudolf Steiner House) 1992.
- Play with Cocaine (New Grove) 1993.
- The Eagle Has Two Heads with Lisa Harrow (Lilian Baylis) 1994.
- Happy Days with Angela Pleasence (French Institute) 1994.
- The Star-Spangled Girl (Latchmere) 1994.
- Suzanna Andler with Susan Hampshire and Bryony Brind (BAC) 1995
- Independent State with Susannah York (Latchmere and Australian Tour) 1995.
- The First Years/ Beginnings (Latchmere) 1995.
- Last Legs (Latchmere) 1995.
- This Wretched Splendour (Latchmere) 1998.
- Eugene Onegin (White Bear) 1999.
- An Evening For Quentin Crisp (Drill Hall) 2000.
- Marry Me You Idiot with Lynda Bellingham and Jacki Piper (Jermyn Street) 2002.
- The Loves of Shakespeare's Women devised and performed by Susannah York (Jermyn Street) 2003.
