= Basilica of The National Shrine of Our Lady of Fatima (Lewiston, New York) =

Shrine or Our Lady of Fatima in Lewiston New York

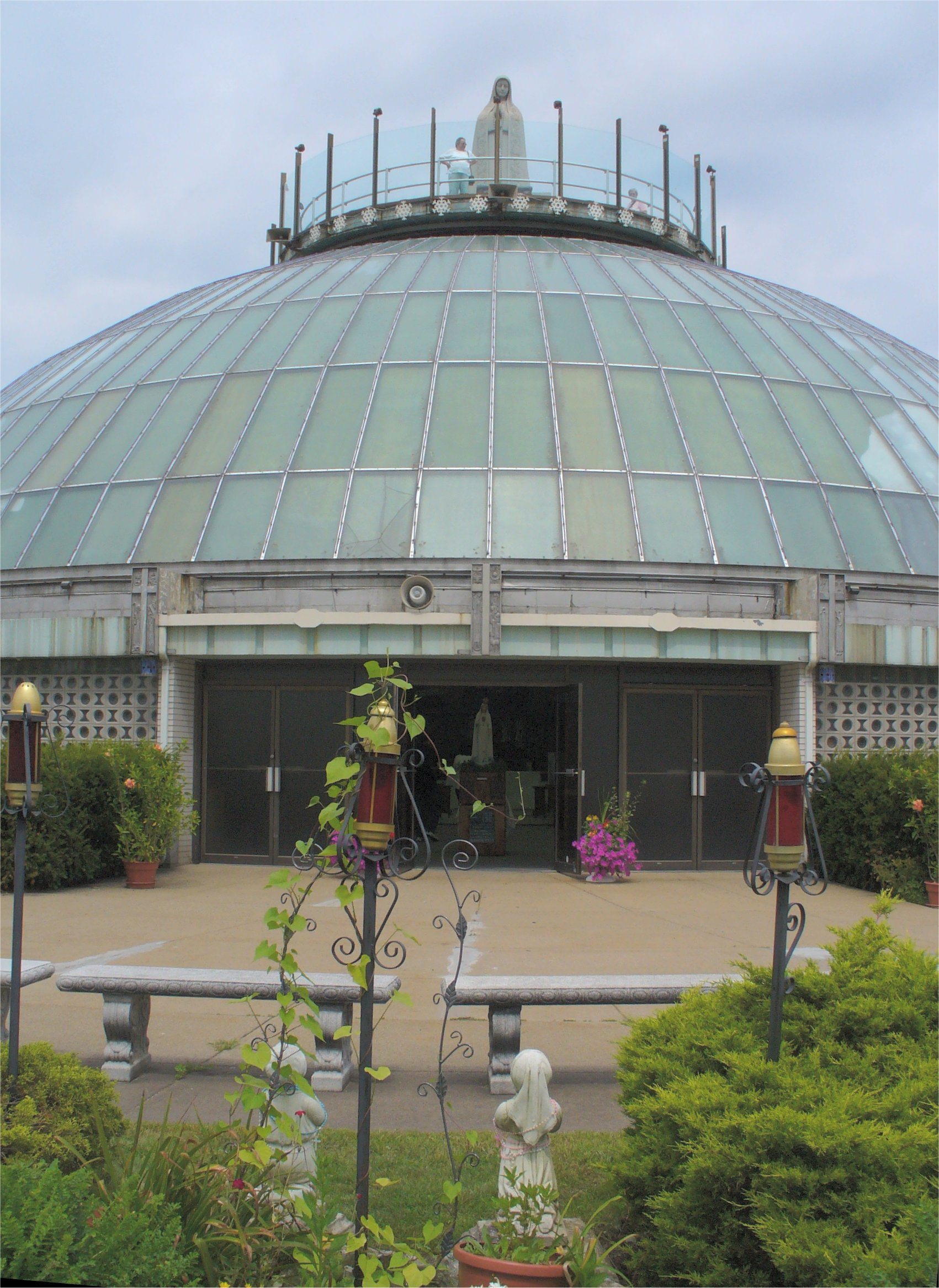
- Basilica of The National Shrine of Our Lady of Fatima
- Basilica of The National Shrine of Our Lady of Fatima
- 43°12′0.5538″N 79°0′17.03″W
- Location: Lewiston, NY
- Country: United States
- Denomination: Roman Catholic
- Tradition: Latin Rite
- Website: National Shrine of Our Lady of Fatima

History
- Status: Minor basilica
- Dedication: Blessed Virgin Mary
- Dedicated: 1965

Architecture
- Functional status: Active
- Architect: Joseph E. Fronczak
- Architectural type: Church
- Style: Modernism

Administration
- Diocese: Buffalo, New York

Clergy
- Bishop: Michael William Fisher
- Rector: The Barnabite Fathers

The Basilica of the National Shrine of Our Lady of Fatima is a Modernist minor basilica and US national shrine of the Roman Catholic Church, honoring the Blessed Virgin Mary as Our Lady of Fatima, the patroness of the United States. The shrine is directed by the Barnabite Fathers. It is located at 1023 Swann Road in Lewiston, New York, USA, north of Niagara Falls.

== History ==
In the mid-1950s the Barnabite fathers had been invited to the Diocese of Buffalo to teach in Catholic Schools. Arriving from Italy they were studying English in Buffalo and Niagara Falls. They were seeking a place of their own to build a Seminary to house candidates for the priesthood. Walter Ciurzak, who had received a miraculous recovery from a stroke, through the intercession of the Blessed Mother, had land he wanted to donate. In 1954 he donated 15 acres of land to the Barnabite Fathers on the condition that some shrine be also built to honor the Blessed Mother. While the Fathers anticipated a simple grotto shrine similar to those found at many parish churches Catholic Polish and Italian communities in the Niagara Falls region joined together to make the Shrine a centerpiece of the project. At that time, the shrine began with just one humble statue of Our Lady of Fatima. Later, in 1960, the shrine that exists today was founded.

The church was started in 1963 and dedicated in 1965.

On October 7, 1975 Pope Paul VI conferred the title of basilica upon the church. Thousands of pilgrims from around the country and the world visit the basilica each year.

== Notable features ==
The basilica is located on 16 acres of land. The basilica is highlighted by a magnificent dome that measures 100 feet (30 m) in diameter and 55-foot (17 m) high. The dome is covered with two layers of glass and acrylic glass depicting a contour of the Northern Hemisphere. On top of the dome, there is a statue of Our Lady of Fatima which is 13 feet (4.0 m) high and weighs 10 tons, sculpted from Vermont granite.

A 48-foot (15 m)-tall bell tower was built during the 25th anniversary year, 1981, and is dedicated to the memory of Barnabite Father Charles M. Barlassina, who served at the shrine.

Other highlights include:

- A Shrine of St. Anthony Mary Zaccari
- The Little Chapel of Fatima
- The Avenue of Saints, where over one hundred life-size marble statues represent Saints from every race and walk of life are featured.
- A Shrine of Mother Cabrini

== Renovation ==
In 2008, a $6 million renovation was undertaken. It was the first major renovation and addition in over fifty years. The rector, Father Julio Ciavaglia of the Barnibite Fathers, collaborated with architects for the design of 7,400 sq.ft. of additional space. The overall focus for this work brings the old world artisan experience with the use of granite stone walls, arched doorways, stained glass windows, structural wood beams and copper roofs to the shrine.

The renovation included a new ambulatory space around the front entrance to provide a separation between the main domed basilica and the exterior. This space provides an area for visitors to experience the basilica and the adjoining chapels without interrupting an ongoing service. The existing Sacristy along the rear of the building was removed and replaced with a 2,260 sq. ft. addition for small gatherings and to show the historical compilation of religious relics that have been collected by the Barnibite Fathers.

== See also ==
- List of Catholic basilicas
- Roman Catholic Diocese of Buffalo
- Barnabites
