= Fort Scott Camp =

Former Roman Catholic summer campground in Ohio, United States

Coordinates: 39°16′20″N 84°39′49″W

Fort Scott Camp or Fort Scott Camps was a residential summer campground for youth in Crosby Township, Ohio, near New Baltimore. Founded by the Roman Catholic Archdiocese of Cincinnati in 1922, it was the first Roman Catholic youth camp in the United States. It was named after Michael Scott, one of the first Catholics to reside in Cincinnati, who built the diocese's first cathedral. The camp closed in 1988 amid environmental concerns. Approximately 150,000 children between seven and 15 years old attended the camp over its history.

== History ==
Fort Scott Camp opened in 1922 on Mt. Nebo Road near Cleves. Due to space constraints, it moved to a 204-acre (83 ha) property near New Baltimore in 1924.

The camp was located 2 miles (3.2 km) from Fernald Feed Materials Production Center. In 1984, Fernald was revealed to be a uranium processing plant that was sending radioactive contamination into the air. Westinghouse Materials Company, which took over the plant in 1986, installed civil defense sirens at the camp to warn of any problems at the plant. Despite tests showing no soil or water contamination at the campground, attendance was projected to decline by half due to concerns about Fernald. The camp had its last summer camp in 1988 and closed in 1989 after 66 years in operation. A Girl Scout camp to the north, Camp Ross Trails, also closed in October 1988 due to concerns about Fernald.

In 1995, local developers purchased the land from the archdiocese. Remaining buildings were razed, and in the 2000s and 2010s, the property was developed into a residential subdivision named Fort Scott Community, originally planned to include 950 homes. On October 23, 2016, the Fort Scott Camp Staff Alumni Association erected a historical marker along Blue Rock Road to commemorate the former camp.
