= Haven =

Haven or The Haven may refer to:

- Harbor or haven, a sheltered body of water where ships can be docked

== Arts and entertainment ==
=== Fictional characters ===
- Haven (Anita Blake: Vampire Hunter), from the novel series
- Haven (comics), from the X-Men comics
- Haven, from the novel Evermore by Alyson Noel
- Haven, from Fusion comic books

=== Fictional places ===
- Haven (fictional town), in the TV series Haven
- Haven, in the fantasy role-playing game Earthdawn
- Haven, in the video game Myst IV: Revelation
- Haven, in the role-playing game Shatterzone
- Haven, associated with the Alliance (DC Comics)
- Haven, in the War World book series
- Haven, in Stephen King's novel The Tommyknockers

=== Film and television ===
- Haven (film), 2004
  - Haven (soundtrack)
- Haven (TV series), 2010
- Haven (TV miniseries), 2001, starring Natasha Richardson
- "Haven" (Dark Angel), 2001
- "Haven" (Star Trek: The Next Generation), 1987
- "Haven" (Transformers episode), 2005
- "The Haven" (The Outer Limits), 1999

=== Music ===
- Haven (band), an English indie rock band
- Haven (Dark Tranquillity album), 2000, and the title track
- Haven (Flook album), 2005
- Haven (Kamelot album), 2015
- Haven (Marianas Trench album), 2024

=== Gaming ===
- Haven (video game), a 2020 role-playing video game
- Haven: Call of the King, a 2002 video game
- Haven: City of Violence, a role-playing game

=== Books ===
- The Haven (novel), a 1909 novel by the British writer Eden Phillpotts
- Haven: The Dramatic Story of 1000 World War II Refugees and How They Came to America, by Ruth Gruber, 1983
- The Haven (book), a 2002 memoir by Canadian author Richard Dubé

== Businesses ==
- Haven (healthcare), an American not-for-profit entity
- Haven Holidays, a British leisure company
- Haven Hotel, in Dorset, England
- Haven Inc., a shipping logistics company

== Schools ==
- Haven High Academy, Boston, England, UK
- Haven Institute (Gabriola Island, Canada), a residential learning centre in British Columbia
- Haven Institute (Meridian, Mississippi), also known as Haven Institute and Conservatory of Music, a former school
- Haven Middle School, Evanston, Illinois, US
- Haven USD 312, a school district in Haven, Kansas, US

== People ==
- Haven (given name), including a list of people with the name
- Haven (surname), including a list of people with the name

== Places ==
=== United Kingdom ===
- The Haven, Boston, the tidal river of the port of Boston
- The Haven, West Sussex
- The Haven, Grimsby, later part of the Port of Grimsby
- The Haven, Hull, later part of the Port of Hull

=== United States ===
- Haven, Kansas
- Haven, New York
- Haven, Washington
- Haven, Wisconsin
- Haven Township, Sherburne County, Minnesota

=== Elsewhere ===
- Haven, Victoria, Australia
- Haven Hill, Ross Dependency, Antarctica
- Haven Mountain, Oates Land, Antarctica

== Science and technology ==
- Haven (software), a security application
- Haven (graph theory), a mathematical function

== Ships ==
- Haven-class hospital ship, a class of U.S. Navy ships
  - USS Haven (AH-12)
- MT Haven, an oil tanker

== Other uses ==
- Whitehaven R.L.F.C., nicknamed Haven, an English rugby league club

== See also ==
- De Haven (disambiguation)
- HavenCo, a data hosting services company
- Havens (disambiguation)
- Heaven (disambiguation)
