= Havens =

Havens may refer to:

== People ==
=== In academia ===
- George Remington Havens (1890–1977), American academic of French literature
- J. Havens Richards (1851–1923), American Jesuit educator
- Kayri Havens, American botanist
- Leston Havens (1924–2011), American psychiatrist, psychotherapist and medical educator
- Thomas Havens (born 1939), American Japanologist
- William W. Havens Jr. (1920–2004), American physicist

=== In the arts ===
- Bob Havens (born 1930), American big band and jazz musician
- James D. Havens (1900–1960), American printmaker and painter
- Jeb Havens, American video game developer
- Nol Havens, lead singer of VOF de Kunst
- Randy Havens, American actor
- Richie Havens (1941–2013), American singer-songwriter and guitarist
  - Richard P. Havens, 1983, a music album

=== In politics ===
- Charles S. Havens (1834–1906), American businessman and politician
- Harrison E. Havens (1837–1916), American lawyer and politician
- James S. Havens (1859–1927), American politician
- John S. Havens (1826–1903), American politician and businessman
- Jonathan Nicoll Havens (1757–1799), American politician
- Palmer E. Havens (1818–1886), American politician

=== In sport ===
- Brad Havens (born 1959), American baseball player
- Braeden Havens (born 1993), American racing driver
- Charlie Havens (1903–1996), American football player
- Frank Havens (canoeist) (1924–2018), American sprint canoeist
- Jess Havens (born 2003), American racing driver
- Ralph Havens (born 1943), American luger
- Reese Havens (born 1986), American baseball player
- William Havens (1919–2013), American canoeist

=== Others ===
- Beckwith Havens (1890–1969), American aviator
- Benny Havens (1787–1877), American tavernkeeper
- Frank C. Havens (1848–1918), American lawyer
- John Havens (born 1956), American businessman
- Ralph Havens (born 1943), American luger

== Places ==
- Havens, Nebraska, U.S.
- Havens, Ohio, U.S.
- Havens Mansion and Carriage House, San Francisco, California, U.S.
- Havens Wildlife Management Area, Roanoke County, Virginia, U.S.
- The Havens, in Pembrokeshire, Wales

== Other uses ==
- Havens (department store), in Westcliff-on-Sea, Essex, England
- Havens (typeface), from the Inland Type Foundry

== See also ==
- Haven (disambiguation)
- Havers (disambiguation)
