= Haven (surname) =

Haven is an English surname. Notable people with the surname include:

- Annette Haven (born 1954), American pornographic actress
- Erastus Otis Haven (1820–1881), American bishop
- George G. Haven, Jr. (1866–1925), American businessman
- Gilbert Haven (1821-1880), American clergyman, Methodist Episcopal bishop
- James Haven (born 1973), American actor and director
- Jens Haven (1724–1796), Moravian missionary
- Martin Haven, British auto racing commentator
- Nathaniel Appleton Haven (1762–1831), American politician, U.S. Representative from New Hampshire
- Samuel Foster Haven (1806–1881), American archeologist and anthropologist
- Samuel Haven, American judge
- Jason Haven, American minister
- Solomon G. Haven (1810–1861), American politician, U.S. Representative from New York

== See also ==
- Havens (disambiguation)
- Havers (disambiguation)
