= Koningin Juliana =

Koningin Juliana may refer to -

- Juliana of the Netherlands (1909-2004, Dutch: Koningin Juliana), Queen of the Netherlands 1948–80.
- MV Koningin Juliana, a ferry in service 1969-84
