= DeHaven =

DeHaven or De Haven is a surname. Notable people with the surname include:

- Bruce DeHaven (1948–2016), American football coach
- Carter DeHaven (1886–1977), American actor
- Carter DeHaven (producer), American film producer
- David W. DeHaven (1872–1943), Justice of the Tennessee Supreme Court
- Edwin De Haven (1816–1865), United States Navy officer and explorer
- Flora Parker DeHaven (1883–1950), American actress
- Gloria DeHaven (1925–2016), American actress
- Hugh DeHaven (1895–1980), American pilot, engineer and passive safety pioneer
- John J. De Haven (1849–1913), U.S. Representative from California
- Penny DeHaven (1948–2014), American country music singer
- Tom De Haven (born 1949), American writer

== See also ==
- De Haven (disambiguation)
