= Organ Needle =

Mountain in New Mexico, United States

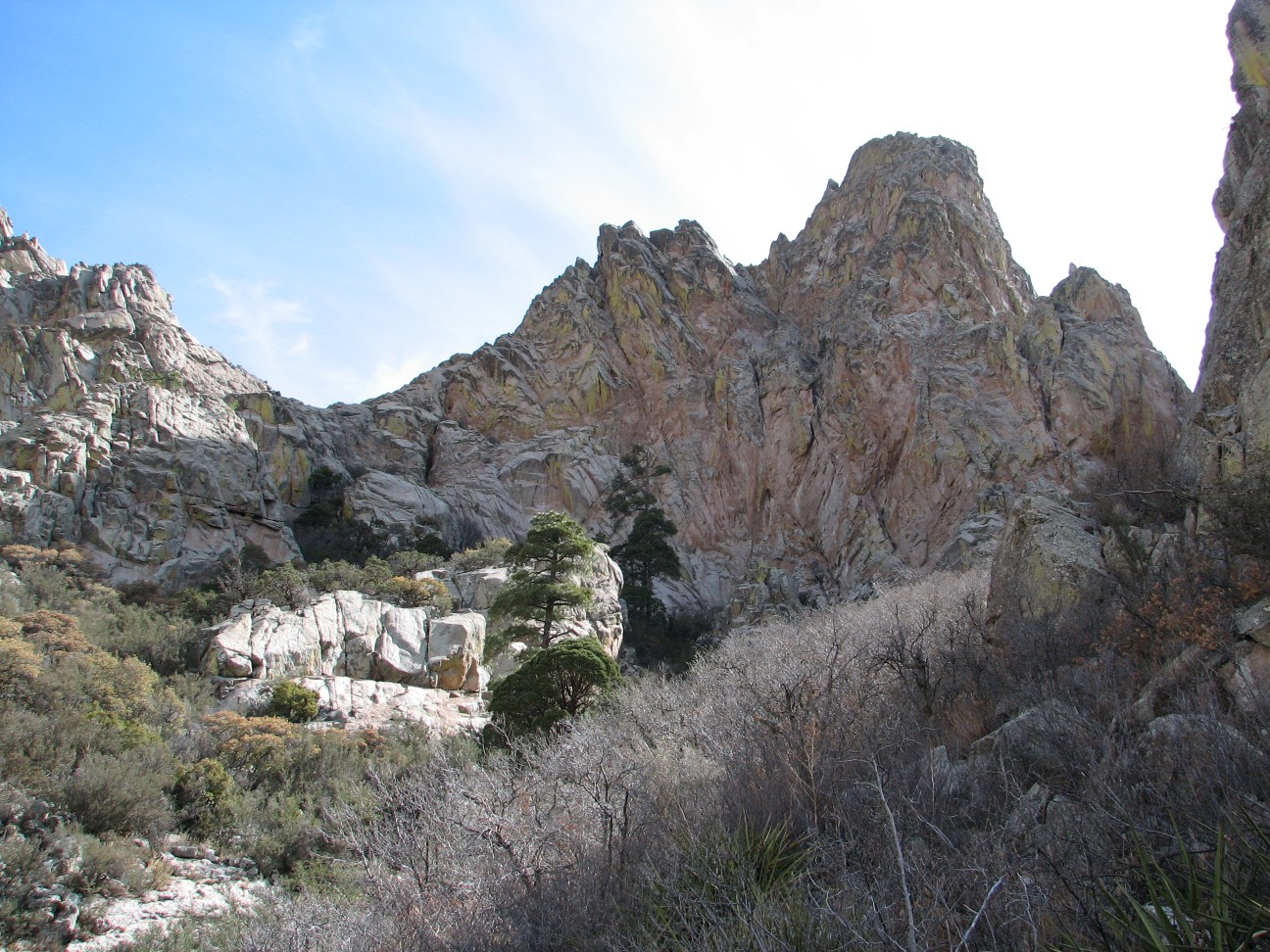
- View of Organ Needle from the west

Highest point
- Elevation: 8982+ ft (2738+ m) NAVD 88
- Prominence: 3,700 ft (1,100 m)
- Coordinates: 32°20′42″N 106°33′41″W

Geography
- Location: Doña Ana County, New Mexico, U.S.
- Parent range: Organ Mountains
- Topo map: USGS Organ Peak

Climbing
- Easiest route: Off-trail hike/scramble, class 3+ or 4

Organ Needle is the highest point of the Organ Mountains in the south-central part of the U.S. state of New Mexico. It lies in Doña Ana County, 13 miles (20,921 m) east-northeast of Las Cruces and 4 miles (6 km) southwest of White Sands, headquarters of the White Sands Missile Range. It is at the southeast end of a narrow ridge of vertically jointed granite (more specifically, quartz monzonite) called The Needles.

Organ Needle is one of the most dramatic peaks in the state. True to its name, it is a steep, pointed summit. Moreover, it rises 4,000 feet (1,220 m) above the edge of the Tularosa Basin to the northeast in only 2 miles (3.2 km), and 5,100 feet (1,554 m) above Las Cruces, giving it as large and as steep a degree of local relief as any peak in the state, including Big Hatchet Peak, Sandia Crest, and Shiprock.

Climbing Organ Needle involves tricky route-finding, a vertical gain of about 4,000 feet (1,200 m) and a difficult scramble (class 3+ or 4).
