= Kayri Havens =

American botanist

- Education: Southern Illinois University Carbondale (B.S. and M.S.), Indiana University (Ph.D.)
- Scientific career
- Fields: botany, pollination, climate change, ex situ conservation
- Workplaces: Missouri Botanical Garden, Chicago Botanic Garden, Northwestern University, University of Illinois at Chicago, Loyola University Chicago
- Thesis: Nonrandom reproductive success in an endangered evening primrose (Oenothera organensis) (1994)

Kayri Havens is an American botanist with expertise in reproductive ecology and rare, threatened, and endangered species conservation, including seed banking. She is the Medard and Elizabeth Welch Director of Plant Science and Conservation at the Chicago Botanic Garden. Havens is the co-director of Project Budburst, a community science project that facilitates the collection of plant phenology observations. In 2019, she was the recipient of the American Horticultural Society's Liberty Hyde Bailey Award for her achievements in plant conservation.
