= Organ Mountains =

Mountain range in southern New Mexico

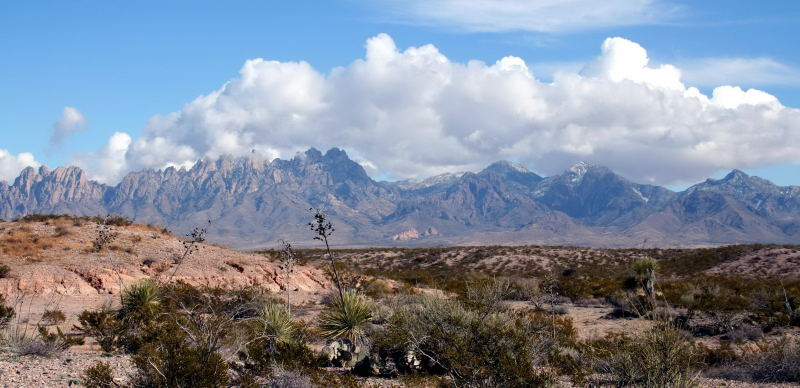
- The Organ Mountains seen from the west

Highest point
- Peak: Organ Needle
- Elevation: 2,738 m (8,983 ft)

Dimensions
- Length: 85 mi (137 km) N-S
- Width: 24 mi (39 km) W-E

Geography
- Location within New Mexico
- Country: United States
- State: New Mexico
- Region: (northwest) Chihuahuan Desert
- District: Doña Ana County, NM
- Range coordinates: 32°19′48″N 106°35′24″W
- Borders on: San Andres Mountains

Geology
- Rock type(s): granite, rhyolite

The Organ Mountains (Spanish: La Sierra de los Órganos, Mescalero-Chiricahua: Tsé daadeezhá-yá) are a rugged mountain range in southern New Mexico in the Southwestern United States. Organ Mountains–Desert Peaks National Monument was declared a national monument on May 21, 2014. They lie 10 mi (16 km) east of the city of Las Cruces, in Doña Ana County. Organ Needle is the highest peak in the range with an elevation of 8,982 feet (2,738 m).

== Geography ==
The Organ Mountains are near the southern end of a long line of mountains on the east side of the Rio Grande's rift valley. The range is nearly contiguous with the San Andres Mountains to the north and the Franklin Mountains to the south, but is very different geologically: whereas the San Andres and Franklin Mountains are both formed from west-dipping fault blocks of mostly sedimentary strata (with limestone most prominent), the Organ Mountains are made primarily of igneous rock (intrusive granite and extrusive rhyolite). Their name reflects their similarity in appearance (particularly the granite "needles" in the highest part of the range) with pipes that would be part of a pipe organ.

The San Andres Mountains (southern subrange of San Augustin Mountains) are separated from the Organ Mountains by San Augustin Pass, through which U.S. Highway 70 passes on its way to White Sands Missile Range, White Sands National Park and Alamogordo. The Franklin Mountains are separated from the Organ Mountains by a 10-mile wide low area known as Anthony Gap. Much of this intervening land is part of Fort Bliss.

== Geology ==
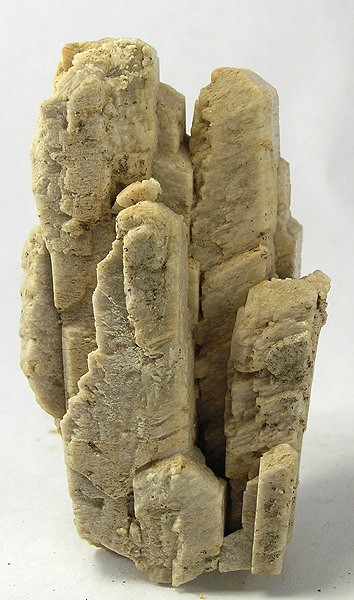
Orthoclase specimen from the Organ Mountains

The Organ Mountains are made up of three major sections:

- On the north end is a narrow ridge of vertically-jointed Tertiary granite (more specifically, quartz monzonite) called The Needles. This is a picturesque section and includes the highest point in the range, Organ Needle at an elevation of 8,982 feet (2,738 m).
- On the south side of The Needles is a much wider section of extrusive igneous rock, mostly a purplish-gray rhyolite. This section forms the bulk of the mountain range and reaches heights nearly as great as The Needles. This section is cut in half by Soledad Canyon, which extends west from the east side of the range, separated by a low ridge and Soledad Pass from Bar Canyon on the west side.
- The third portion of the Organ Mountains consists of the Bishop's Cap Hills on the southwest side of the range and Rattlesnake Ridge on the southeast side of the range. This third section is much smaller and lower in elevation than the other sections of the range, and consists of fault-block limestone similar to that of the San Andres and Franklin Mountains.

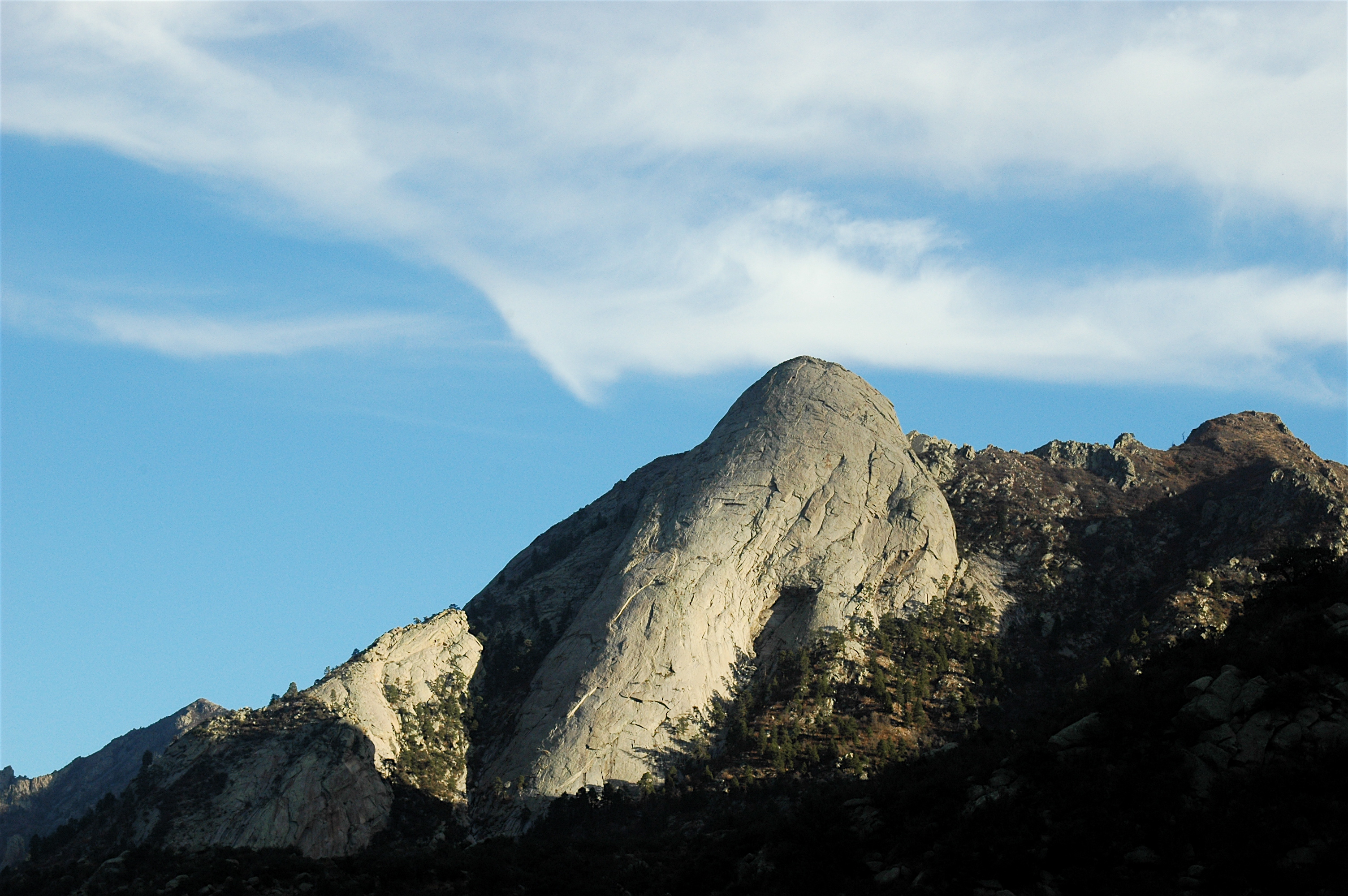
Sugarloaf Peak is a feature on the East side of the Organ Mountains

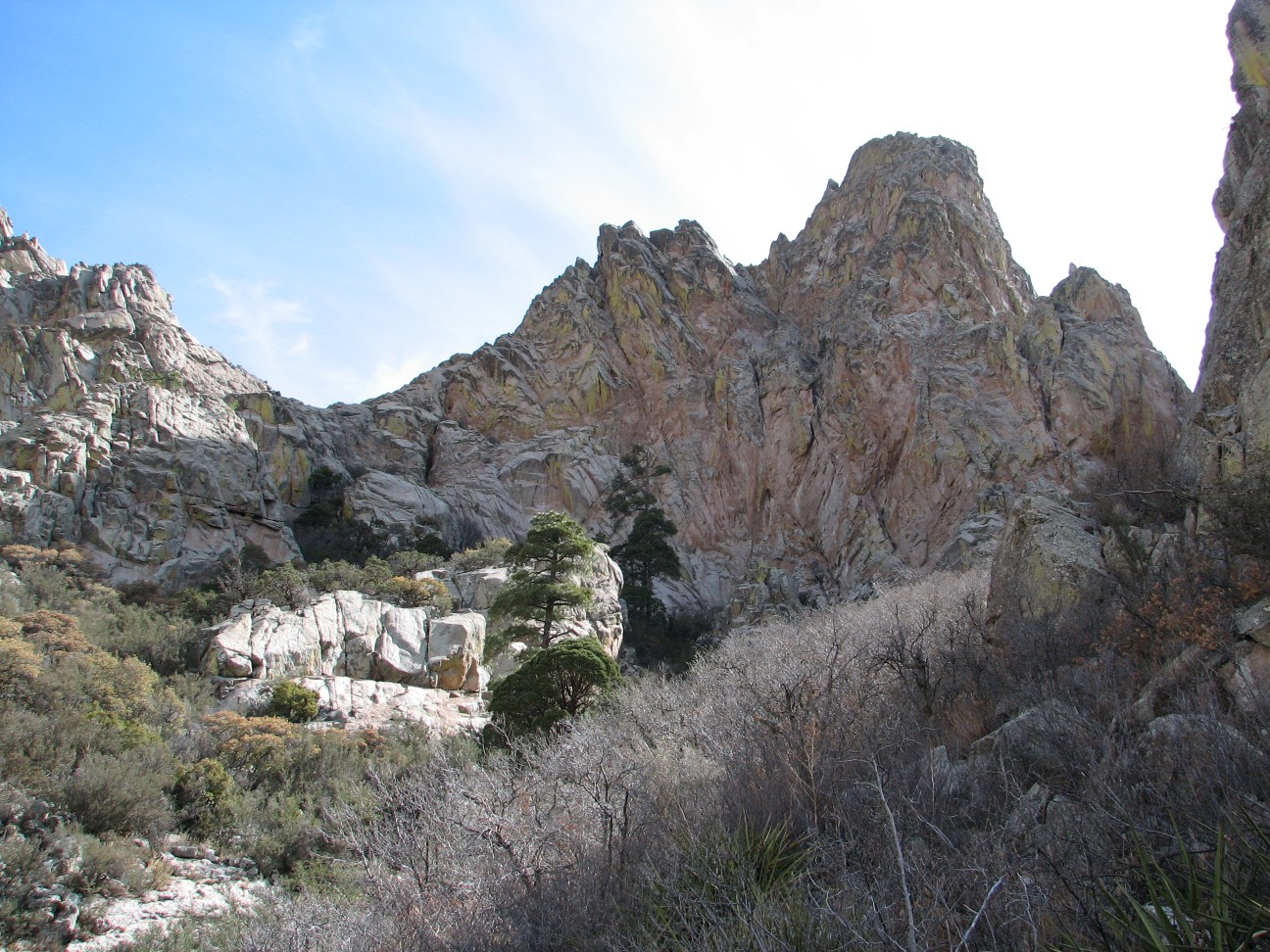
View of Organ Needle, the highest of the Organ Mountains at 8,982 feet (2,738 m)

== Botany ==
The Organ Mountains are a botanically diverse mountain range in New Mexico, with approximately 870 vascular plant species. Several of these, including the Organ Mountains evening-primrose (Oenothera organensis) and smooth figwort (Scrophularia laevis), are endemic to the mountain range and occur only in small, scattered populations.

The range also has a high diversity in ferns, with 30 of the 56 species reported for New Mexico occurring within it.

The flora differs greatly between the three sections of the mountain range, with the two igneous sections (The Needles and the central extrusive portion) sharing relatively few species with the southern limestone portions. The limestone section includes some of the northernmost populations of lechuguilla (Agave lecheguilla), often considered an indicator species of the Chihuahuan Desert, whereas the igneous sections of the range include all of the endemic taxa and have botanical affinity with Madrean flora typical of the southwestern sky islands.

The protected lands surrounding the National Monument are threatened by the expansion of nearby settlements, energy development and mining, invasive species, and growing aridity due to climate change.

== Hiking and climbing ==
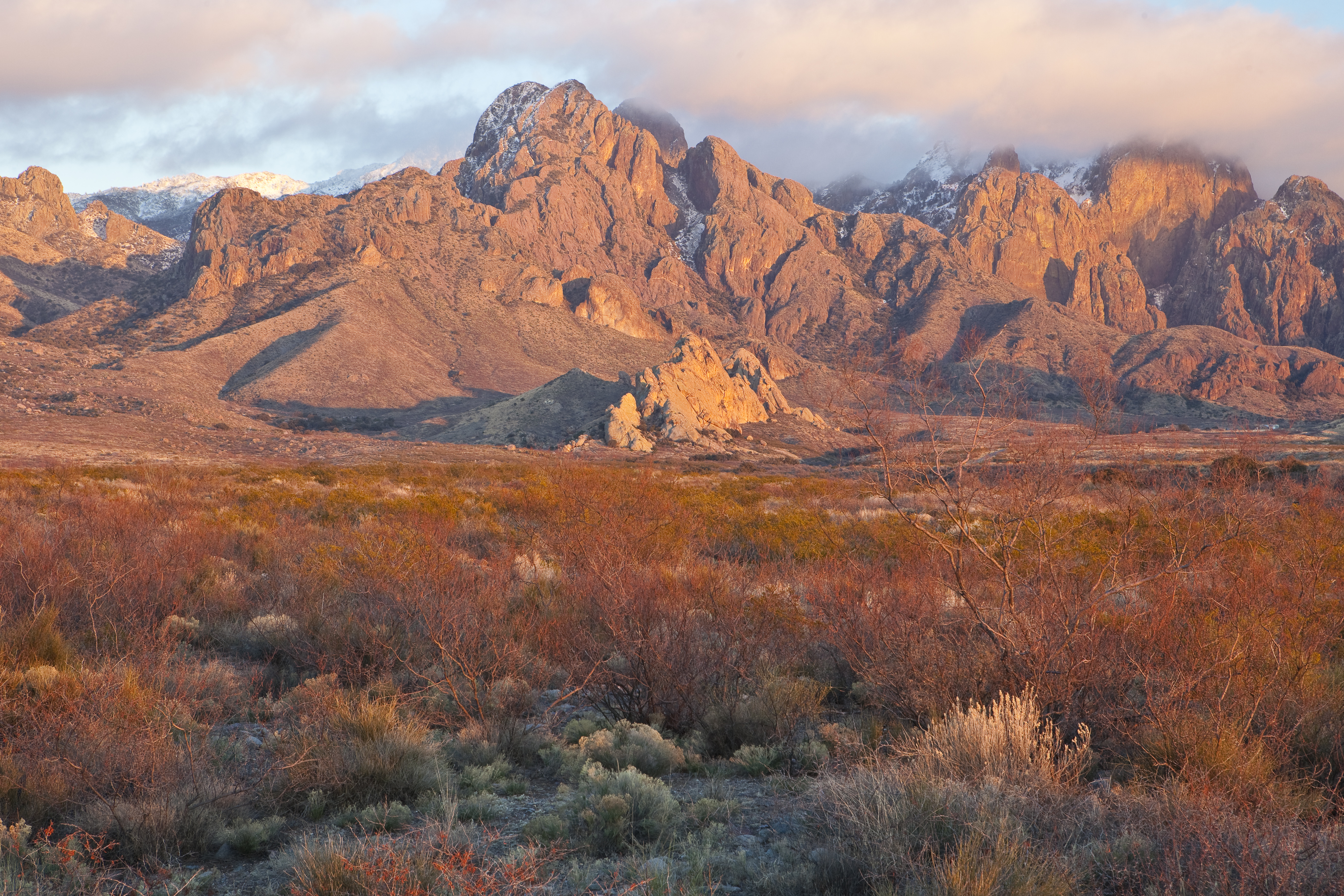
Winter snowfall in the Organ Mountains

The first documented climbs of Organ Mountain peaks were in the early 1890s, but most were done in the mid-1950s by climbers stationed at nearby Fort Bliss Army Base and NMSU faculty. The most prominent of these was R.L Ingraham, whose Guide to Climbing in the Organ Mountains remains a definitive reference.

The Bureau of Land Management maintains hiking trails accessed from four sites in the Organ Mountains:

- Aguirre Springs Campground and Baylor Canyon Road offer access to trails in The Needles from the east and west sides, respectively, and offer access to a trail that leads over Baylor Pass. Trails include the 4.5 mile Pine Tree Trail loop, where visitors can hike from 5,600 feet up to 6,880 feet. This trail covers a wide ecological range, from lower-elevation mountain mahogany scrub to ponderosa pine woodland on its upper parts.
- Dripping Springs Natural Area on the west side of the central rhyolitic portion of the Organ Mountains has a set of interconnected low-elevation trails around La Cueva and entering the lower parts of Fillmore and Ice Canyons.
- The Soledad Canyon Day Use Area provides a loop trail in the lower part of Bar Canyon, south of Dripping Springs on the west side of the range.

The southern limestone section is difficult to access and rarely visited. Bishop's Cap can be reached through rugged dirt roads, but has no developed trails. Rattlesnake Ridge is entirely within Fort Bliss and closed to the general public.

== National monument status ==
President Obama designated the Organ Mountains–Desert Peaks a national monument by executive authority on Wednesday, May 21, 2014. White House press secretary Jay Carney stated that "By establishing the monument, the president will permanently protect more than 496,000 acres to preserve the prehistoric, historic and scientific values of the area for the benefit of all Americans."

== See also ==
- Rio Grande Trail
- Prehistoric Trackways National Monument
