= Haven (given name) =

- Gender: Unisex

Origin
- Origin: English
- Meaning: Place of safety

Haven is a given name of English origin derived from the vocabulary word describing a place or state of safety.

== Popularity ==
The name has been among the one thousand most popular names used for girls in the United States since 1996 and among the top five hundred names for girls since 2012. It is also in occasional use for boys in the United States.

== Men ==
- Haven J. Barlow (1922–2022), American politician
- Hi Brigham (1892–1987), American football player
- Haven Bruce (born 1979), American soccer striker
- Haven Doe (1870–1946), American politician
- Haven Emerson (1875–1957), American educator
- Haven Gillespie (1888–1975), American composer and lyricist who wrote the song "Santa Claus Is Coming to Town"
- Haven Kaye (1846–1892), English cricketer
- Haven Monahan, the alleged perpetrator of the sexual assault depicted in the now-retracted Rolling Stone article "A Rape on Campus"
- Haven Moses (born 1946), former American Football League and National Football League player
- Haven Shoemaker (born 1965), American politician

== Women ==
- Haven Coleman (born 2006), American activist
- Haven Denney (born 1995), American pair skater and 2012 US junior pair champion
- Haven Hailu Desse (born 1998), Ethiopian runner
- Haven Kimmel (born 1965), American author, novelist and poet
- Haven Madison, American singer
- Haven Shepherd (born 2003), American Paralympic swimmer
