= Blue Note: Uncompromising Expression =

Box set by various artists
- Released: November 4, 2014
- Recorded: 1939–2014
- Genres: Jazz; boogie-woogie; swing; bebop; hard bop; soul jazz; bossa nova; jazz-funk; mainstream jazz
- Length: 6:14:39
- Labels: Blue Note Records (Universal Music Enterprises)

Professional ratings
Review scores
Source	Rating
AllMusic	3/5 stars
The Guardian	3/5 stars
Jazzwise	3/5 stars
Financial Times	4/5 stars

Blue Note: Uncompromising Expression is a five-CD box set released on November 4, 2014, that commemorates the 75th anniversary of jazz label Blue Note Records. It consists of 75 singles released by the label between 1939 and 2014. The set was released in a box with a lift-off lid, with the five discs contained in sleeves, and a 52-page book written by music historian Richard Havers (a lengthier book was released separately as a companion piece to the box set on the same day). The set showcases various jazz styles from the label's discography, with a particular focus on hard bop and soul jazz from the 1950s and 1960s.

== Track listing ==
Each disc represents a distinct era in Blue Note's evolution:

=== Disc one (1939–1953): From Boogie to Bop ===
Early boogie-woogie piano recordings segue into pioneering bebop sessions.

1. "Melancholy" by Meade "Lux" Lewis (Lewis) – 4:07
2. "Reminiscing at Blue Note" by Earl "Fatha" Hines (Hines) – 4:28
3. "Summertime" by the Sidney Bechet Quintet (DuBose Howard, George Gershwin, Ira Gershwin) – 4:10
4. "Profoundly Blue" by the Edmond Hall Celeste Quartet (Lewis) – 4:08
5. "Doctor Jazz" by Art Hodes and His Chicagoans (King Oliver) – 3:09
6. "Topsy" by the Ike Quebec Swing Seven (Eddie Durham, Edgar Battle) – 3:03
7. "Tiny's Boogie-Woogie" by the Tiny Grimes Swingtet (Grimes) – 2:59
8. "Oop-Pop-A-Da" by Babs's 3 Bips and a Bop (Gonzales) – 2:53
9. "Thelonious" by Thelonious Monk (Monk) – 3:00
10. "The Thin Man" by Art Blakey and the Jazz Messengers (Kenny Dorham) – 3:00
11. "Moody's All Frantic" by James Moody and His Bop Men (Moody) – 2:35
12. "Double Talk" by the Howard McGhee–Fats Navarro Boptet (McGhee, Navarro) – 5:35
13. "Bouncing with Bud" by Bud Powell's Modernists (Powell, Walter Fuller) – 3:04
14. "Born to Be Blue" by the Wynton Kelly Trio (Mel Tormé, Robert Wells) – 3:28
15. "Straight, No Chaser" by the Thelonious Monk Quintet (Monk) – 2:58
16. "Bags' Groove" by the Milt Jackson Quintet (Milt Jackson) – 3:05
17. "Yesterdays" by the Miles Davis All-Stars (Jerome Kern) – 3:45
18. "Roccus" by the Lou Donaldson Quartet (Horace Silver)– 3:24
19. "Safari" by the Horace Silver Trio (Silver) – 2:51
20. "Tempus Fugit" by the Miles Davis All-Stars (Powell) – 3:52
21. "Carvin' the Rock" by the Clifford Brown Quartet (Elmo Hope, Sonny Rollins) – 3:56

=== Disc two (1953–1958): Messengers, Preachers and Hard Bop ===
Focuses on the emergence of hard bop—a jazz style blending blues, gospel, and R&B influences.

1. "Message from Kenya" by Art Blakey and Sabu Martinez (Blakey) – 4:35
2. "The Preacher" by Horace Silver and the Jazz Messengers (Silver) – 4:18
3. "The High and the Mighty" by Jimmy Smith (Dimitri Tiomkin, Ned Washington) – 4:21
4. "Brownie Speaks" by the Clifford Brown Quintet (Brown) – 3:49
5. "Jay" by J.J. Johnson (Johnson) – 3:41
6. "Wee Dot" by the Art Blakey Quintet (Johnson, Leo Parker) – 6:52
7. "Decision" by Sonny Rollins (Rollins) – 8:02
8. "D.B. Blues" by Kenny Burrell (Lester Young) – 5:49
9. "Funk in Deep Freeze" by the Hank Mobley Quintet (Mobley) – 6:48
10. "Oscalypso" by Curtis Fuller (Oscar Pettiford) – 5:41
11. "Blue Train, Pt. 1" by John Coltrane (Coltrane) – 5:17
12. "Abdallah's Deight" by the Art Blakey Percussion Ensemble (Blakey) – 9:48
13. "Señor Blues" by Bill Henderson and the Horace Silver Quintet (Silver) – 6:13

=== Disc three (1958–1960): Struttin', Moanin' and Somethin' Else ===
Showcases quintessential hard bop recordings alongside early soul jazz experiments.

1. "Cool Struttin'" by Sonny Clark (Clark) – 9:25
2. "Tenderly" by The 3 Sounds (Jack Lawrence, Walter Gross) – 4:36
3. "Ain't No Use" by Bill Henderson and Jimmy Smith (L. Kirkland, Sid Wyche) – 2:44
4. "Ain't No Use" by the Sonny Clark Trio (L. Kirkland, Wyche) – 4:48
5. "Encore" by the Bennie Green Quintet (Gonzales) – 4:17
6. "Moanin', Pts. 1 and 2" by Art Blakey and the Jazz Messengers (Bobby Timmons) – 9:35
7. "Somethin' Else, Pts. 1 and 2" by Cannonball Adderley and Miles Davis (Davis) – 8:15
8. "The Rake" by Dizzy Reece (Reece) – 6:04
9. "What's New" by Jackie McLean (Bob Haggart, Johnny Burke) – 5:18
10. "One Mint Julep" by Freddie Hubbard (Rudy Toombs) – 6:03
11. "Little Cheri" by Stanley Turrentine (Turrentine) – 5:41
12. "True Blue" by Tina Brooks (Brooks) – 4:54

=== Disc four (1960–1965): Bossa, Blues and Hits ===
Highlights include bossa nova fusions, blues-based tracks, and crossover hits.

1. "Miss Ann's Tempo" by Grant Green (Green) – 5:40
2. "Midnight Special" by Jimmy Smith (Smith) – 9:56
3. "One O'Clock Jump" by Jimmy Smith (Count Basie) – 7:01
4. "Ernie's Tune" by Dexter Gordon (Gordon, Vicki Arnold) – 4:16
5. "Watermelon Man" by Herbie Hancock (Hancock) – 7:10
6. "Back at the Chicken Shack, Pts. 1 and 2" by Jimmy Smith (Smith) – 8:05
7. "The Good Life" by Kenny Burrell (Jack Reardon, Alexandra Distel) – 2:36
8. "Our Miss Brooks" by Harold Vick (Vick) – 2:46
9. "Blue Bossa" by Joe Henderson (Dorham) – 8:00
10. "Elijah" by Donald Byrd (Byrd) – 9:19
11. "Blue Frenzy" by Freddie Hubbard (Hubbard) – 3:17
12. "The Sidewinder, Pt. 1" by Lee Morgan (Morgan) – 3:07
13. "Cape Verdean Blues" by the Horace Silver Quintet (Silver) – 4:58

=== Disc five (1969–2014): Can You Dig It? ===
Covers later developments including fusion, acid jazz revivalism, neo-soul inflections, and contemporary vocalists.

1. "Theme from Electric Surfboard" by "Brother" Jack McDuff (McDuff) – 3:33
2. "Black Byrd" by Donald Byrd (Larry Mizell) – 7:18
3. "Chicago, Damn" by Bobbi Humphrey (Chuck Davis) – 6:35
4. "Change (Makes You Want to Hustle)" by Donald Byrd (Mizell) – 5:08
5. "Always There" by Ronnie Laws and Pressure (Paul B. Allen III, Laws, William Fulton Jeffries) – 4:47
6. "It's Better than Walking Out" by Marlena Shaw (Leo Garrett, R. Taylor) – 4:21
7. "Thinkin' About Your Body" by Bobby McFerrin (McFerrin) – 3:16
8. "Cantaloop (Flip Fantasia)" by Us3 (Hancock, Geoffrey Wilkinson, Melvyn Simpson, Rashaan Kelly) – 4:41
9. "Better Days" by Dianne Reeves (Reeves, T. Lorrich) – 5:28
10. "I Can't Stand the Rain" by Cassandra Wilson (Ann Peebles, Bernard Miller, Don Bryant) – 5:33
11. "Don't Know Why" by Norah Jones (Jesse Harris) – 3:05
12. "Smells Like Teen Spirit" by Robert Glasper (Kurt Cobain, Krist Novoselic, Dave Grohl) – 7:22
13. "It's All Over Your Body" by José James (James, Finn Greenall, Grant Windsor, Pino Palladino, Richard Spaven) – 5:30
14. "Modern Blue" by Rosanne Cash (Cash, John Leventhal) – 3:02
15. "Liquid Spirit" by Gregory Porter (Porter) – 3:37
16. "Holding Onto You" by Derek Hodge and the American String Quartet (Hodge) – 4:49

== Companion book ==
The companion book of the same name, by Richard Havers, was released by Thames & Hudson, on November 4, 2014.
