= Havers =

Havers is a surname. Notable people with the surname include:

- Alice Havers (1850–1890), English painter and illustrator
- Arthur Havers (1898–1980), English golfer
- Barbara Havers, a fictional detective in The Inspector Lynley Mysteries TV series
- Cecil Havers (1889–1977), English barrister and judge
- Clopton Havers (1657–1702), English physician
  - Haversian canals, sometimes canals of Havers, microscopic tubes in bone
- Fred and Ernest Havers, automobile manufacturers
  - Havers (automobile)
- Michael Havers, Baron Havers (1923–1992), British barrister and politician
- Nigel Havers (born 1951), English actor, son of Baron Havers
- Richard Havers (1951–2017), British music writer
- Rob Havers (born 1967), British military historian

== See also ==
- Havens (disambiguation)
- Haver, a surname
- Haversine formula
