= Haven Inc. =

Logistics company

- Type: Private
- Industry: Logistics
- Founded: 2014
- Founders: Matt Tillman; Jeff Wehner; Renée DiResta
- Headquarters: San Francisco; Singapore; Basel
- Area served: Worldwide
- Key people: Matt Tillman (CEO); Jeff Wehner (COO)
- Products: Dynamic Ocean
- Website: haveninc.com

Haven Inc. is a company that automates logistics for ocean freight companies. Based in Singapore, San Francisco and Basel, it manages a freight rate and logistics for large international supply chains. Haven is considered one of the pioneers of the digital revolution in shipping logistics.

== History ==
Matt Tillman and Jeff Wehner co-founded Haven in 2014.

== Acquisition ==
FourKites®, a supply chain visibility platform, announced in April 2021 its acquisition of Haven, Inc., and introduction of Dynamic Ocean, a visibility solution for managing international ocean shipments.
