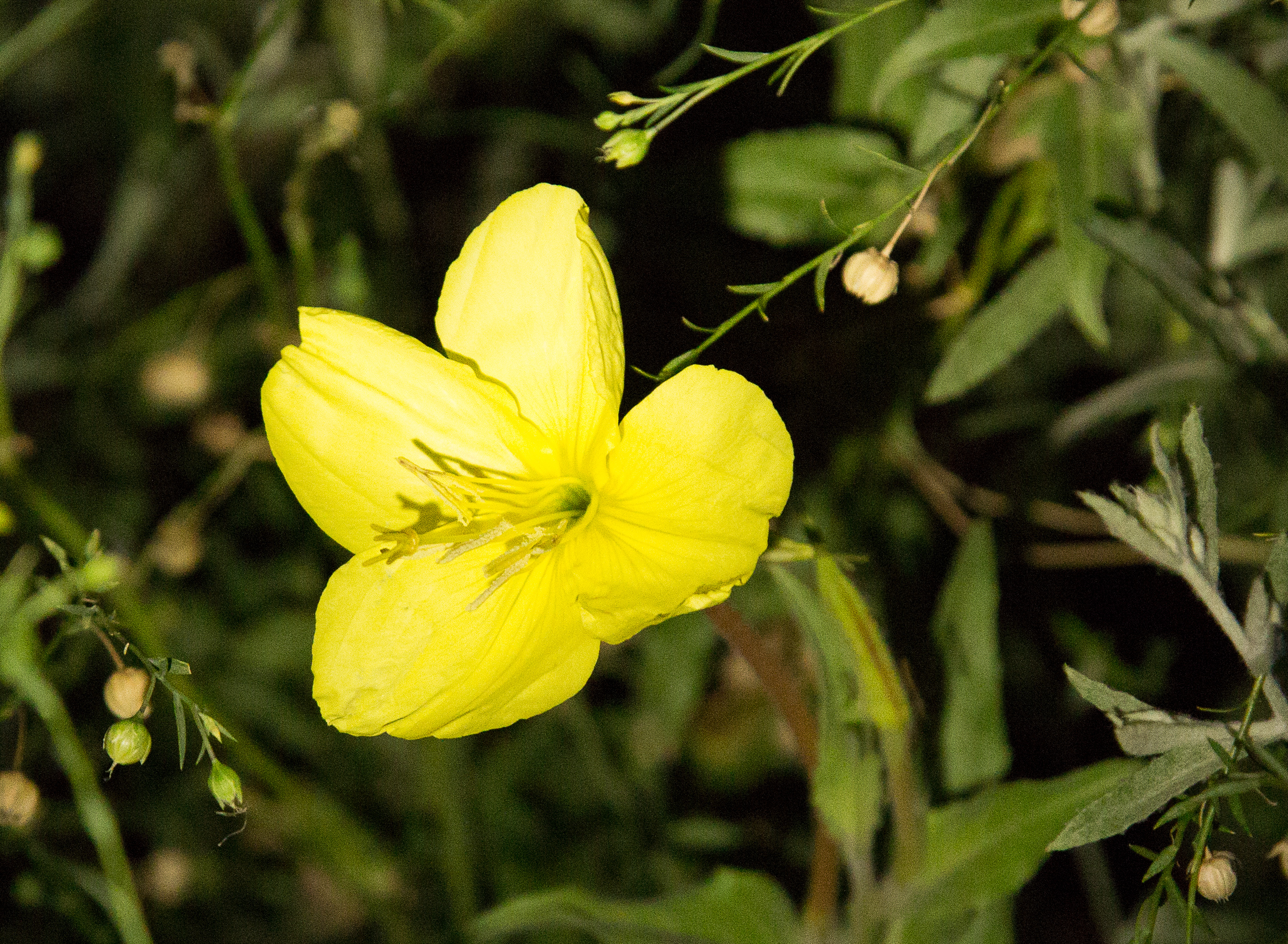
- Flower
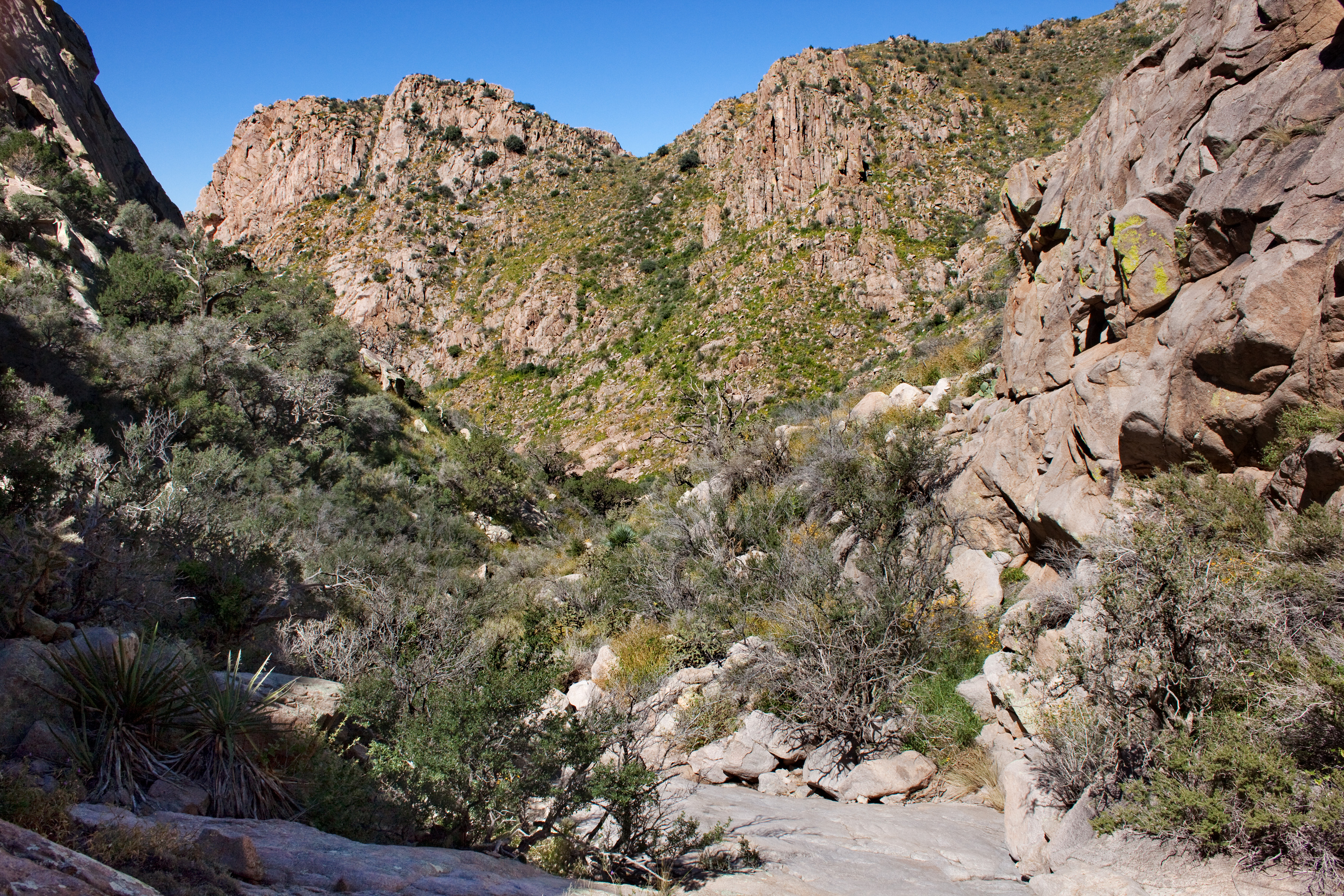
- Habitat

Scientific classification
- Kingdom: Plantae
- Clade: Embryophytes
- Clade: Tracheophytes
- Clade: Angiosperms
- Clade: Eudicots
- Clade: Rosids
- Order: Myrtales
- Family: Onagraceae
- Genus: Oenothera
- Species: O. organensis

Binomial name
- Oenothera organensis Munz ex S.Emers.

Synonyms
- Oenothera macrosiphon Lehm.; Oenothera macrosiphon Wooton & Standl.

= Oenothera organensis =

Species of flowering plant

Oenothera organensis, the Organ Mountains evening-primrose, is a species of flowering plant in the family Onagraceae, native to a few valleys in the Organ Mountains of New Mexico. With only a few thousand individuals, it is nevertheless well-studied due to its complete self-incompatibility, which would seem to be maladaptive in such a rare species.
