= Haven Kaye =

English cricketer

Haven Kaye (11 June 1846 – 24 January 1892) was an English first-class cricketer, who played eight matches for Yorkshire County Cricket Club in 1872 and 1873. A right-handed batsman, he scored 117 runs at 8.35, with a highest score of 33, made against Surrey. He also took three catches, but was not called upon to bowl his right arm, round arm, fast medium.

Born in Huddersfield, Yorkshire, England, Kaye also played for Halifax C.C. in 1880 against 'The Gentlemen of Canada', scoring 35 and 12 at the top of the order in a drawn two-day game.

Kaye died in January 1892 in Halifax, Yorkshire, aged 45.
