= Richard Havers =

British music writer and broadcaster (1951–2017)

- Born: Richard John Havers; 1 April 1951; Carshalton, Surrey, England
- Died: 31 December 2017 (aged 66); Minehead, Somerset, England
- Occupations: Music writer; author; consultant; airline industry manager
- Years active: c. 1970–2017

Richard John Havers (1 April 1951 – 31 December 2017) was a British music author, journalist, consultant and broadcaster.

== Life and career ==
Born in Carshalton, Surrey, Havers attended Reigate Grammar School and then worked for British United Airways, later British Caledonian, at Gatwick Airport. Initially he was a messenger but rose to become product manager on the company's North Atlantic routes, and then had responsibility for developing their domestic routes. In 1984, he moved to Continental Airlines, launching their service between Gatwick and Houston, Texas, and contributing to building up the company's organisation. He left the airline industry in 1989 in order to work in the music industry. His first role, drawing on his airline experience, was in promoting concerts and tours by Paul McCartney, Chicago, and The Beach Boys. He wrote and produced in-flight radio shows, and launched a commercial radio station in Turkey, before becoming a prolific writer of books and articles, mainly on jazz, blues, and pop music.

With Bill Wyman, he wrote Bill Wyman's Blues Odyssey, which won the Blues Foundation Award for Literature in 2002, and Havers also co-directed the television series based on the book. He co-authored Rolling with the Stones (2003), and wrote The Stones – a History in Cartoons (2006), The Stones in the Park (2009, about the band's 1969 Hyde Park concert), and Rolling Stones 50 (2012). He wrote histories of the Blue Note and Verve record labels, and a 2004 biography of Frank Sinatra, and also wrote ghostwritten autobiographies by Tony Visconti, Gary Barlow, and Len Goodman. Other works by Havers include a biography of Marilyn Monroe, books on the Woodstock festival and the Beatles, as well as books unrelated to music, on football, airlines, and 20th-century British culture. He additionally wrote for newspapers and magazines including The Daily Telegraph, The Times, and Record Collector, and contributed liner notes for many blues and jazz box-set anthologies. He was a jazz consultant at the Universal Music Group, and also appeared in radio and television broadcasts.

He lived in the Scottish Borders, where he campaigned against wind farm development in the Lammermuir Hills, before moving to Somerset, where he chaired the board of the tourism organisation Visit Exmoor. He was married twice and had two daughters.

Havers died in Minehead on New Year's Eve, 2017, from cancer.
