= The Haven, West Sussex =

Hamlet in West Sussex, England

Coordinates: 51.064°N 0.447°W

The Haven
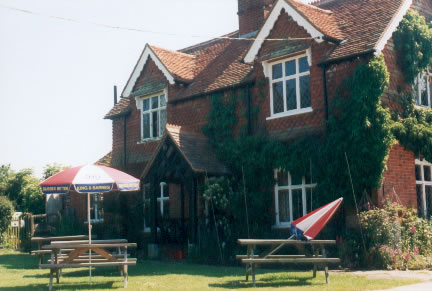
- The Blue Ship

- Location within West Sussex
- Civil parish: Rudgwick
- District: Horsham
- Shire county: West Sussex
- Region: South East
- Country: England
- Sovereign state: United Kingdom
- Police: Sussex
- Fire: West Sussex
- Ambulance: South East Coast
- UK Parliament: Horsham

The Haven is a rural hamlet in West Sussex, south east England located about 7 miles to the west of Horsham.

The Haven is primarily an agricultural area with 75 dwellings scattered across it.

One of its best known landmarks is the pub, The Blue Ship. The pub itself has a main bar that dates back to the fifteenth century although the exterior of the pub is Victorian. Hall and Woodhouse beer is served from two hatches straight from the barrel.
