= The Haven (book) =

2002 memoir by Richard Dubé

The Haven: A True Story of Life in the Hole
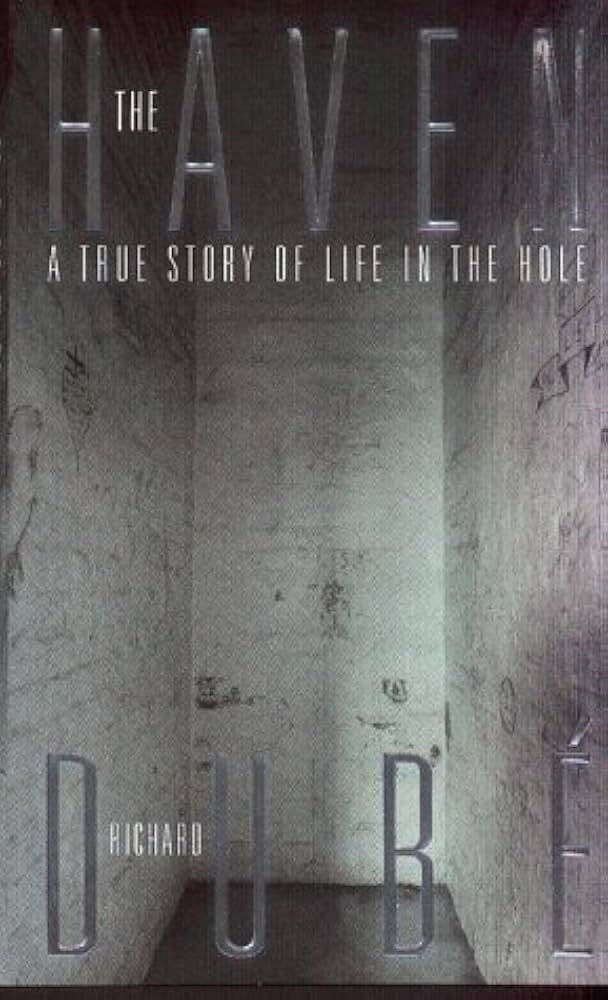
- First edition cover
- Author: Richard Dubé
- Genre: Memoir
- Publisher: HarperCollins
- Publication date: 2002
- Publication place: Canada
- Media type: Print (paperback)
- Pages: 274
- ISBN: 978-0006391623

The Haven: A True Story of Life in the Hole is a 2002 memoir by Canadian author Richard Dubé. The book recounts Dubé's experiences in solitary confinement at Millhaven Penitentiary, a maximum-security prison in Ontario. It explores the physical and psychological effects of prolonged isolation and incarceration.

== Background ==
Richard Dubé grew up in Sudbury, Ontario, raised by his mother and her boyfriend (both abusive alcoholics) alongside his four siblings. In his early twenties, Dubé was convicted of manslaughter. He was sentenced to five years at the medium-security Collins Bay Penitentiary, but was transferred to the maximum-security Millhaven Penitentiary after his violence in jail. A substantial part of his sentence was served in solitary confinement. Eventually, he was released on mandatory parole. He founded a job agency for ex-convicts and a non-profit that aims to prevent youth substance abuse and crime. His memoir was published by HarperCollins in 2002.

== Style ==
The book is related in three narrative "voices": the main events of his imprisonment, boldfaced flashbacks to his time before prison (not in chronological order), and italicized fantasies often focused on violent revenge.

The dominant feature of the book's writing is its intensity of violence. The Globe and Mail described the memoir as "direct, relentless and unforgiving." Pat Donnelly of the Montreal Gazette described it as "raw and chilling", and the Edmonton Journal called it "grim and ultra-violent".

At the sentence level, Donnelly calls the book "a hate-filled rant, written in blunt, staccato prose". The Edmonton Journal described the writing as "frequently overwrought", saying that Dubé's efforts to improve his vocabulary in prison have resulted in "almost comically overripe prose". Similarly, the Saskatchewan Leader-Post comments that Dubé "doesn't seem to realize that wisdom and education are not demonstrated solely through vocabulary". Donnelly concluded that the reading level would be suitable for high schools, since "Dubé isn't big on complex sentences".

== Reception ==
The Haven was released to mixed reviews, receiving media attention in Canada partially due to its subject matter. It was compared to other published Canadian works by criminals including the 1978 Roger "Mad Dog" Caron novel Go-Boy! and the 1986 Stephen Reid novel Jackrabbit Parole; the latter had also been incarcerated in Millhaven Penitentiary.

A review in the Saskatchewan Leader-Post criticized the narrative's lack of focus, considering the memoir incomplete and lacking a coherent message about substance abuse, crime, or incarceration. It opined that "readers will feel little or no sympathy for the man because he only tells part of his story". They note that the story lacks a redemption arc, requiring "more self-examination on the part of the author" to achieve its stated socially beneficial aims. According to a review in the Edmonton Journal, Dubé emerges from prison "unrepentant", blaming the failures of society and the people around him for his crime and violent fantasies. The Montreal Gazette sardonically notes that "Dubé has a rationalization for every occasion".

The Globe and Mail praised the content of the book, writing that "substance soon overtakes the frailties of form". It also complimented its view of a final "portrait of pure rage, a horrifying testament to what prison can breed". It concludes that "Critics of The Haven: A True Story of Life in the Hole will say that the book is facile, one-sided, and that Dubé is a master at evading responsibility for his own fate. But they will have missed the point: Ultimately, this work is not intended to be a balanced evaluation of the prison system, but a view from the inside that confirms our very worst fears about the people we're jailing". The Montreal Gazette wrote that the subject is gripping, illustrative of the risks of institutional violence, and should be made required reading in Canadian high schools.
