= De Haven =

De Haven may refer to:

- De Haven, Virginia
- De Haven Glacier, Wilkes Land, Antarctica
- USS De Haven (DD-469), a Fletcher-class destroyer
- USS De Haven (DD-727), a destroyer

== See also ==
- DeHaven (surname)
