= MT Haven =

Crude oil carrier that sank off the coast of Genoa, Italy in 1991

History
- Name: Amoco Milford Haven; MT Haven
- Owner: Amoco
- Operator: Troodos Shipping
- Port of registry: Cyprus
- Builder: Astilleros Españoles; Cádiz, Spain
- Launched: 20 January 1973
- Out of service: 11 April 1991
- Identification: IMO number: 7304302
- Fate: Sunk at 44.22°N 8.46°E

General characteristics
- Tonnage: 233,690 DWT; 109,700 GRT
- Length: 334.02 m (1,095.9 ft)
- Beam: 51.06 m (167.5 ft)
- Draught: 19.80 m (65.0 ft)
- Installed power: 30,400 hp (22,700 kW), single screw
- Propulsion: Diesel, single screw
- Speed: 15 knots (28 km/h)
- Complement: 44

MT Haven, formerly Amoco Milford Haven, was a VLCC (very large crude carrier), leased to Troodos Shipping (a company run by Loucas Haji-Ioannou and his son Stelios Haji-Ioannou). In 1991, while loaded with 144,000 tonnes (1 million barrels) of crude oil, the ship exploded, caught fire and sank off the coast of Genoa, Italy, killing six Cypriot crew and flooding the Mediterranean with up to 50,000 tonnes of crude oil. It broke in two and sank after burning for three days.

== History ==
Amoco Milford Haven was built by Astilleros Españoles S.A. in Cádiz, Spain, the sister ship of Amoco Cadiz, which sank in 1978. Launched in 1973, she worked various routes shipping crude oil from the Persian Gulf. In 1988 she was hit by a missile in the Gulf during the Iran–Iraq War. Extensively refitted in Singapore, she was sold to ship brokers who leased her to Troodos Shipping, for whom she ran from Iran's Kharg Island to the Mediterranean.

== Accident ==
On 11 April 1991, Haven was unloading a cargo of 230,000 tonnes of crude oil to the Multedo floating platform, 11 kilometres (6.8 mi) off the coast of Genoa, Italy. Having transferred 80,000 tonnes, the ship disconnected from the platform for a routine internal transfer operation, to allow oil to be pumped from two side-holds into a central one.

In later testimony, First Officer Donatos Lilis said: "I heard a very loud noise, like iron bars beating against each other. Perhaps the cover of a pump had broken. Then there was an awful explosion." Five crewmen died immediately, as fire broke out and oil started leaking from the hull as the plates overheated. As the fire engulfed the ship, flames rose 100 m high and, after a series of further explosions occurred, between 30 and 40,000 tonnes of oil poured into the sea.

The Italian authorities acted quickly, with hundreds of men fighting a fire which was difficult to access, and distributing more than 10 kilometres (6.2 mi) of inflatable barriers, submerged a metre below the surface, around the vessel to control the spillage. On day two, MT Haven was to be towed close to the coast, in a bid to reduce the coastal area affected and make intervention easier. As the bow slipped beneath the surface, a steel cable was passed around the rudder and tugs applied towing pressure. But it was quickly clear that the ship had broken its back, and the bow section came to rest in 450 m (1,480 ft) of water. On 14 April, the 250 m long main body sank 2 kilometres (1.2 mi) from the coast, between Arenzano and Cogoleto.

== Environmental disaster ==
Approximately 30,000 to 50,000 tonnes of oil spilled into the sea, more than at the Exxon Valdez disaster two years earlier. An amount of the oil was burned at the surface and more was pumped out of the burning ship wreck. The resulting oil slicks polluted over 100 kilometres of the Italian and French coasts, particularly in the Liguria region and on the Côte d'Azur.

The spilled oil contaminated seagrass meadows (Posidonia oceanica), which serve as important nurseries for fish and provide protection against coastal erosion. Numerous seabirds, fish, and invertebrates died immediately or suffered from the toxic substances. A significant portion of the oil sank to the seabed in the form of "oil patches" due to the heat of the fire and its mixing with sediment. At depths of up to 500 metres, tar clumps formed, which continued to release pollutants into the water for years afterward.

== Shipwreck ==
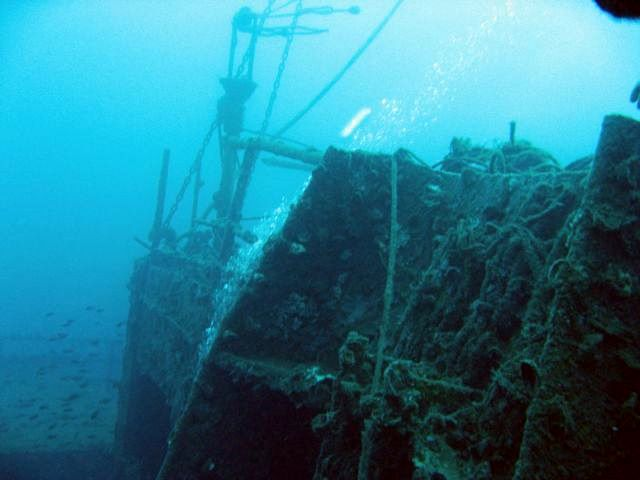
Wreck of MT Haven

After the wreck was declared safe, a mini sub diver found that the stern section had grazed a rocky spur, though not hard enough to open any new holes in the hull, and come to rest at an angle on the flat, sandy seabed. He reported that most of the remaining 80,000 tonnes of crude had burnt or was at the surface. Most of the oil on the surface could be sucked up, and what remained below was in a solid state. For the next 12 years the Mediterranean coast of Italy and France was polluted, especially around Genoa and southern France.

Haven is the largest shipwreck in the region and lies at a depth of 33 metres (108.3 ft) to 83 metres (272.3 ft) off the coast of Genoa. It is a popular tourist attraction with recreational scuba divers.

== Court case ==
=== Background and allegations ===
At the centre of the case was the allegation that Lucas and Stelios had kept their vessel, the Troodos-owned Cyprus-flagged Haven, in such disrepair that she exploded. According to news items it is also alleged that the tanker was due to be scrapped after being hit by an Exocet missile during the Iran–Iraq War and should not have been put back into operation.

=== Outcome ===
Lucas and Stelios were later acquitted after three retrials (of which 2002 was the last) and much controversy, with subsequent appeals and demands for compensation also thrown out. Stelios was quoted after the trial: "My main comment is to ask why it took so long to clear innocent people of these terrible charges."

== Reception ==
Italy's Environment Ministry under-secretary said he was "greatly embittered" by the verdict, saying, "The victims, the relatives and the marine environment that were all seriously damaged are left without convincing answers." The Italian president of the World Wildlife Fund, Grazia Francescato, said in a statement that she was disgusted with Stelios' conduct. She drew similarities with the Moby Prince disaster, an unrelated collision in which 140 people died on a ferry just off the nearby city of Livorno, and the acquittal of four men on charges of manslaughter.

NUMAST, the union that represents merchant officers, described the acquittal as "depressing", a sentiment also expressed by the International Transport Workers' Federation. Only by making ship owners accountable for the state of vessels under their control would substandard ships be eliminated, Andrew Linington, head of communications at NUMAST said. "Even when ship owners were clearly linked with a ship that did not meet acceptable standards it seems no action will be taken," Linington said.

== See also ==
- List of oil spills
- SS London Valour, a bulk carrier wrecked at the mouth of the Port of Genoa in 1970
