= Haven: City of Violence =

Haven: City of Violence Role-Playing Game
- Haven: City of Violence
- Designers: Louis Porter Jr.
- Publishers: Louis Porter Jr. Design
- Genres: Neo-noir, Action Adventure
- Systems: Open Gaming License / d20 System

Haven: City of Violence is a role-playing game created by Louis Porter Jr. Design. The game is a neo-noir "role playing game of hyperkinetic action" and was released for sale in 2003. Haven: City of Violence is the first role-playing game ever to be optioned by a movie production company prior to its public release. Louis Porter Jr. and his company began working on the game in 1998. They had been developing it for six years when Barry Levine's company, Brigade Entertainment, optioned the movie rights for the game.

== Reviews ==
- Backstab #45
- Pyramid
