= Moby Prince disaster =

1991 maritime disaster

Coordinates: 43°29′N 10°16′E

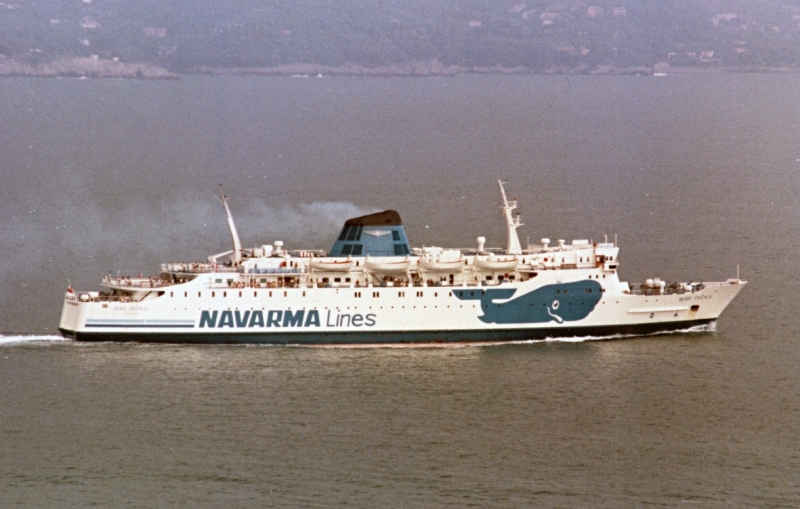
- Moby Prince in July 1986

History
- Name: 1968-1985: Koningin Juliana; 1986-1991: Moby Prince
- Operator: 1968-1985: SMZ; 1986-1991: Navarma Lines
- Port of registry: 1968-1985: Hook of Holland, Netherlands; 1985-1991: Leghorn, Italy
- Builder: Cammell Laird, Birkenhead
- Yard number: 1331
- Launched: 1967
- Out of service: 1991
- Identification: IMO number: 6808806
- Fate: Destroyed by fire, 1991

General characteristics (as built)
- Type: Car / passenger ferry
- Tonnage: 6,682 GT
- Length: 131.02 m (429 ft 10 in)
- Beam: 20.48 m (67 ft 2 in)
- Draught: 5.10 m (16 ft 9 in)
- Installed power: 4 x MAN Augsburg Diesels
- Propulsion: 2 × Controllable pitch propellers; 1 × Bow thruster
- Speed: 39 km/h (21 kn)
- Capacity: 1200 passengers

The Moby Prince disaster was a major maritime accident resulting in 140 deaths. It occurred in the late evening of Wednesday 10 April 1991, in the harbour of Livorno, Italy. It is the worst disaster in the Italian merchant navy since World War II. It is also considered one of the two worst environmental disasters in Italian history, along with the explosion and loss of the tanker Amoco Milford Haven on the following day in an unrelated accident near Voltri.

MV Moby Prince, a ferry owned by Navigazione Arcipelago Maddalenino (NAVARMA) Lines, collided with the oil tanker Agip Abruzzo, sparking an extensive fire that ravaged the ship. The only survivor of the crew and passengers of the ferry was a young ship's boy, Alessio Bertrand from Naples. The other 140 on board were killed by the fire or toxic fumes.

On 28 May 1998 the ship's hull sank while impounded in a dock in Leghorn Harbour; it was later refloated and sent to be scrapped in Turkey.

== Vessel ==
MV Moby Prince was an Italian ferry owned by Navarma Lines (later Moby Lines). She was built in 1967 by the English shipyard Cammell Laird of Birkenhead as Koningin Juliana for ferry operator Stoomvaart Maatschappij Zeeland of the Netherlands, and was used on the Harwich to Hook of Holland route until 1984.

== Collision ==
At 22:03 on 10 April 1991 the Moby Prince left Livorno, heading to Olbia for a regular service, with 75 passengers, crewed by a complement of 66. The ship was commanded by Ugo Chessa. While taking the usual dedicated route out of the harbor, the ferry's bow struck the Agip Abruzzo, which was standing at anchor, and sliced through its tank number 7. The tank was filled with 2,700 tons of Iranian light crude oil. At 22:25, the ferry's radio operator broadcast a mayday from the portable VHF transmitter. He did not use the fixed radio set, since he was not at his post at the moment of the disaster, as was later confirmed by the location of his body.

== Fire ==
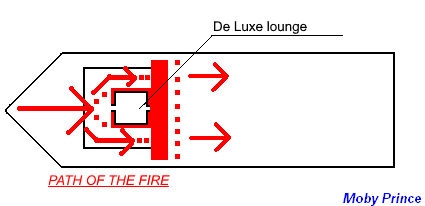
Fire path on the ferry, with the De Luxe lounge in the centre

Some of the oil spread on the surface of the sea and caught fire, but the remainder was sprayed onto the Moby Prince by the impact. A raging fire quickly engulfed the ferry. The exact quantity of oil sprayed on the ferry was estimated in the subsequent trial at 100 to 300 tons. In the collision, the tanker got stuck to the ferry. The tanker commander ordered full power to the engines and managed to separate the ships, but unwittingly worsened the oil spill.

The deck of the Moby Prince was on fire, but the people aboard had some time to reach safety. The fire reached the ship's interior only after the two massive covers between the deck and the upper car compartment gave way under the intense heat. Once that happened, the fire spread to the prow engine room, slowed only by the fireproof doors. According to later surveys, the fire took over half an hour to reach the De Luxe hall, the ship's safe meeting point.

== First response ==
Rescuers were alerted by repeated calls from the Agip Abruzzo, but the Mayday from the Moby Prince went unheard. The situation was unclear until 23:35 – over one hour after the collision – when the ferry's wreck was located. The crew of the Moby Prince had no time to cut power to the engines. The ship was left out of control and began circling away from the location of the collision, still engulfed in flames, as was the sea around her, making rescue even harder.

The crew mustered the passengers in the De Luxe hall in the ship's prow, relying on a quick rescue by the port authorities, whose base was just minutes away. The hall was equipped with fireproof doors and walls. The flames were fueled by the oil sprayed on the prow, but the wave of fire passed over and around the hall, igniting anything around it but leaving the hall and its occupants unscathed. The hall's safety features might have given a chance of rescue, but the rescue operators were slow to respond, because of miscommunication and confusion from the misunderstood disaster dynamics. By the time the crew understood that help was not coming quickly, the hall's surroundings were engulfed in flames and no escape route was available.

Post mortem examination of the victims revealed that many of them died of carbon monoxide poisoning, having survived (albeit unconscious) for hours after the fire broke out. The thick black smoke from the oil and from the plastics of the ferry's fittings was aggravated by gases evaporating from the crude oil.

When the first wave of flames hit the command deck, the crew had to flee without disengaging the ferry's air conditioning system – the fans were still operating when the wreck was visited the following day, and it was found that the air circulation contributed to diffusing toxic gases and smoke in the rooms not directly affected by the fire.

=== Mistakes in rescue operations ===
Rescue operations were slow and chaotic, and it was later proved that problems with the rescue constituted one of the major causes of death. At first, the rescue ships from Leghorn centered their operations around the Agip Abruzzo, reaching the scene at 23:00 p.m. and saving all the crew of the tanker. The mayday from the Moby Prince went unheard, too feeble and garbled for the Port Authority to understand.

Mayday ... Mayday ... Moby Prince ... Moby Prince ... We are in a collision ... We are on fire ... Firemen needed ... Mate, if you do not help us we will burn ... Mayday ... Mayday ...

— (Moby Prince radio operator call)

Commander Renato Superina of Agip Abruzzo communicated by radio with the rescuers at 22:36, declaring that the ship had struck a bettolina (a kind of small service boat used for refueling), misreporting the accident and asking the rescuers to hurry to the tanker, "without mistaking them for us". This error was later repeated by the radio operator of Agip Abruzzo: "looks like it was a bettolina striking us".

The Commander of the Port of Leghorn, Admiral Sergio Albanese, rushed to the scene aboard the Coast Guard vessel CP250. As part of his duties he was in charge of coordinating the rescue activities. However, no orders from Admiral Albanese were reported by any officer involved in the rescue operation and his voice is never heard in the recordings of the VHF channels that night. Admiral Albanese was quickly exonerated during the trial, raising questions about whether he rushed to the site to cover secret military operations by other unidentified ships.

== First aid ==
The first to find the Moby Prince wreck (at 23:35, over an hour after the collision) were two tugboat operators, Mauro Valli and Walter Mattei, who managed to recover the only survivor, Alessio Bertrand, a ship's boy hanging from the stern railing.

Along with Valli and Mattei came Port Authority guard ship CP232. The tugboat operators repeatedly called for help, especially after Bertrand told them that many people were still in danger. Bertrand was put on board the guard ship, which stayed for over half an hour looking for survivors, but then headed back to the port since he needed medical attention. Valli and Mattei later reported that Bertrand said "there is no one to save anymore, they have all been burned to death".

Meanwhile, tugboats and firefighting ships were sent to the wreck and began cooling the hull. At 03:30 sailor Giovanni Veneruso, from a private tugboat, volunteered to board the ferry to attach a towline, the first rescuer to board the ship after the disaster. Other rescuers reached the ship only hours later, in the morning, when the fire on the wreck was extinguished.

== Corpse on the deck ==
A Carabinieri helicopter left its base early in the morning to join the rescue operations and filmed a corpse lying on its back near the ship's stern. The corpse was not charred, even though the surroundings were deeply scorched by the flames. Later, when the wreck was returned to Leghorn harbour, firemen found the body completely burned by the heat, suggesting that many people did not die quickly in the flames, but slowly from the intense heat and suffocation. This opinion was thoroughly discussed in the trial. Some experts asserted that the corpse on the deck was a passenger who, after surviving the fire and suffocation, tried to reach the rescue ship at dawn, but was overcome by heat from the deck's metal.

In September 1992 a videotape recorded by a passenger shortly before the collision was found in good shape, confirming that the flames and heat were quite tolerable where the passengers were sheltered, and a quicker rescue operation could have saved many lives.

== Fate of hull ==
The charred hull was moored at Leghorn until 17 May 1998, when she sank. The rusty wreckage was later raised and towed to Aliağa, Turkey to be scrapped. The sinking of the Moby Prince was the worst disaster for the Italian merchant marine since the end of World War II.

== Causes ==
=== Fog ===
Among the officially accepted causes of the disaster, fog played the leading role. Judges confirmed that a natural phenomenon called advection fog (a quick buildup of thick fog in a small area caused by hot, moist air reaching the cold sea surface) was experienced that evening in the zone around the Agip Abruzzo, preventing the Moby Prince from spotting the tanker. Several qualified witnesses, including officers from the nearby Naval Academy, however, reported that visibility was good and no fog was present. Most of the witnesses referred to the smoke generated after the collision as "fog".

While this is one of the officially recognised causes of the disaster, many doubts were advanced as to whether the phenomenon had really occurred, especially after an amateur video found in the De Luxe hall was shown on TG1. In the video, weather conditions seem fair. Guardia di Finanza captain Cesare Gentile, commanding a guard ship which joined the first rescue efforts at 22:35, testified that "at the time, the weather was excellent, the sea was calm and visibility was perfect".

=== Bombing ===
The judges considered the hypothesis that a bomb aboard the ferry sent it off course, causing it to crash into the tanker. At first this hypothesis was considered likely, but it was quickly dismissed during the trial due to expert and other testimony, especially that of the only survivor.

=== Traffic ===
A rumor that the United States and NATO military headquarters had radar reports and satellite photographs of the disaster received widespread attention, but was later denied by the respective commands.

The presence of the bettolina was never confirmed. The tanker commander in the early calls for help confirmed many times that the ship struck a small tugboat, grossly mistaking the real nature of the event. Those calls were undoubtedly influenced by the confusion from the collision and by low visibility caused by the smoke. Some sailors from Agip Abruzzo testified that they saw the silhouette of a ship in the fire, but only a few of them recognized that it could have been a ferry.

Three elements are thought to confirm the presence of a bettolina:

- Tank number 6 of the Agip Abruzzo was not correctly sealed, as if it were being loaded or unloaded.
- A length of pipe commonly used to refuel small boats was found, partly burned, near the tanker.
- The record marked 11.30 p.m. from the diary of the captain of the Efdim Junior: "We learned that two ships, a passenger ferry and a tanker, had collided and that fire had broken out. I chose to stay at anchor because the great number of boats moving away from the burning ships and the many boats taking part in the search and rescue operations in zero visibility."

Against this theory, there are mostly verbal witnesses, among them the harbour spotter Romero Ricci, pilot Federico Sgherri and many other officers from Agip Abruzzo, and harbour personnel.

Two bigger ships, probably the Cape Breton and Gallant II, both American, were riding at anchor near the Agip Abruzzo, as shown in a photograph taken from the Leghorn seafront the afternoon before the tragedy. Captain Gentile gave an account about the position of the ships in the harbour after the collision:

I saw the silhouette of the Agip Abruzzo just outside the harbour, but not the Moby in flames. [...] I had a tanker to my left, about 700–800 meters from the Naval Academy. Then there was the tanker in that position. On the other side there were four ships, among them one perhaps carrying munitions; at the northern entrance, near the Calambrone, there was an illuminated American ship loading munitions.

— Cesare Gentile, Guardia di Finanza

In 2008, it was found that Theresa, another ship, had been present at the scene but her involvement remains unclear. A mysterious audio recording from 22:45, just after the collision, was discovered in 1991. It said in English: "This is Theresa, this is Theresa for the Ship One in Livorno anchorage I'm moving out, I'm moving out ..." No ship named Theresa was registered in the harbour records, and it is still unknown what is the "Ship One" referred in the recording.

=== Position of Agip Abruzzo ===
The real location of the Agip Abruzzo is debated. The ship's commander declared he was at anchor with the prow pointing south, but later revised his account. The tanker appeared to be heading south in the hours after the collision, as evidenced by a video recording found months after the disaster. It was never clarified if the collision was caused by the ferry going off course or if the tanker was mistakenly positioned in the "exit cone" of the harbor, where parking was strictly forbidden. The first position communicated by the Agip Abbruzzo Commander was recorded in the VHF transmission with the first mayday request. The voice of Commander Superina is clearly audible and reported a position inside the no-anchor-zone. Based on this initial declaration, the collision can be explained with the Agip Abruzzo being anchored wrongfully in the legitimate path of the Moby Prince. This may explain why Commander Superina's statements changed later on during the trial. The Captain's Log which would have confirmed the correct position was surprisingly not immediately acquired and was lost a few days later.

=== Human error ===
Blame was put on the crew of the Moby Prince for not using the radar equipment, for not following proper procedures for harbor maneuvering, and for speeding. The press wrongly reported that the crew was distracted by the UEFA Cup Winners' Cup football semi-final between Juventus and Barcelona. This accusation was decisively refuted when Bertrand was interrogated and declared that the commanding officers were at the helm of the ferry, where they should be.

=== Rudder malfunction ===
Initial speculation about a rudder malfunction, or problems with any other critical navigation system, were dismissed by early surveys by Leghorn's prosecutors.

=== Military ships and weapon traffic ===
It is still unclear whether US or other naval vessels were present in the vicinity of the disaster. At the time of the collision, radio recordings and verbal accounts imply that unregistered ships were probably present, and transfers from cargo ships bearing munitions were Gallant 2 alleged. The presence of U.S. Navy ships – or military ships from other nations – was repeatedly reported, but their real presence, identity and activities are currently unknown. American ships frequently visited the harbor, as Camp Darby is nearby. The presence of undercover military ships was not unusual; neither was the use of fake names when ships were employed in secret military activities. Arms traffic in the Leghorn harbor was allegedly linked to the disaster, as an explanation of the covert ship movements and of bureaucratic hurdles encountered when seeking official documents from the military commands.

== Trials ==
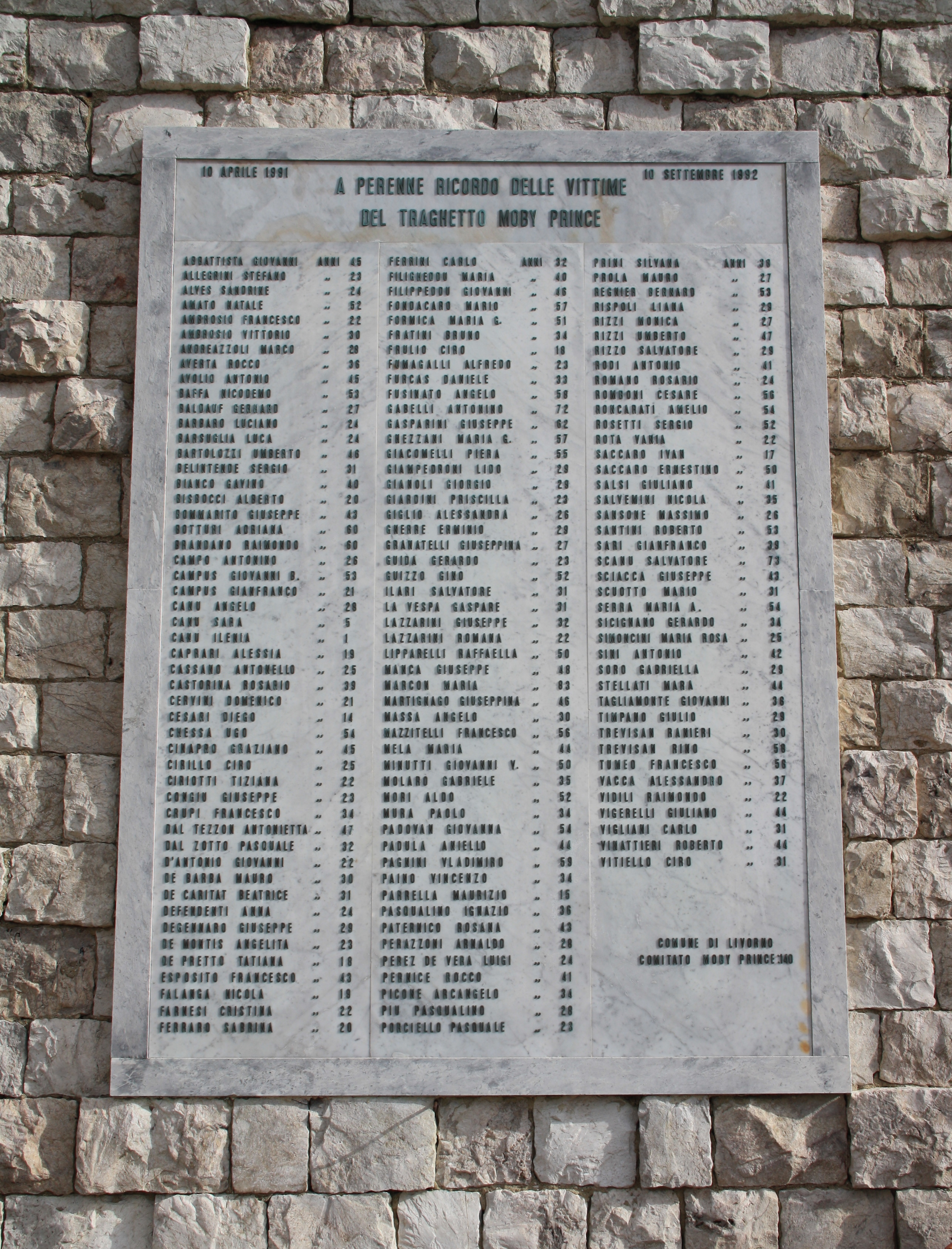
Plaque in memory of the 140 victims

Immediately after the disaster, the Leghorn public prosecutor began proceedings against unknown persons for failure to assist and culpable homicide. The first trial began on 29 November 1995: third officer Valentino Rolla of the Agip Abruzzo, acting commander of the tanker, was charged with multiple culpable homicide and arson; Angelo Cedro, deputy commander of the Port Authority, and guard officer Lorenzo Checcacci were charged with multiple culpable homicides for the lateness of the rescues; sailor Gianluigi Spartano was charged of culpable homicide for missing the ferry's Mayday. Charges against Achille Onorato, the owner of NAVARMA, and Agip Abruzzo commander Renato Superina were dropped.

The trial came to an end two years later, on the night of 31 October 1997, in a very tense atmosphere: in a courtroom full of police and carabinieri, jury president Germano Lamberti read out the verdict absolving all the accused. This verdict, however, was partially revised on appeal. The terza sezione penale (third criminal court) in Florence declared that further proceedings were not to be taken, because of a statute of limitations. In November 1997, 11 members of parliament proposed a new commission of inquiry.

In addition to the main trial, two separate cases were examined in the district court: Moby Prince first mate Ciro Di Lauro confessed to tampering with the rudder in the engine room of the scorched hull in order to set inquirers on the wrong track; and Pasquale D'Orsi, maintenance technician for NAVARMA, was accused by Lauro. They were both absolved of any offence in the trial and two appeals.

In 2006, at the request of Commander Chessa's sons, the Leghorn public prosecutor opened a new inquiry into the disaster. New images of the disaster were found in the offices of the Leghorn public prosecutor, confirming the presence of satellite reconnaissance of the area on the night of the collision. In 2009 the association of victims relatives asked president Giorgio Napolitano to ask Barack Obama to disclose the radar recordings, satellite images and any other information available to American authorities. In April 2009, parliamentarian Ermete Realacci called for a new inquiry into the alleged presence of other ships, especially of the US Navy, in the harbor on the night of the disaster.

On 16 November 2007 Fabio Piselli, a former army paratrooper, told the press of new information about the disaster that he had found while investigating the death of a relative working for the U.S. Embassy in Rome. He met with attorney Carlo Palermo, but was later allegedly attacked by four people who kidnapped him, shut him in the trunk of a car and set it on fire; however, he managed to escape. An inquiry into the incident was opened.

In 2009 Alessio Bertrand was interrogated again, and the seabed of the harbor was searched, yielding new evidence.

The floating hull remained impounded in the Leghorn harbor. In 1998 it almost sank, but was raised and sent for scrap to Aliaga, Turkey.

== Dedications ==
A memorial tablet by Molo Mediceo in Leghorn bears the names and ages of the 140 victims of the incident. The comune of Livorno dedicated a square and many public events to the victims.

In Pizzo a bas-relief carved out of marble, depicting the boat and 4 seagulls is dedicated to the event. The plaque explains the purpose of the memorial is to pique the interest of anyone with the hope that with a single Google search for "Moby Prince", they may learn about the disaster and the people who died in order to keep the memory alive. The plaque also contain a QR Code linking to the Italian Wikipedia article for the Moby Prince.

== List of the victims ==
List of the victims, with names and ages:

- Abbattista Giovanni, 45, ferry crew
- Allegrini Stefano, 23, passenger
- Alves Sandrine, 24, passenger
- Amato Natale, 52, ferry crew
- Ambrosio Francesco, 22, passenger
- Ambrosio Vittorio, 30, passenger
- Andreazzoli Marco, 28, passenger
- Averta Mariano Rocco, 36, ferry crew
- Avolio Antonio, 45, ferry crew
- Baffa Nicodemo, 52, ferry crew
- Baldauf Gerhard, 27, passenger
- Barbaro Luciano, 24, ferry crew
- Barsuglia Luca, 24, passenger
- Bartolozzi Umberto, 48, ferry crew
- Belintende Sergio, 31, passenger
- Bianco Gavino, 40, ferry crew
- Bisbocci Alberto, 20, passenger
- Bommarito Giuseppe, 43, ferry crew
- Botturi Adriana, 60, passenger
- Brandano Raimondo, 60, passenger
- Campo Antonino, 26, ferry crew
- Campus Giovanni Battista, 53, ferry crew
- Campus Gianfranco, 21, passenger
- Canu Angelo, 28, passenger
- Canu Sara, 5, passenger
- Canu Ilenia, 1, passenger
- Caprari Alessia, 19, passenger
- Cassano Antonello, 25, ferry crew
- Castorina Rosario, 39, ferry crew
- Cervini Domenico, 21, ferry crew
- Cesari Diego, 24, passenger
- Chessa Ugo, 54, ferry crew
- Cinapro Graziano, 45, passenger
- Cirillo Ciro, 25, ferry crew
- Ciriotti Tiziana, 22, ferry crew
- Congiu Giuseppe, 23, passenger
- Crupi Francesco, 34, ferry crew
- Dal Tezzon Antonietta, 47, passenger
- Dal Zotto Pasquale, 32, passenger
- D'Antonio Giovanni, 22, ferry crew
- De Barba Mauro, 30, passenger
- De Caritat Beatrice, 31, passenger
- Defendenti Anna, 24, passenger
- De Gennaro Giuseppe, 29, ferry crew
- De Montis Angelita, 23, passenger
- De Pretto Tatiana, 18, ferry crew
- Esposito Francesco, 43, ferry crew
- Falanga Nicola, 19, ferry crew
- Farnesi Cristina, 22, ferry crew
- Ferraro Sabrina, 20, ferry crew
- Ferrini Carlo, 32, passenger
- Filigheddu Maria, 40, passenger
- Filippeddu Giovanni, 46, passenger
- Fondacaro Mario, 57, ferry crew
- Formica Maria Giovanna, 51, passenger
- Fratini Bruno, 34, passenger
- Frulio Ciro, 18, ferry crew
- Fumagalli Andrea Alfredo, ferry crew
- Furcas Daniele, 33, passenger
- Fusinato Angelo, 58, passenger
- Gabelli Antonino, 72, passenger
- Gasparini Giuseppe, 62, passenger
- Ghezzani Maria Giulia, 57, passenger
- Giacomelli Piera, 55, passenger
- Giampedroni Lido, 29, ferry crew
- Gianoli Giorgio, 29, passenger
- Giardini Priscilla, 23, ferry crew
- Giglio Alessandra, 26, passenger
- Gnerre Erminio, 29, passenger
- Granatelli Giuseppina 27, passenger
- Guida Gerardo, 23, ferry crew
- Guizzo Gino, 52, passenger
- Ilari Salvatore, 31, ferry crew
- La Vespa Gaspare, 31, ferry crew
- Lazzarini Giuseppe, 32, passenger
- Lazzarini Romana, 22, passenger
- Lipparelli Raffaella, 50
- Manca Giuseppe, 48, ferry crew
- Marcon Maria, 83, passenger
- Martignago Giuseppina, 46
- Massa Angelo, 30, ferry crew
- Mazzitelli Francesco, 56, ferry crew
- Mela Maria, 44, passenger
- Minutti Giovanni V., 50, passenger
- Molaro Gabriele, 35, passenger
- Mori Aldo, 52, passenger
- Mura Paolo, 34, ferry crew
- Padovan Giovanna, 54, passenger
- Padula Aniello, 44, ferry crew
- Pagnini Vladimiro, 59, passenger
- Paino Vincenzo, 34, ferry crew
- Parrella Maurizio, 15, ferry crew
- Pasqualino Ignazio, 36, ferry crew
- Paternicò Rosanna, 43, passenger
- Perazzoni Arnaldo, 28, passenger
- Perez De Vera Luigi, 24, ferry crew
- Pernice Rocco, 41, ferry crew
- Picone Arcangelo, 34, ferry crew
- Piu Pasqualino, 28, passenger
- Porciello Pasquale, 23, ferry crew
- Prini Silvana, 38, passenger
- Prola Mauro, 27, ferry crew
- Regnier Bernard, 53, passenger
- Rispoli Liana, 29, ferry crew
- Rizzi Monica, 27, passenger
- Rizzi Umberto, 47, passenger
- Rizzo Salvatore, 29, ferry crew
- Rodi Antonio, 41, ferry crew
- Romano Rosario, 24, ferry crew
- Romboni Cesare, 56, passenger
- Roncarati Amelio, 54, passenger
- Rosetti Sergio, 52, ferry crew
- Rota Vania, 22, ferry crew
- Saccaro Ernesto, 50, passenger
- Saccaro Ivan, 17, passenger
- Salsi Giuliano, 41, passenger
- Salvemini Nicola, 35, ferry crew
- Sansone Massimo, 26, passenger
- Santini Roberto, 53, ferry crew
- Sari Gianfranco, 39, passenger
- Scanu Salvatore, 73, passenger
- Sciacca Giuseppe, 53, ferry crew
- Scuotto Mario, 31, ferry crew
- Serra Maria Antonia, 54, passenger
- Sicignano Gerardo, 34, ferry crew
- Simoncini Maria Rosa, 25, passenger
- Sini Antonio, 42, passenger
- Soro Gabriella, 29, passenger
- Stellati Mara, 44, passenger
- Tagliamonte Giovanni, 36, ferry crew
- Timpano Giulio, 29, ferry crew
- Trevisan Ranieri, 30, passenger
- Trevisan Rino, 58, passenger
- Tumeo Francesco, 58, ferry crew
- Vacca Alessandro, 37, passenger
- Vidili Raimondo, 22, passenger
- Vigerelli Giuliano, 44, passenger
- Vigliani Carlo, 31, ferry crew
- Vinattieri Roberto, 44, passenger
- Vitiello Ciro, 31, ferry crew
