= Ralph Havens =

American luger (born 1943)

Personal information
- Nationality: American
- Born: April 10, 1943 (age 83) San Diego, California, United States

Sport
- Sport: Luge

Ralph Havens (born April 10, 1943) is an American luger. He competed in the men's singles event at the 1972 Winter Olympics.
